= Muhammad Umar al-Mukhtar =

Only son of Omar Al-Mukhtar

Muhammad Umar al-Mukhtar (Arabic: محمد عمر المختار) (1921 – 12 July 2018) was the only son of Libyan mujahid Umar al-Mukhtar.

== Life ==
Muhammad Umar al-Mukhtar was born in 1921 in the al-Awailiya region, near Marj in eastern Libya, the son of Umar and his wife Naisa al-Jilani. Muhammad was raised almost exclusively by his mother and some of his maternal relatives from the Al-Manfah tribe, one of the largest tribes in eastern Libya, because his father was fighting at the head of the Libyan resistance. Muhammad received his education at Al-Shatby School in the coastal city of Alexandria. He left Libya with his mother for Egypt in 1927, at the request of his father, who wanted to devote himself to fighting the Italian occupation forces. Muhammad lived in Egypt for 18 years, in the city of Hammam and he moved between the cities of Sidi Barani, Matruh, Alexandria and others.

Muhammad was married twice. The first with his cousin, Azza al-Fayumi in 1942. They had no children and she died in the early 1960s. After the death of his first wife, he remarried in 1964 with Fatima al-Gharyani, with whom he had several children. However, they all died young, leaving Muhammad as the only descendant of Umar al-Mukhtar until his death.

With the 1969 revolution, the new leader Mu'ammar al-Gaddafi tried to appropriate the figure and struggle of Umar al-Mukhtar, claiming himself as a successor to his legacy and even gave his first public speech in front of his sanctuary on September 16. For this very reason, al-Gaddafi attempted to approach Muhammad al-Mukhtar as a way to find legitimacy through the public approval of his son. Al-Gaddafi was seen accompanied by Muhammad in public several times, including at a tribute ceremony for Umar al-Mukhtar in 1984 attended by Hafez al-Assad, Yasser Arafat and Chadli Bendjedid. Muhammad also accompanied the Libyan leader during his historic visit to Rome in June 2009. During the meeting, al-Gaddafi, who was wearing a picture of the capture of Umar al-Mukhtar on his chest, made Italian Prime Minister Silvio Berlusconi apologize to Muhammad for the murder of his father and for the Italian colonization of Libya.

Having been a figure used by the al-Gaddafi government for propaganda purposes for more than 40 years, Muhammad al-Mukhtar publicly broke with the Libyan regime after the 2011 rebellion and issued a statement calling on the Libyan leader to resign. During the Civil War, Muhammad supported the rebels, denounced the government side and asked the Libyans not to fall into tribalism, calling for national unity whoever won.

Muhammad Umar al-Mukhtar died on 12 July 2018 at his home in the al-Hadayek district of Benghazi at the age of 97 according to Anadolu Agency.
