= Italian colonization of Libya =

Italian colonization of Libya (1911–1943)
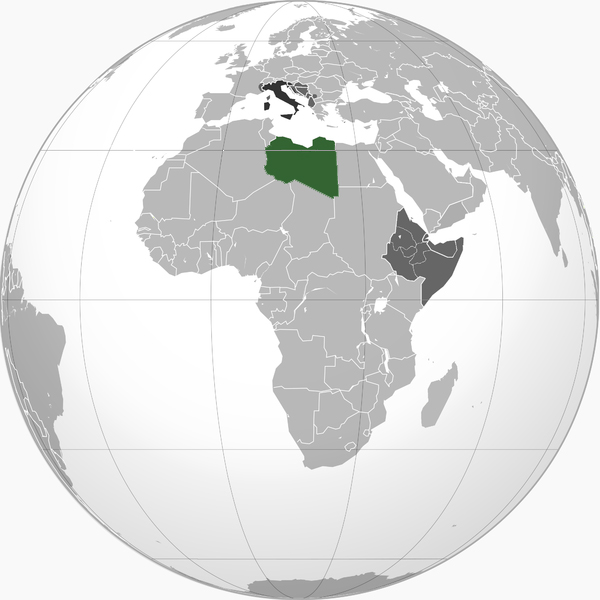
- Italian Libya Other Italian possessions Kingdom of Italy
- Italian Tripolitania and Cyrenaica: 1911–1934
- Italian Libya: 1934–1943

The Italian colonization of Libya began in 1911 and it lasted until 1943. The country, which was previously an Ottoman possession, was occupied by Italy in 1911 after the Italo-Turkish War, which resulted in the establishment of two colonies: Italian Tripolitania and Italian Cyrenaica. In 1934, the two colonies were merged into one colony which was named the colony of Italian Libya. In 1937, this colony was divided into four provinces, and in 1939, the coastal provinces became a part of metropolitan Italy as the Fourth Shore. The colonization lasted until Libya's occupation by Allied forces in 1943, but it was not until the 1947 Paris Peace Treaty that Italy officially renounced all of its claims to Libya's territory.

== Italian Tripolitania and Cyrenaica (1911–1934) ==
=== First years ===
Italy's representation of the takeover of Ottoman Tripolitania in 1911

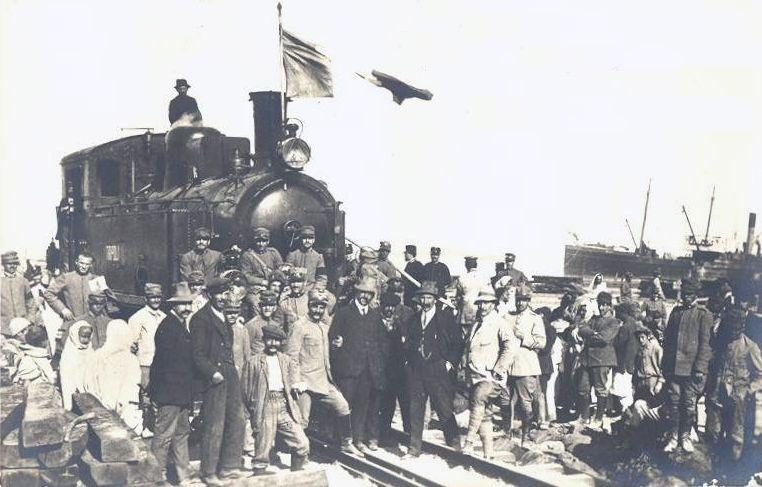
Arrival of the first Italian locomotive in the harbor of Tripoli, 1912

On 3 October 1911, Italy attacked Tripoli, claiming to be liberating the Ottoman wilayats from the Sublime porte's rule.

Despite a major revolt by the Arabs, the Ottoman sultan ceded Libya to the Italians by signing the 1912 Treaty of Lausanne (not to be confused with a more famous treaty of the same name of 1923). The Italians made extensive use of the Savari, colonial cavalry troops raised in December 1912. These units were recruited from the Arab-Berber population of Libya following the initial Italian occupation in 1911–12. The Savari, like the Spahi, or mounted Libyan police, formed part of the Regio Corpo Truppe Coloniali della Libia (Royal Corps of Libyan Colonial Troops). Tripoli was largely under Italian control by 1914, but both Cyrenaica and the Fezzan were home to rebellions led by the nomadic Senussi.

Sheikh Sidi Idris al-Mahdi as-Senussi (later King Idris I), of the Senussi, led Libyan resistance in various forms through the outbreak of the Second World War. After the Italian army invaded Cyrenaica in 1913 as part of their wider invasion of Libya, the Senussi Order fought back against them. When the Order's leader, Ahmed Sharif as-Senussi, abdicated his position, he was replaced by Idris, who was his cousin. Pressured to do so by the Ottoman Empire, Ahmed had pursued armed attacks against British military forces stationed in neighbouring Egypt. On taking power, Idris put a stop to these attacks.

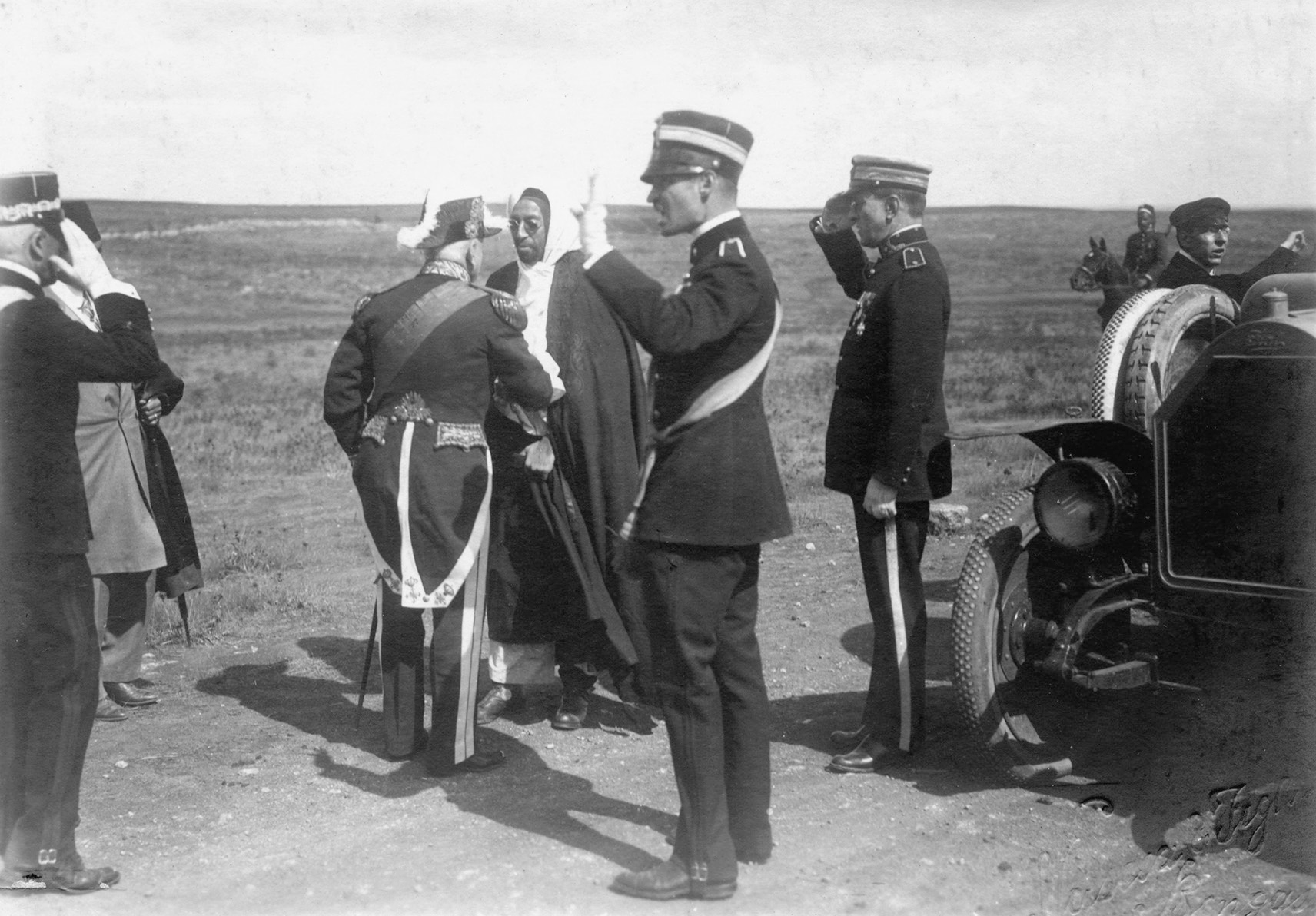
Sheikh Idris al-Senussi (later King Idris I of Libya) saluted by Italian soldiers, 1919

Instead he established a tacit alliance with the British, which would last for half a century and accord his order de facto diplomatic status. Using the British as intermediaries, Idris led the Order into negotiations with the Italians in July 1916. These resulted in two agreements, at al-Zuwaytina in April 1916 and at Akrama in April 1917. The latter of these treaties left most of inland Cyrenaica under the control of the Senussi Order. Relations between the Senussi Order and the newly established Tripolitanian Republic were acrimonious. The Senussi attempted to militarily extend their power into eastern Tripolitania, resulting in a pitched battle at Bani Walid in which the Senussi were forced to withdraw back into Cyrenaica.

At the end of World War I, the Ottoman Empire signed an armistice agreement in which they ceded their claims over Libya to Italy. Italy however was facing serious economic, social, and political problems domestically, and was not prepared to re-launch its military activities in Libya. It issued statutes known as the Legge Fondamentale with both the Tripolitanian Republic in June 1919 and Cyrenaica in October 1919. These brought about a compromise by which all Libyans were accorded the right to a joint Libyan-Italian citizenship while each province was to have its own parliament and governing council. The Senussi were largely happy with this arrangement and Idris visited Rome as part of the celebrations to mark the promulgation of the settlement.

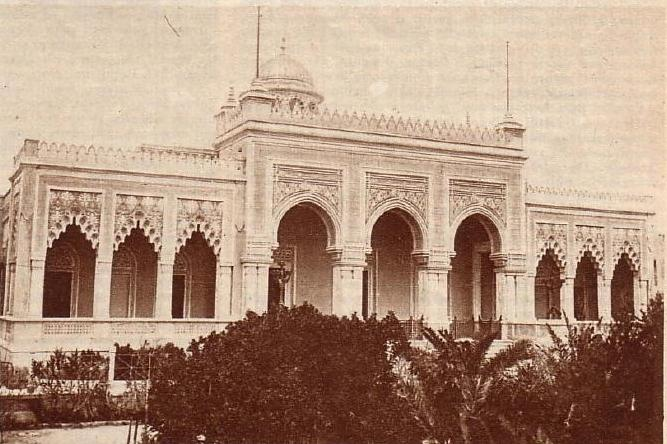
The Palazzo Littorio, later called the "Parliament of Cyrenaica", 1927

In October 1920, further negotiations between Italy and Cyrenaica resulted in the Accord of al-Rajma, in which Idris was given the title of the Emir of Cyrenaica and permitted to autonomously administer the oases around Kufra, Jalu, Jaghbub, Awjila, and Ajdabiya. As part of the Accord, he was given a monthly stipend by the Italian government, which agreed to take responsibility for policing and administration of areas under Senussi control. The Accord also stipulated that Idris must fulfill the requirements of the Legge Fondamentale by disbanding the Cyrenaican military units, however, he did not comply with this. By the end of 1921, relations between the Senussi Order and the Italian government had again deteriorated.

Following the death of Tripolitanian leader Ramadan Asswehly in August 1920, the Republic descended into civil war. Many tribal leaders in the region recognized that this discord was weakening the region's chances of attaining full autonomy from Italy, and in November 1920 they met in Gharyan to bring an end to the violence. In January 1922 they agreed to request that Idris extend the Sanui Emirate of Cyrenaica into Tripolitania in order to bring stability; they presented a formal document with this request on 28 July 1922. Idris' advisers were divided on whether he should accept the offer or not. Doing so would contravene the al-Rajma Agreement and would damage relations with the Italian government, which opposed the political unification of Cyrenaica and Tripolitania as being against their interests. Nevertheless, in November 1922 Idris agreed to the proposal. Following the agreement, Idris feared that Italy — under its new Fascist leader Benito Mussolini—would militarily retaliate against the Senussi Order, and so he went into exile in Egypt in December 1922.

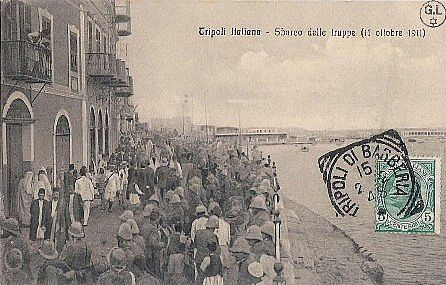
The Italian Army landing at the Port of Tripoli, 1911

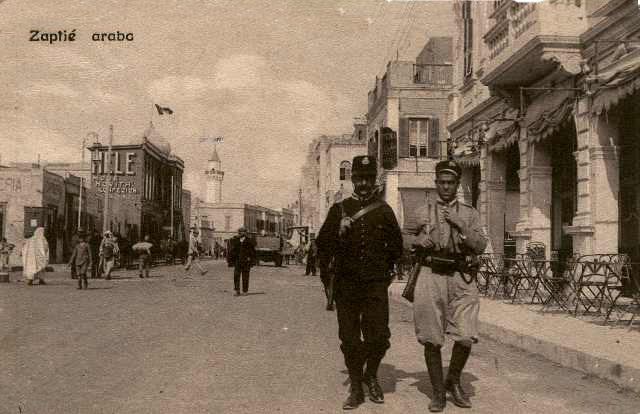
An Italian Carabiniere and an Arabic Zaptié patrolling in Tripoli, 1914

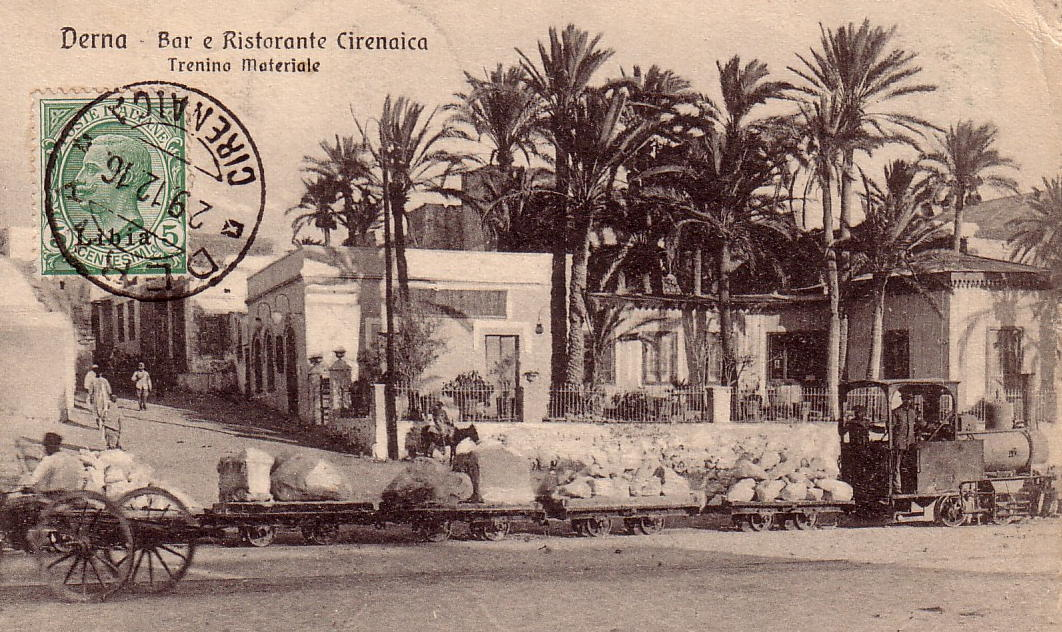
Restaurant and goods train in Derna (stamped on 29 December 1916)

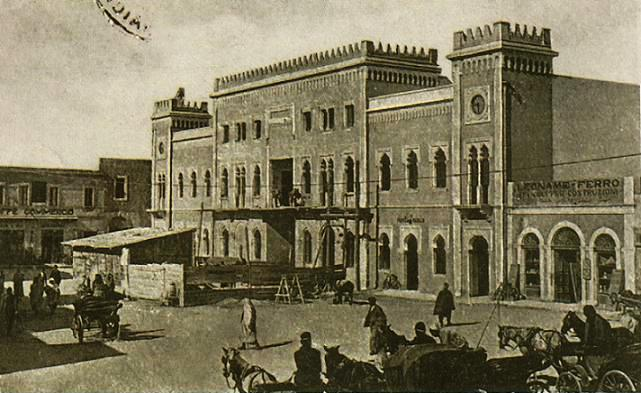
The Italian Benghazi Municipio (City Hall) in the 1920s

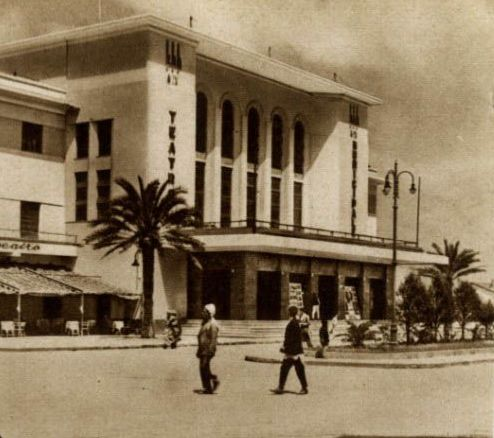
Berenice Theatre in Benghazi, opened in 1928 and designed by Marcello Piacentini

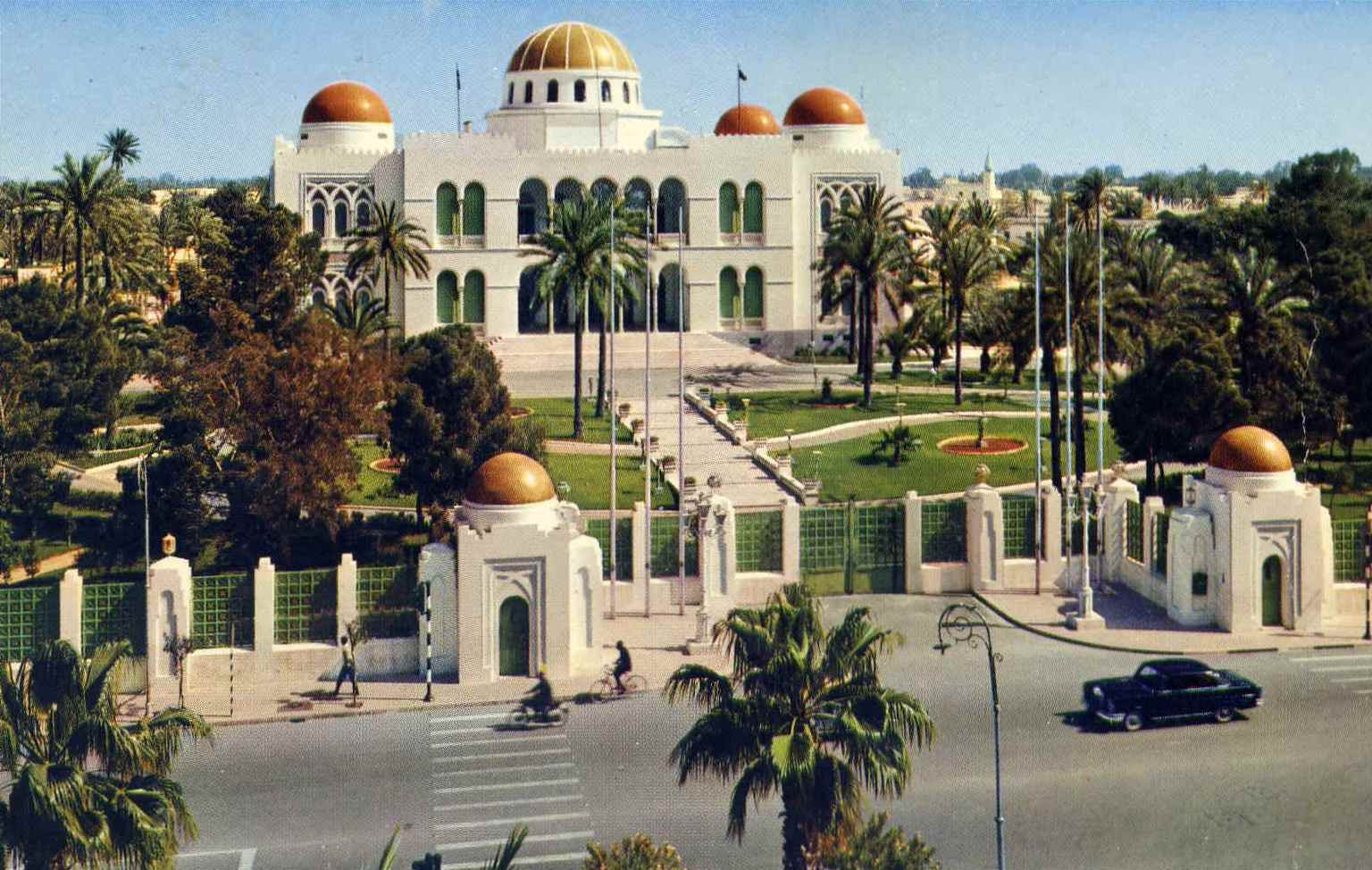
The Royal Palace of Tripoli

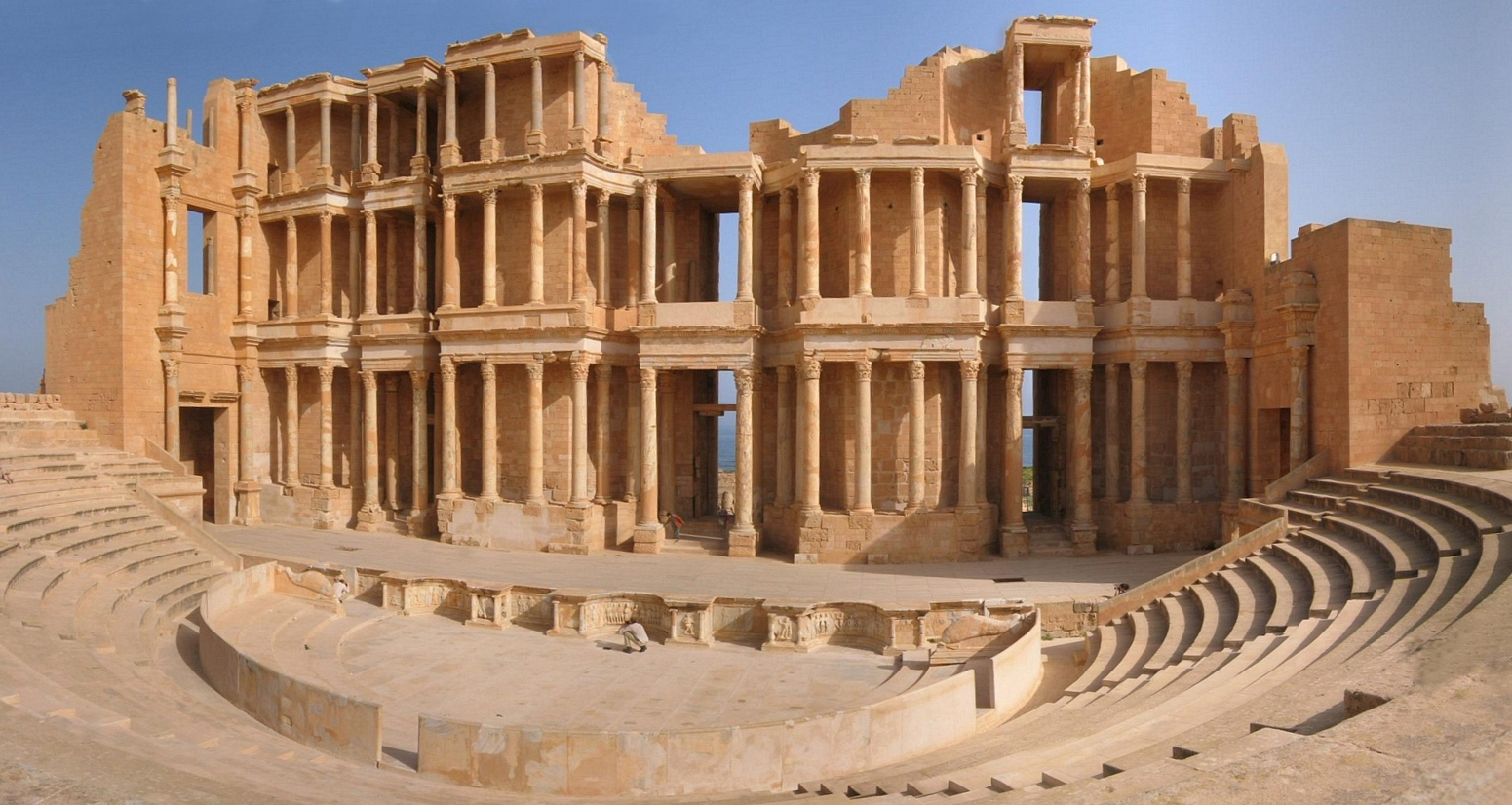
Roman theatre of Sabratha, restored during the Italian rule.

=== Second Italo-Senussi War ===
Territorial growth of Italian Libya: territory ceded by Ottoman Empire 1912 (dark-green) though effectively Italy controlled only five ports (black); territories ceded by France and Britain 1919 and 1926 (light-green); territories ceded by France and Britain 1934/35 (red)

After the accession to power of the dictator Benito Mussolini in Italy, the fighting intensified. Due to the Libyan people's effective resistance against Italy's so-called "pacification campaign", the Italian colonization of the Ottoman provinces of Tripolitania and Cyrenaica was initially unsuccessful and it was not until the early 1930s that the Kingdom of Italy took full control of the area. This conflict, known as the Second Italo-Senussi War, ultimately claimed the lives of around 56,000 Libyans.

Several reorganizations of the colonial authority had been made necessary because of armed Arab opposition, mainly in Cyrenaica. Between 1919 (17 May) to 1929 (24 January), the Italian government maintained the two traditional provinces, with separate colonial administrations. A system of controlled local assemblies with limited local authority was set up but was revoked on 9 March 1927. In 1929, Tripoli and Cyrenaica were united as one colonial province. From 1931 to 1932, Italian forces under General Badoglio waged a punitive pacification campaign. Badoglio's successor in the field, General Rodolfo Graziani, accepted the commission from Mussolini on the condition that he was allowed to crush Libyan resistance unencumbered by the restraints of either Italian or international law. Mussolini reportedly agreed immediately and Graziani intensified the oppression.

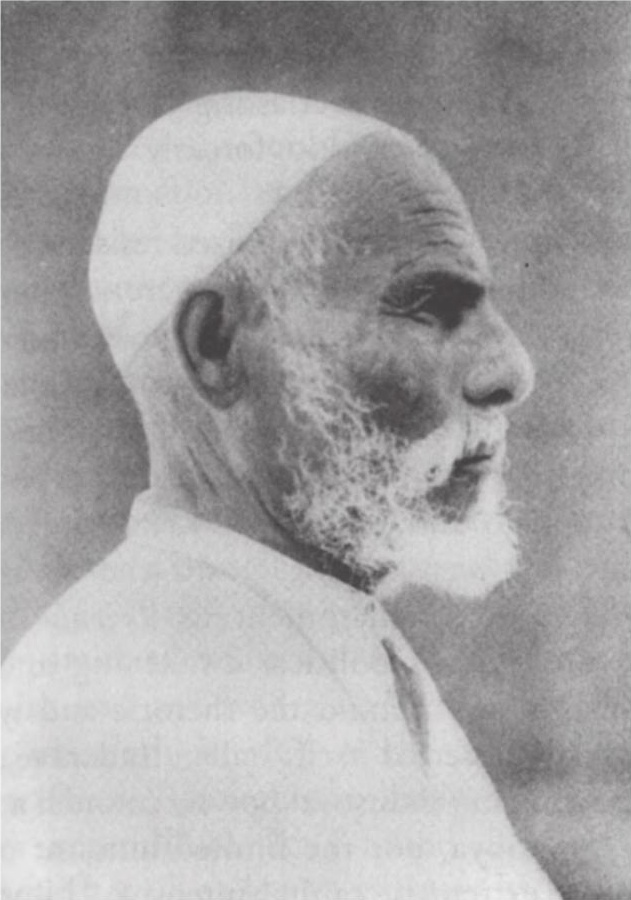
Omar Mukhtar was a prominent leader of Libyan resistance in Cyrenaica against Italian colonization.

Some Libyans continued to defend themselves, with the strongest voices of dissent coming from the Cyrenaica. Beginning in the first days of Italian colonization, Omar Mukhtar, a Senussi sheik, organized and, for nearly twenty years, led Libyan resistance efforts. His example continued to inspire resistance even after his capture and execution on 16 September 1931. His face is currently printed on the Libyan ten dinar note in memory and recognition of his patriotism.

After a much-disputed truce, the Italian policy in Libya reached the level of full-scale war in 1932. A barbed wire fence was built from the Mediterranean to the oasis of Jaghbub to sever lines critical to the resistance. Soon afterward, the colonial administration began wholesale deportation of the people of the Jebel Akhdar to deny the resistance to the support of the local population. The forced migration of more than 100,000 people ended in concentration camps in Suluq and El Agheila, where thousands died in squalid conditions. It is estimated that the number of Libyans who died, killed in the fighting or through starvation and disease is at least 80,000, up to one third of the Cyrenaican population.

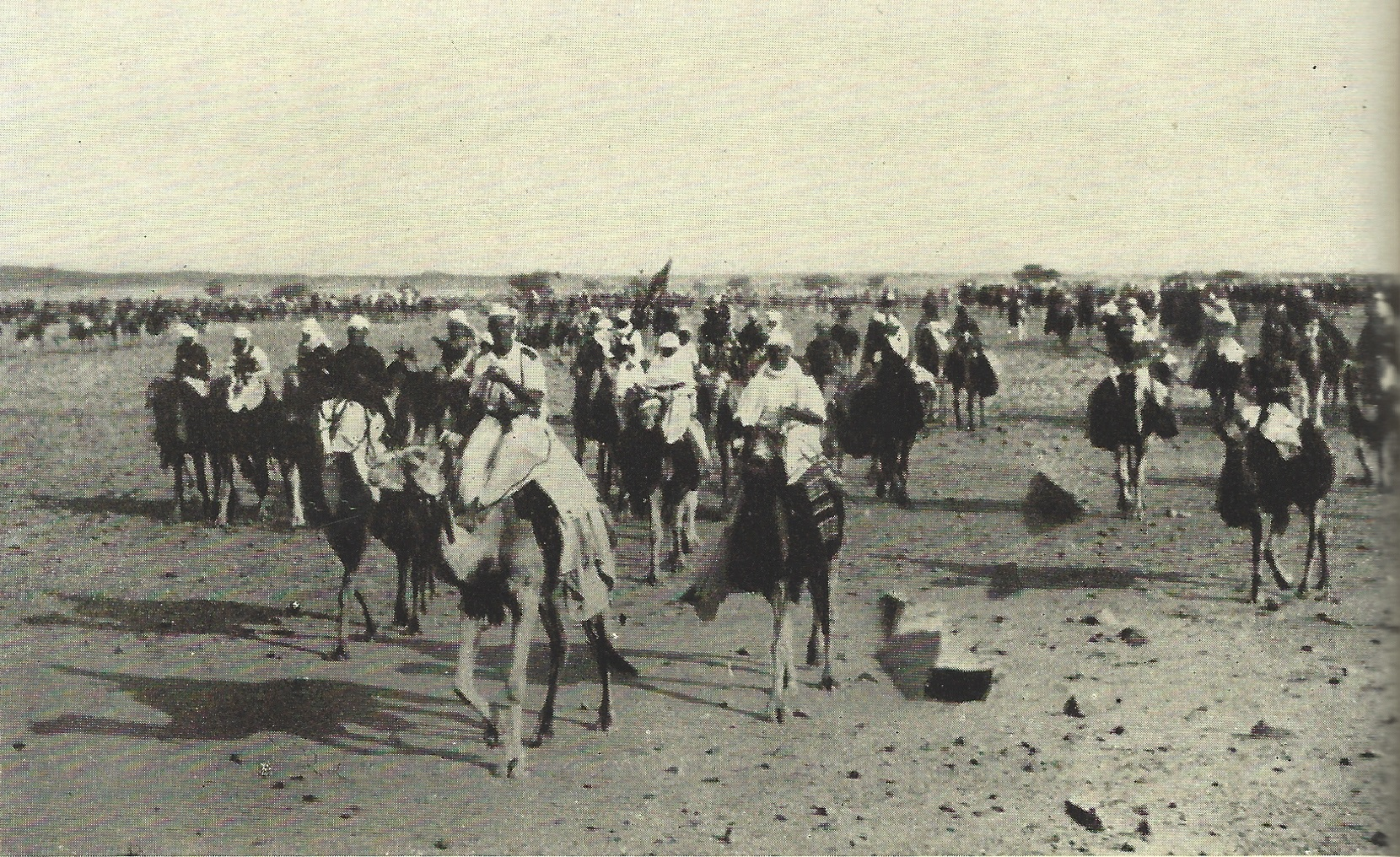
Meharists led by Amedeo D'aosta. Thousands of Libyans fought in the Italian colonial troops.

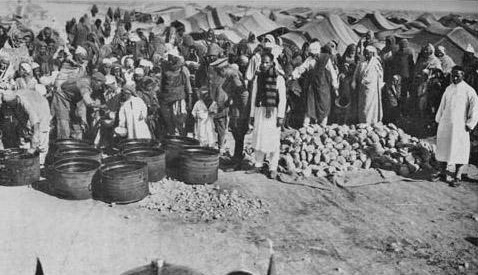
Inmates at the El Agheila concentration camp

Both sides committed war crimes: the Senussi forces who did not take prisoners of war since 1911 (as in the Shar Shatt massacre) and used to mutilate nearly all the Italian colonial troops (mainly the Christian Eritreans) when they surrendered. Italian war crimes included the use of illegal chemical weapons, episodes of refusing to take prisoners of war and instead of executing surrendering combatants, and mass executions of civilians. Italian authorities committed ethnic cleansing by forcibly expelling 100,000 local Cyrenaicans, almost half the population of Cyrenaica, from their settlements, slated to be given to Italian settlers. According to Knud Holmboe, tribal villages were being bombed with mustard gas by the spring of 1930, and suspects were hanged or shot in the back, with an estimated thirty executions taking place daily. Angelo Del Boca estimated between 40,000 and 70,000 total Libyan deaths due to forced deportations, starvation and disease inside the concentration camps, and hanging and executions. The Italian occupation also reduced the number of livestock by killing, confiscating, or driving the animals from their pastoral land to inhospitable land near the concentration camps. The number of sheep fell from 810,000 in 1926 to 98,000 in 1933, goats from 70,000 to 25,000, and camels from 75,000 to 2,000.

From 1930 to 1931, 12,000 Cyrenaicans died and all the nomadic peoples of northern Cyrenaica were forcefully removed from the region and relocated to huge concentration camps in the Cyrenaican lowlands. Propaganda by the Fascist regime declared the camps to be oases of modern civilization that were hygienic and efficiently run –– however, in reality, the camps had poor sanitary conditions as the camps had an average of about 20,000 inmates, together with their camels and other animals, crowded into an area of one square kilometer. The camps held only rudimentary medical services. The Soluch and Sisi Ahmed el Magrun concentration camps, with an estimated 33,000 internees, had only one doctor between them. Typhus and other diseases spread rapidly in the camps, as the people were physically weakened by forced labor and meager food rations. By the time the camps closed in September 1933, 40,000 of the 100,000 total internees had died in the camps.

== Italian Libya (1934–1943) ==
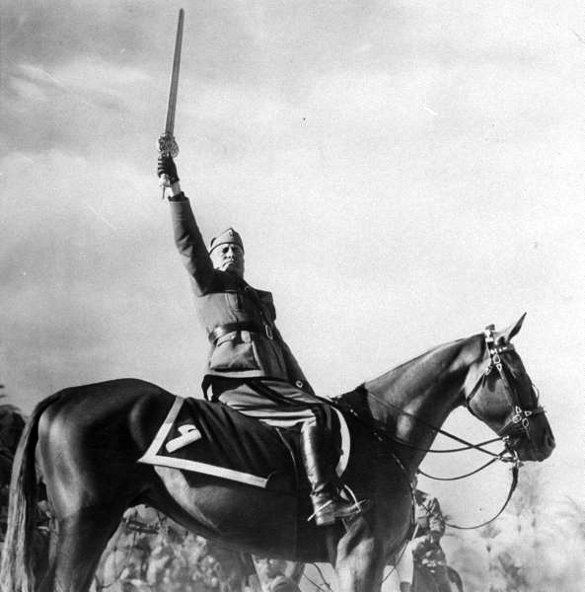
Mussolini with the so-called "Sword of Islam"

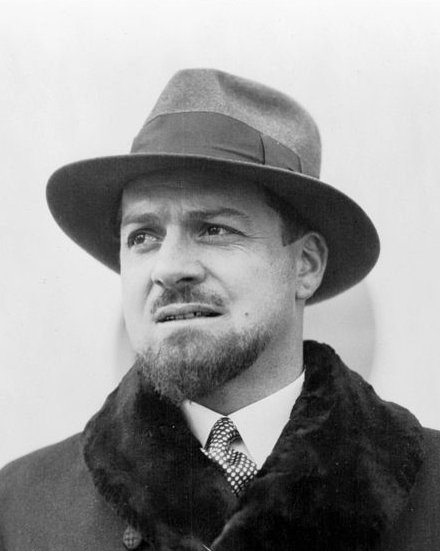
Italo Balbo

By 1934, Libyan indigenous resistance was effectively crushed. The new Italian governor, Italo Balbo, created the political entity called Italian Libya in the summer of that year. The classical name "Libya" was revived as the official name of the unified colony. Then in 1937 the colony was split administratively into four provinces: Tripoli, Misrata, Benghazi, and Derna. The Fezzan area was called Territorio Sahara Libico and administered militarily.

In March 1937 Mussolini made a state visit to Libya, where he opened a new military highway running the entire length of the colony (the Via Balbia). For propaganda reasons he had himself declared Protector of Islam and was presented with a symbolic sword. Mussolini's publicized encouragement of the Arab nationalist movement suited his wider policies of confronting Britain and France. He also sought to fully colonize Libya, introducing 30,000 more Italian colonists, which brought their numbers to more than 100,000. These colonists were shipped primarily to Sahel al-Jefara in Tripolitania and the Jebel Akhdar in Cyrenaica, and given land from which the indigenous inhabitants had been partially removed during the colonial war in the 1920s. At the time of the 1939 census, the Italian population in Libya numbered 108,419 (12.37% of the total population), concentrated on the coast around the city of Tripoli (37% of the city's population) and Benghazi (31%). The 22,000 Libyan Jews were allowed to integrate in the society of the "Fourth Shore", but after summer 1941, with the arrival of the German Afrika Korps, they began to be moved to internment camps under Nazi SS control.

On 9 January 1939, the coastal regions of the colony were incorporated into metropolitan Italy and thereafter considered by Italy to be an integral part of their state. By 1939, the Italians had built 400 km of new railroads and 4,000 km of new roads. During World War II a new road was still being built, the Via della Vittoria, and a new Tripoli-Benghazi railway. On 13 September 1940, Mussolini's highway was used for the invasion of Egypt by Italian forces stationed in Libya.

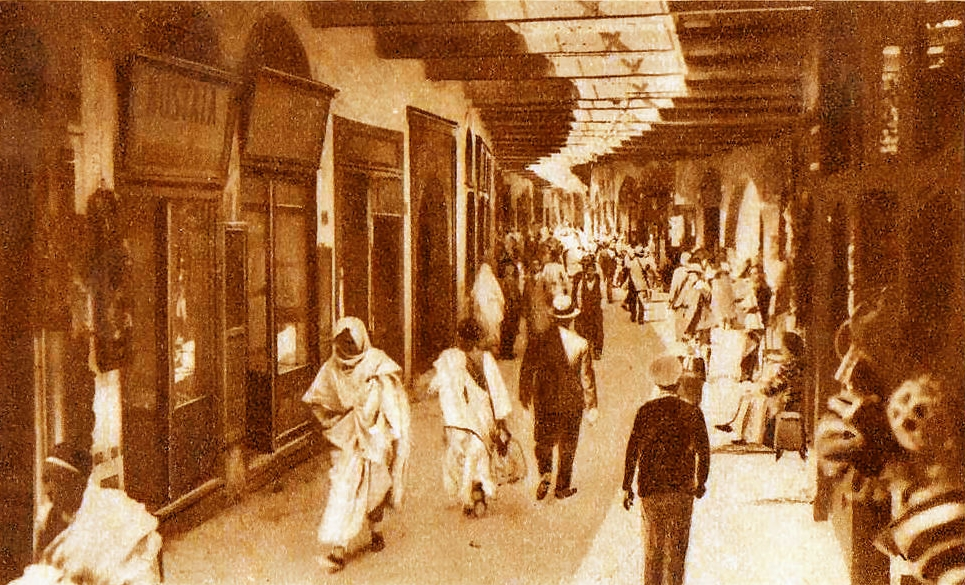
Italian settlers and indigenous Libyans in Tripoli, 1930s

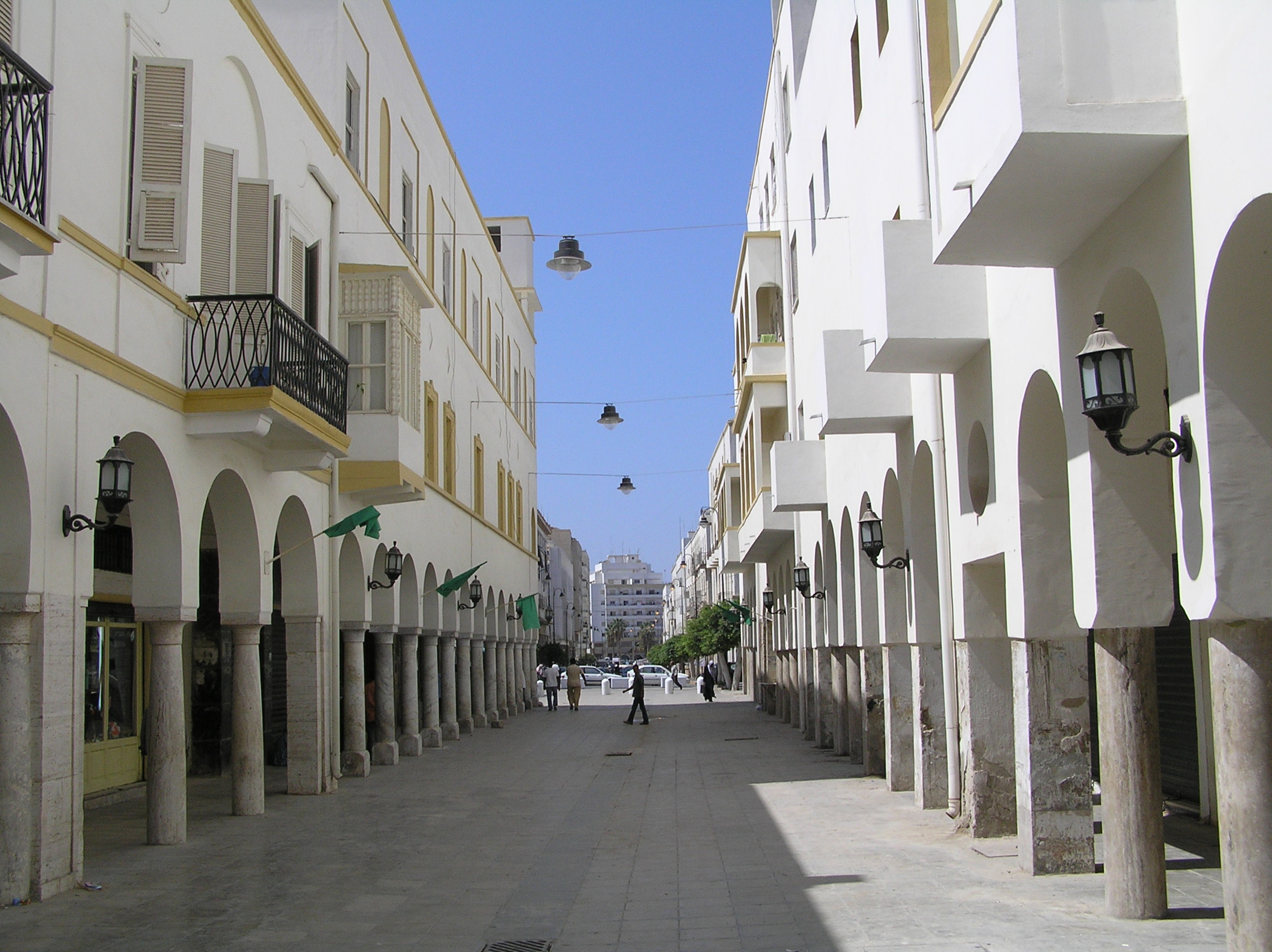
Omar Al Mukhtar Street (formerly "Via Roma") in Benghazi was home to many Italian settlers.

In 1939, laws were passed that allowed Muslims to be permitted to join the National Fascist Party and in particular the Muslim Association of the Lictor (Associazione Musulmana del Littorio). These reforms allowed the creation of Libyan military units within the Italian army (with 30,000 native Muslim soldiers). Two divisions of Libyan colonial troops were created (1st Libyan Division, 2nd Libyan Division), and in the summer of 1940 both participated in the Italian offensive against the British army in Egypt). A battalion of Libyan paratroopers was even raised shortly before World War II, the first force of this kind to be created in all of Africa. Other Libyan troops had been fighting for the Kingdom of Italy since the 1920s: the Savari (cavalry regiments) and the Spahi (mounted police).

Mussolini sought to assimilate the Arabs of Libya (whom he called "Muslim Italians") and so in 1939 ten villages were created for Arabs and Berbers:

- "El Fager" (It. Alba, En. Dawn), *"Nahima" (It. Deliziosa, En. Delicious),
- "Azizia" (It. Profumata, En. Perfumed),
- "Nahiba" (It. Risorta, En. Risen),
- "Mansura" (It. Vittoriosa, En. Victorious),
- "Chadra" (It. Verde, En. Green), *"Zahara" (It. Fiorita, En. Blossomed),
- "Gedina" (It. Nuova, En. New), *"Mamhura" (It. Fiorente, En. Flourished),
- "El Beida" (It. La Bianca, En. White).

All these new villages had their mosque, school, social centre (with sport grounds and cinema) and small hospital. This was purportedly a reward for the military performance of the Libyan colonial troops: in 1936 Savaris and other Libyan units took part in the Italian invasion of Ethiopia and received a "Gold Medal of Honour" for their distinguished performance in battle.

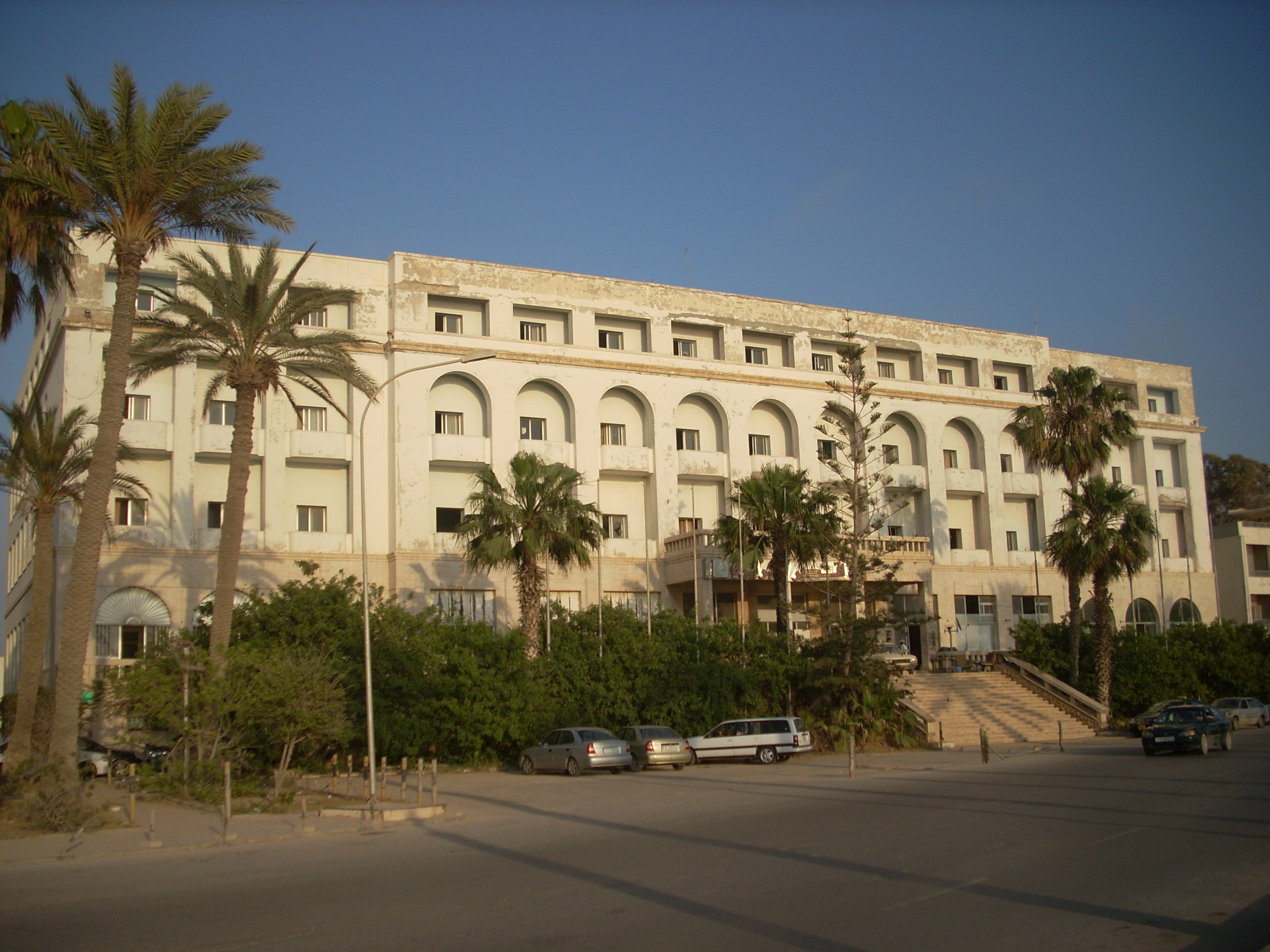
Berenice Hotel

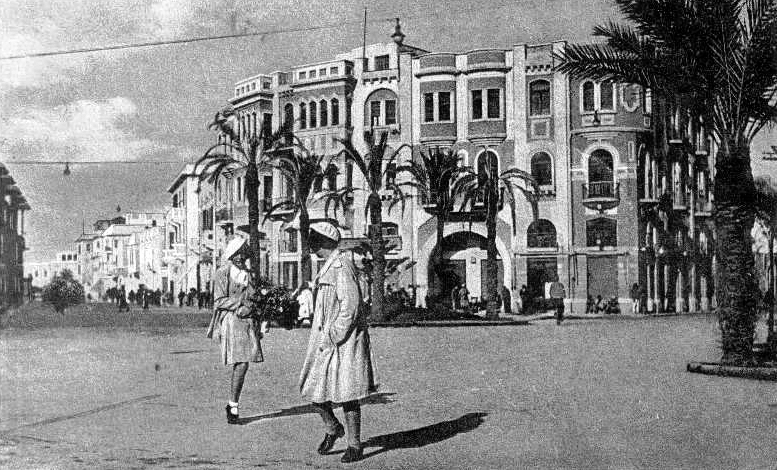
Women in Italian Benghazi

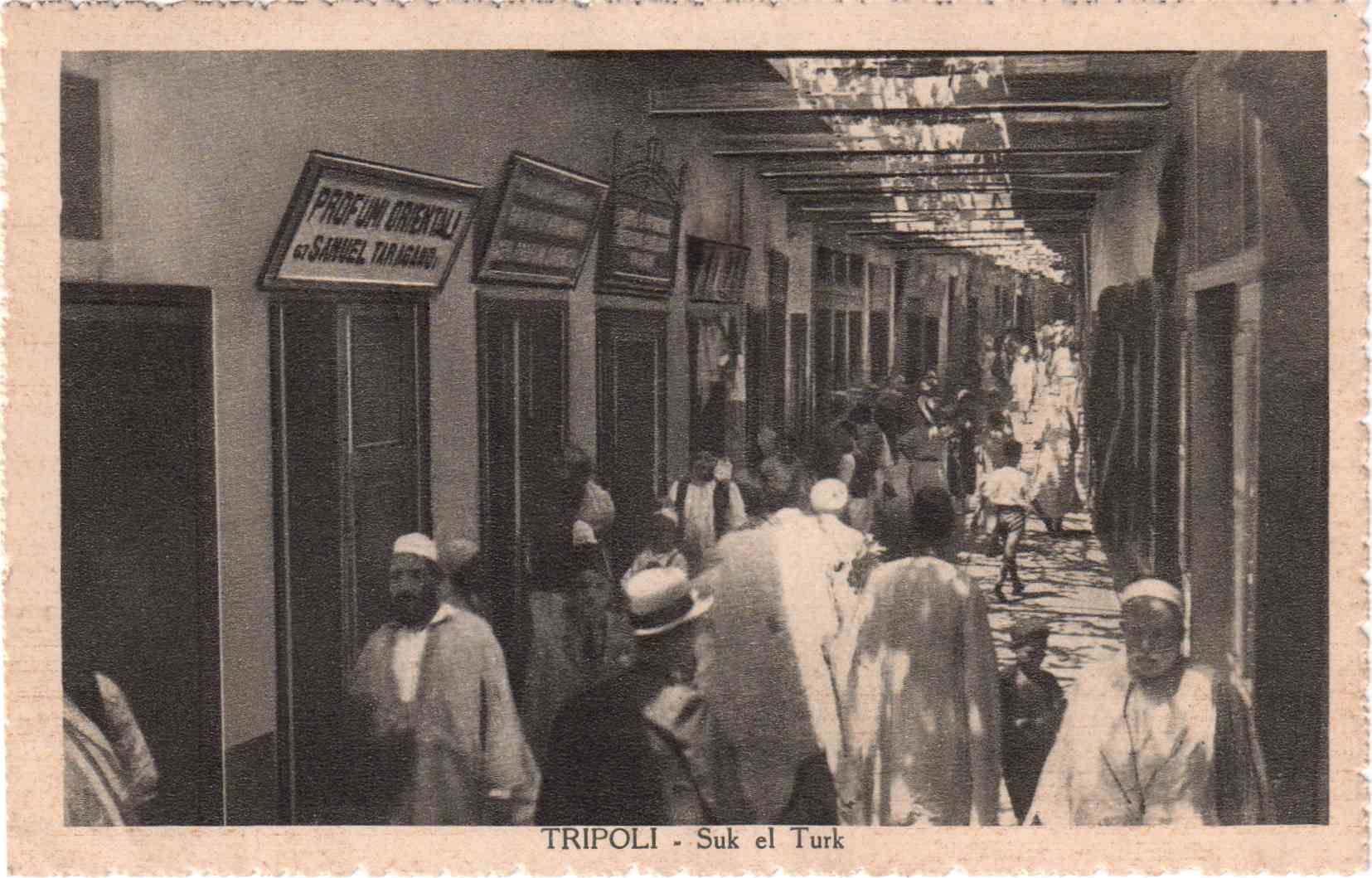
Suk el Turk market, 1935

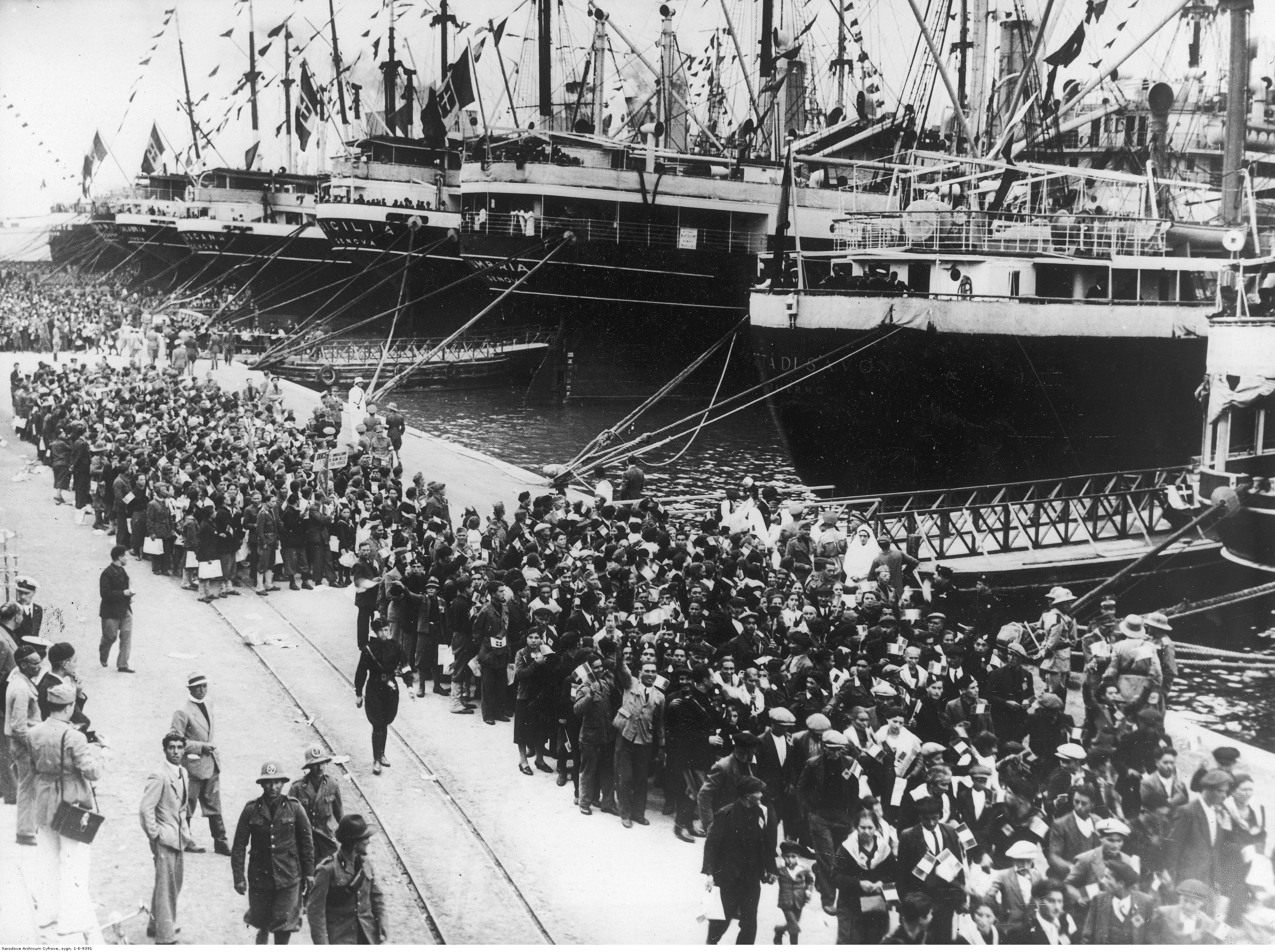
Italo Balbo welcomes Italian colonists in Libya, 1938

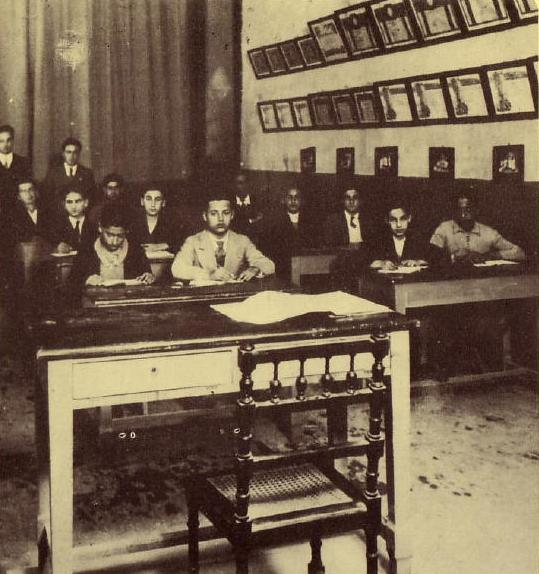
Benghazi Jews in synagogue classroom (1939)

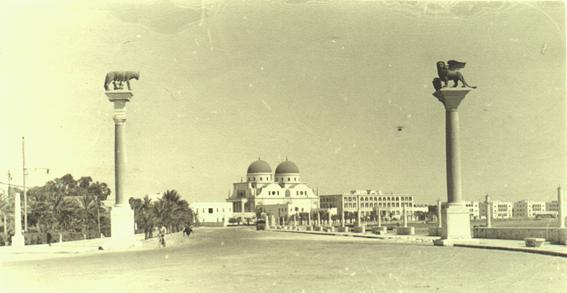
The Catholic Cathedral was connected to the "Via Vittoria", that had two columns featuring the Lion of Venice and the Capitoline Wolf

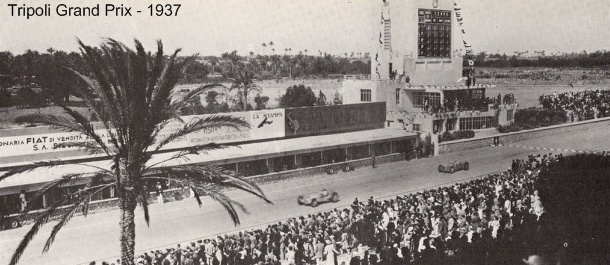
1937 Tripoli Grand Prix

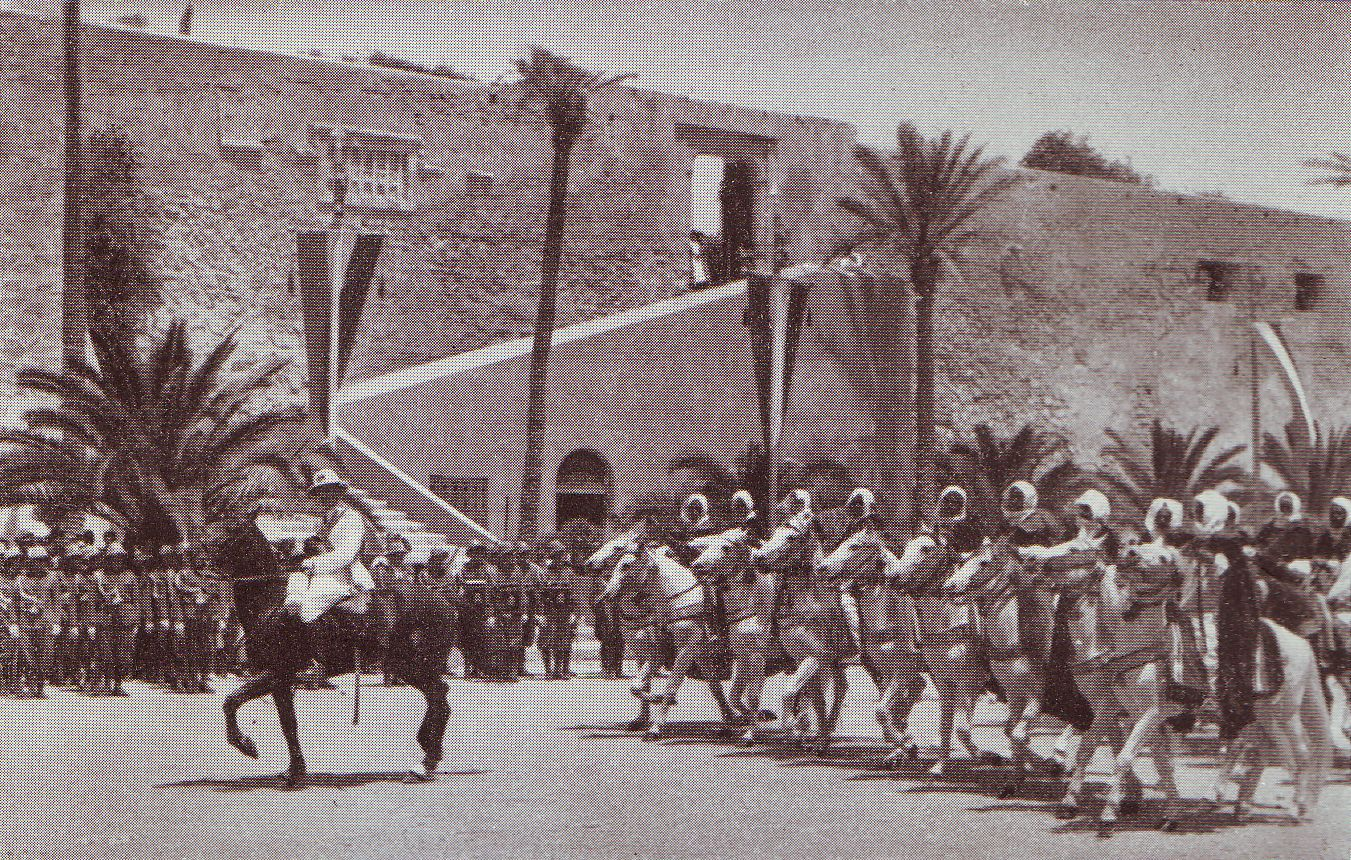
Spahis colonial troops, 1930s

== Decolonization ==
From 1943 to 1951, Libya was under Allied occupation. The British military administered the two former Italian Libyan provinces of Tripolitana and Cyrenaïca, while the French administered the province of Fezzan.

Under the terms of the 1947 peace treaty with the Allies, Italy, which hoped to maintain the colony of Tripolitania, (and France, which wanted the Fezzan), relinquished all claims to Libya. Libya remained united as it experienced the process of decolonization that characterized colonies of Europe in the mid-twentieth century.

Omar al-Mukhtar's final years were depicted in the movie Lion of the Desert (1981), starring Anthony Quinn, Oliver Reed, and Irene Papas. The Italian authorities had banned the film in 1982 because, in the words of Giulio Andreotti, it was "damaging to the honor of the army".

In July 1998, the Italian government offered a formal apology to Libya. In August 2008 the two nations signed a treaty of friendship in which US$5 billion in goods and services, including the construction of the Libyan portion of the Cairo-Tunis highway, would be given to Libya to end any remaining animosity. In exchange, Libya would take measures to combat illegal immigration coming from its shores and boost investments in Italian companies. The treaty was ratified by Italy on 6 February 2009, and by Libya on 2 March, during a visit to Tripoli by Silvio Berlusconi, who recognized historic atrocities and repression committed by the state of Italy against the Libyan people during colonial rule, stating: "In this historic document, Italy apologizes for its killing, destruction and repression of the Libyan people during the period of colonial rule." and went on to say that this was a "complete and moral acknowledgement of the damage inflicted on Libya by Italy during the colonial era".

Cooperation ended in February 2011 as a result of the Libyan Civil War which overthrew Gaddafi. On 26 September 2011, Italian energy company Eni announced it had restarted oil production in Libya for the first time since the start of the 2011 Libyan civil war. The quick return of Eni to Libyan oilfields reflected the positive relations between Rome and Tripoli. The Italian embassy in Tripoli is one of the few Western embassies still active in Libya during the Post-civil war violence in Libya, because Italy is the most important trade partner for Libya.

== See also ==
- List of colonial heads of Libya
- Italian Libya, 1934–1943
- Fourth Shore
- Italo Balbo
- Italy–Libya relations
- Savari
- Spahi
- Ascari del Cielo
- Italian Libyan Colonial Division
- Tripoli Grand Prix
- Italian Empire
- Via Balbia
- Via della Vittoria
- Italian Libya Railways
- Aouzou Strip

== Bibliography ==
- Bearman, Jonathan (1986). Qadhafi's Libya. London: Zed Books. ISBN 978-0-86232-434-6.
- St. John, Ronald Bruce (2012). Libya: From Colony to Revolution (revised ed.). Oxford: Oneworld. ISBN 978-1-85168-919-4.
- Chapin Metz, Helen, ed., Libya: A Country Study. Washington: GPO for the Library of Congress, 1987.
- Foerster, Robert. The Italian Emigration of Our Times. Ayer Publishing. Manchester (New Hampshire), 1969. ISBN 0-405-00522-9
- Smeaton Munro, Ion. Through Fascism to World Power: A History of the Revolution in Italy. Ayer Publishing. Manchester (New Hampshire), 1971. ISBN 0-8369-5912-4
- Tuccimei, Ercole. La Banca d'Italia in Africa, Foreword by Arnaldo Mauri, Editori Laterza, Bari, 1999. ISBN 88-420-5686-3.
- Vandewalle, Dirk (2006). A History of Modern Libya. Cambridge: Cambridge University Press. ISBN 978-0521615549.
