= Lion of the Desert =

1981 film by Moustapha Akkad

- Theatrical poster
- Directed by: Moustapha Akkad
- Written by: H.A.L. Craig
- Produced by: Moustapha Akkad
- Starring: Anthony Quinn; Oliver Reed; Rod Steiger; Raf Vallone
- Cinematography: Jack Hildyard
- Edited by: John Shirley
- Music by: Maurice Jarre
- Production company: Falcon International Productions
- Distributed by: United Film Distribution Company
- Release date: 17 April 1981; 27 August 1981 (United Kingdom)
- Running time: 173 minutes
- Countries: Libya; United States
- Languages: English; Arabic; Italian
- Budget: US$35 million
- Box office: $1 million (U.S.)

Lion of the Desert (alternative titles: Omar Mukhtar and Omar Mukhtar: Lion of the Desert) is a 1981 epic historical war film about the Second Italo-Senussi War, starring Anthony Quinn as Libyan tribal leader Omar Mukhtar, a Bedouin leader fighting the Regio Esercito (Royal Italian Army), and Oliver Reed as Italian General Rodolfo Graziani, who defeated Mukhtar. It was directed by Syrian-American director Moustapha Akkad, and financed by the Libyan government under Muammar Gaddafi.

Released in May 1981, the film has received positive reviews from critics, but performed poorly at the box office, gaining revenues of US$1.5 million worldwide despite having a $35 million budget. The film was banned in Italy in 1982 and was only shown on pay TV in 2009.

== Plot ==
In 1929, Italian fascist dictator Benito Mussolini is still faced with the 10-year-long war waged by patriots in the Italian colony of Libya to combat Italian colonization and the establishment of "The Fourth Shore"—the rebirth of a Roman Empire in Africa. Mussolini appoints General Rodolfo Graziani as his sixth governor of Libya, confident that the eminently accredited soldier and fascist Grande can crush the rebellion and restore the dissipated glories of Imperial Rome. Omar al-Mukhtar leads the resistance to the fascists. A teacher by profession, guerrilla by obligation, Mukhtar had committed himself to a war that cannot be won in his own lifetime. Graziani controls Libya with the might of the Regio Esercito (Royal Italian Army). Tanks and aircraft are used in the desert for the first time. The Italians also committed atrocities—killing of prisoners of war, destruction of crops, and imprisoning populations in concentration camps behind barbed wire.

The film starts by introducing the audience to the historical context. This introductory scene is part of historic records that present the rise of fascism in Italy and how it impacted Libya tragically. The scene concludes by stating that the characters and the events in this film are real and based on historical facts. The first scene after the introduction starts with Mussolini in Italy, who created the Fascist Party in Italy, complaining about his generals’ defeats in Libya. To crush the Libyan resistance after 20 years of failure, and after losing five of the best Italian generals, Mussolini sends his most skillful general, Graziani, to Libya. This scene is then contrasted with a scene of Omar Al-Mukhtar, the old teacher who turned into a fighting rebel during the Italian colonization, teaching his young students in Libya. Graziani goes to Libya and starts his campaign to crush the rebellion. The Libyans show great tenacity and make enormous sacrifices to defend their country.

Despite their bravery, the Libyan Arabs and Berbers suffer heavy losses, because their relatively primitive weaponry is no match for mechanised warfare; despite all this, they continue to fight and manage to keep the Italians from achieving complete victory for 20 years. Graziani is only able to achieve victory through deceit, deception, violation of the laws of war and human rights, and by the use of tanks and aircraft.

Omar Al-Mukhtar shows great perseverance and wisdom in leading the resistance movement. He enters into negotiations with the Italians to liberate Libya, but never reaches a deal with them because they pretend to negotiate only to win time. They ask him for significant concessions and promise him some materialistic rewards to end the resistance movement, but Al-Mukhtar never accepts any of that, even after they capture him. They hang him in public to show the Libyans that resisting them is useless, but the resistance does not stop with Al-Mukhtar's death.

Despite the Libyans' lack of modern weaponry, Graziani recognizes the skill of his adversary in waging guerrilla warfare. In one scene, Al-Mukhtar refuses to kill a defenseless young officer, instead giving him the Italian flag to bring home to Italy. Mukhtar says that Islam forbids him from killing captured soldiers and demands that he only fight for his homeland, and that Muslims are taught to hate war itself.

In the end, Mukhtar is captured and tried as a rebel. His lawyer, Captain Lontano, states that since Mukhtar had never accepted Italian rule, he cannot be tried as a rebel and instead must be treated as a prisoner of war (which would save him from being hanged). The judge rejects this assertion, and the film ends with Mukthar being publicly executed by hanging.

== Cast ==
- Anthony Quinn as Omar al-Mukhtar
- Oliver Reed as General Rodolfo Graziani
- Irene Papas as Mabrouka
- Raf Vallone as Diodiece
- Rod Steiger as Mussolini
- John Gielgud as El Gariani
- Andrew Keir as Salem
- Gastone Moschin as Tomelli
- Stefano Patrizi as Sandrini
- Adolfo Lastretti as Sarsani
- Sky du Mont as Prince Amedeo, Duke of Aosta
- Takis Emmanuel as Bu-Matari
- Rodolfo Bigotti as Ismail
- Robert Brown as Al Fadeel
- Eleonora Stathopoulou as Ali's Mother
- Luciano Bartoli as Captain Lontano
- Claudio Gora as Court President
- Giordano Falzoni as Judge at Camp
- Franco Fantasia as Graziani's Aide
- Ihab Werfaly as Ali

== Production ==
The movie was filmed between March 4 and October 2, 1979 in Libya, with the production team living in "living camps" complete with air conditioning, a restaurant, library, billiards, Ping-Pong tables, discotheque, swimming pool, and movie theater. The movie was financed by the Libyan government under the leadership of Muammar Gaddafi on a budget of US$35 million.

== Music ==
The musical score of Lion of the Desert was composed and conducted by Maurice Jarre, and performed by the London Symphony Orchestra. The songs "Giovinezza", "Marcia Reale", and "O sole mio" are played, but are not credited.

=== Soundtrack ===
==== Track listing for the first release on LP ====
===== Side one (19:12) =====
1. Omar the Teacher
2. Italian Invasion
3. Resistance
4. The Lion of the Desert

===== Side two (19:33) =====
1. The Displacement
2. The Concentration Camp
3. The Death
4. March of Freedom

==== Track listing for the first release on CD ====
1. Omar the Teacher (04:26)
2. Prelude: Libya 1929 (02:24)
3. The Execution of Hamid (05:04)
4. Desert Ambush (01:46)
5. Omar Enters Camp (04:15)
6. The Empty Saddle
7. March to Demination (05:19)
8. Ismail's Sacrifice (02:36)
9. I Must Go (02:27)
10. Graziani's Triumph (01:41)
11. Entr'acte (02:19)
12. Concentration Camp (03:15)
13. Italian Invasion (01:32)
14. Starvation (00:53)
15. The Hanging (01:27)
16. General Graziani (03:00)
17. Charge (01:23)
18. Phoney Triumph (04:38)
19. Omar's Wife (03:22)
20. Omar Taken (02:38)
21. The Death of Omar (01:38)
22. March of Freedom (With Choir) (03:59)

== Censorship in Italy ==
The Italian authorities banned the film in 1982 because, in the words of Prime Minister Giulio Andreotti, it was "damaging to the honor of the army". The last act of the government's intervention against the film was on April 7, 1987, in Trento; afterward, MPs from Democrazia Proletaria asked Parliament to show the movie at the Chamber of Deputies.

The movie was finally broadcast on television in Italy by Sky Italia on June 11, 2009, during the official visit to Italy of Libya's then dictator Muammar Gaddafi, whose government funded the movie.

== Reception ==
Cinema historian Stuart Galbraith IV wrote that the movie was: "A fascinating look inside a facet of Arab culture profoundly significant yet virtually unknown outside North Africa and the Arab world. Lion of the Desert is a Spartacus-style, David vs. Goliath tale that deserves more respect than it has to date. It's not a great film, but by the end, it becomes a compelling one." Film critic Vincent Canby wrote: "Spectacular… virtually an unending series of big battle scenes." The verdict of British historian Alex von Tunzelmann about the movie was: "Omar Mukhtar has been adopted as a figurehead by many Libyan political movements, including both Gaddafi himself and the rebels currently fighting him. Lion of the Desert is half an hour too long and hammy in places, but its depiction of Italian colonialism and Libyan resistance is broadly accurate." Clint Morris of Film Threat described the movie as: "A grand epic adventure that'll stand as a highpoint in the producing career of Moustapha Akkad."

On the other hand, film critic C.W. Smith wrote that the "multimillion-dollar spectacular turns out to be a two-hour-and-forty-minute yawn". He complained that the bias in the portrayal of characters was obvious, saying that Graziani was portrayed as a "comic book caricature of a Nazi storm trooper."

On the review aggregator website Rotten Tomatoes, 75% of 8 critics' reviews are positive, with an average rating of 7.3/10.

The film made $1 million at the box office on its original U.S. release.

== See also ==
- The Battle of Algiers, a similar movie about Algerian resistance against French occupation
- Libyan resistance movement
- Italian Libya
- List of Islamic films
- The Message
- Fakhri Pasha, Defender of Madinah known as "The Lion of the Desert"
