= Italian Libyan Colonial Division =

Formation of colonial troops raised by the Italians in Libya

The Libyan Division (Italian: "Divisione Coloniale Libia Italiana" or "Divisione Coloniale Libia") was a formation of colonial troops raised by the Italians in their colony in Libya, following the invasion of 1911. It participated in the invasion of Ethiopia in the Second Italo-Abyssinian War by the orders of Benito Mussolini in October 1935. Following the capture of Addis Ababa in May 1936, King Vittorio Emanuele III was proclaimed Emperor of Ethiopia (Imperatore d'Etiopia), following the proclamation of Italian East Africa (Africa Orientale Italiana). The formation was reorganized into the 1st Libyan Division by the beginning of Italy's entry into World War II. In September 1940, the 1st Libyan Division, together with its sister-division 2nd Libyan Division, participated in the Italian invasion of Egypt. By December, the division was dug in at Maktila and was forced to surrender during Operation Compass.

== Origins ==
Following the Italo-Turkish War of 1911-12, Italy occupied the coastal zones of the twin provinces of Tripolitania and Cyrenaica, constituting modern Libya. The Italians continued to face very strong opposition from the Senussi, especially in Cyrenaica. From the beginning the Italian Army made use of the former Turkish organised Arab gendarmerie as auxiliaries, augmenting them with regular colonial units recruited amongst the indigenous peoples of Libya. By 1913 these comprised seven battalions of infantry, three squadrons of savari cavalry, one squadron of meharistes (camel troops), a mountain artillery battery and a section of camel artillery.

By the 1930s, the Libyan units had been brought together into the "Royal Corps of Libyan Troops" comprising infantry, cavalry, artillery, motorised troops and support services. A battalion of Libyan parachutists was raised shortly before World War II, the first force of this kind to be created in Africa. Libyans also served in zaptie (carabinieri), Sahariani (desert troops) and spahi (irregular cavalry) units, with Libyans serving the Italian Empire (Impero Italiano) since the invasion in 1911, near the border of Egypt.

== Order of Battle 3 October 1935 ==
Libyan Division - Guglielmo Nasi

- 1st Libyan Infantry Regiment
  - II Libyan Battalion
  - III Libyan Battalion
- 2nd Libyan Infantry Regiment
  - IV Libyan Battalion
  - V Libyan Battalion
- 3rd Libyan Infantry Regiment
  - VIII Libyan Battalion
  - IX Libyan Battalion
- X Libyan Battalion
- 1st Libyan Artillery Regiment
