= Modern history of Libya =

Articles on the modern history of Libya:

- Tripolitania Vilayet (1864-1911)
- History of Libya as Italian colony (1911-1943)
- World War II and Allied occupation, see Libya during World War II
- Kingdom of Libya (1951-1969)
- Libya under Gaddafi (1969-present)
