= Savino Varazzani =

Italian politician

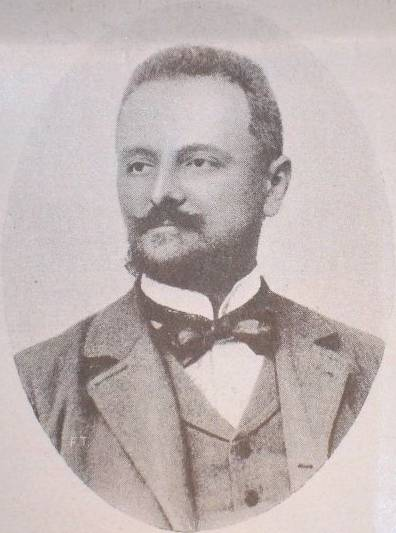
Savino Varazzani

Savino Varazzani (Piacenza, March 21, 1858 - Milan, February 3, 1938) was an Italian politician and journalist. He was a teacher, writer and journalist, who served as chairman of Avanti! della Domenica.

He was elected to the Chamber of Deputies in the XXI legislature (1900-1904) for the constituency of Piacenza. He was a candidate for the following legislature, albeit reluctantly, in the supplementary elections for the Grosseto constituency, but was not elected.

In 1912, along with a number of others, he left the Socialist Party in protest against its opposition to the Italian invasion of Libya. In 1928 he joined the National Fascist Party and in 1930 published a book entitled Confessioni d'un galantuomo: (dà socialista a fascista) (Confessions of a Gentleman: from socialist to fascist).

The city of Piacenza has a Via Savino Varazzani named after him.

== Published works ==
Varazzani published a number of books of a literary, historical, philosophical and biographical nature:

- Brutta! e altre novelle (1914)
- Origini, effetti e prospettive della Guerra europea: raccolta di conferenze tenute presso l'Università Popolare Milanese (Novembre 1914-Aprile 1915) (1915)
- Povera Zampina! : Novelle e bozzetti (1920)
- Vita di Socrate (1922)
- Colloqui con la mia morta (1925)
- Conferenze su la storia di Milano: tenute per l'Istituto di cultura 'Nuova vita' (1929)
- Confessioni d'un galantuomo: (da socialista a fascista) (1930)
