= We Will Not Surrender (We Win or We Die) =

Single by Rami El-Kaleh
- Released: 11 March 2011
- Recorded: 4–8 March 2011
- Genre: Soft rock
- Songwriter(s): Rami El-Kaleh; Jasmine "Dadoo" Icanovic; Moftah Essallak; Mustafa "Boofa" Eddali
- Producer(s): Jasmine Icanovic

"We Will Not Surrender (We Win or We Die)" is a song by Libyan-Irish musician Rami El-Kaleh about the Libyan Civil War. The song has become one of the most popular protest songs in the Arab World and in Europe. The lyrics are co-written by Rami El-Kaleh who was born on 16 July 1983 in Waterford, Ireland, but who had returned to Libya at a young age. El-Kaleh was also a computer engineering graduate and a guitar musician. He died before seeing his song launched and for that the single serves as a memorial to him. He held dual Libyan-Irish citizenship.

The title and opening words of the song are quotes taken from a speech by Omar Mukhtar, a famous Libyan resistance fighter who fought against the Italians in the 1930s. "We will not surrender / We win or we die / Our flag will not fall down / It will wave up high forever".

The song is co-authored by El-Kaleh and Jasmine "Dadoo" Icanovic, a Bosnian Muslim who moved to Libya in 1992 after the breakup of Yugoslavia. In 2000, he met Rami El-Kaleh, then an 18-year-old guitarist. Icanovic and El-Kaleh began writing the song on 4 March 2011 and finished it on 8 March. Hussain Kablan (rhythm guitarist and vocalist of Guys UnderGround) provided the vocals for the song. The song was written as a collaboration by Rami Dadoo and "friends", that being Motaz Elgaddary, Moftah Essallak and Mustafa "Boofa" Eddali, the last of which joins Dadoo's young daughter in the singing of the last few bars. All three appear in clips of the music video.

They had decided to record the song in English to let the world know what was happening. On 8 March 2011, Rami El-Kaleh was shot in a targeted killing by Muammar Gaddafi loyalists in Benghazi and died instantly from a bullet that pierced his heart. He had gone to pick up his brother from a friend's house in Benghazi and was to return to Dadoo's home, to re-record his guitar solo part. The song was released as a single credited to "Rami El-Kaleh and Friends" in his memory.

== Charts ==
There was extensive media coverage on the circumstances of how the song came to be and Rami El-Kaleh's tragic death. It immediately became popular, charting in many European countries. The most successful was in Denmark, where it charted on ChartBase Top-100 for 7 weeks reaching No. 44 as its highest chart position.
