= Zawiyat Janzur =

Zawiyat Janzur زاوية جنزور Zawiat Janzur
- Village
- Location in Libya
- Coordinates: 31°58′14″N 24°44′52″E
- Country: Libya
- District: Butnan
- Time zone: UTC+2 (EET)

Zawiyat Janzur, or Zawiyat Zanzur, also Zauiet Gianzur is a small coastal village located at Cyrenaica in eastern Libya. It's linked by road with Bi'r al Ashhab to the south.

Janzur is known as the birthplace of Omar Mukhtar, the Libyan resistance leader during the Italian rule.
