= Sharif El Gariani =

Libyan sheikh (1877–1945)

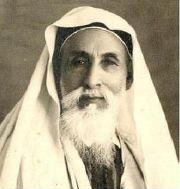
Sharif El Gariani

Sharif El Gariani (Arabic: الشارف الغرياني, romanized: ash-Shārif al-Gharyānī; 1877–1945) was a Libyan religious sheikh and statesman.

Born in Janzour, near Tobruk, Libya, he was the nephew of Hussein El Gariani (from Gharyan in western Libya), co-founder of the first senussi Zawia at Bayda in 1844, and the man who was friends with a boy named Omar Mukhtar, (the future resistance leader in Cyrenaica against the Italian invasion).

After the Italian invasion of Libya in 1911, Sharif had believed that the Italians were invincible, and this led to a long-term disagreement with his old friend Omar Mukhtar. His role in the next twenty years was to be a mediator between the resistance leaders and the Italian government in Libya.
