= El Uweilia =

El Uweilia العويلية
- Location in Libya
- Coordinates: 32°33′21″N 20°59′19″E
- Country: Libya
- District: District

Population (1995)
  - Total: 7,508
- Time zone: UTC+2 (EET)

El Uweilia (Arabic: العويلية) is a village in the Jebel Akhdar mountains foothills region in Libya. It is located some 16 km (9.9 mi) east of Marj and 89 km (55 mi) west of Bayda.

During the Italian occupation it was known Maddalena after the Italian aviator Umberto Maddalena.

== Photo gallery ==
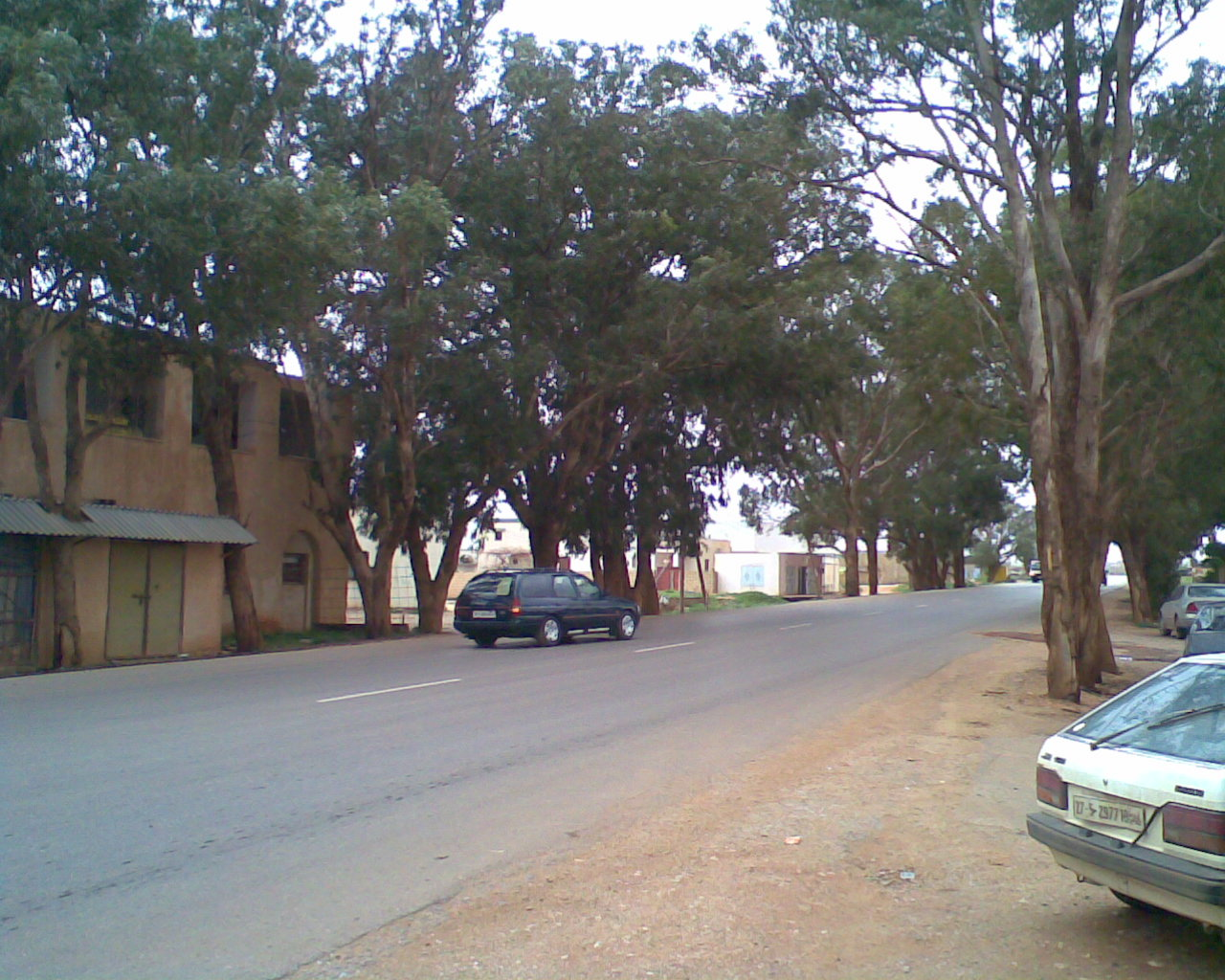

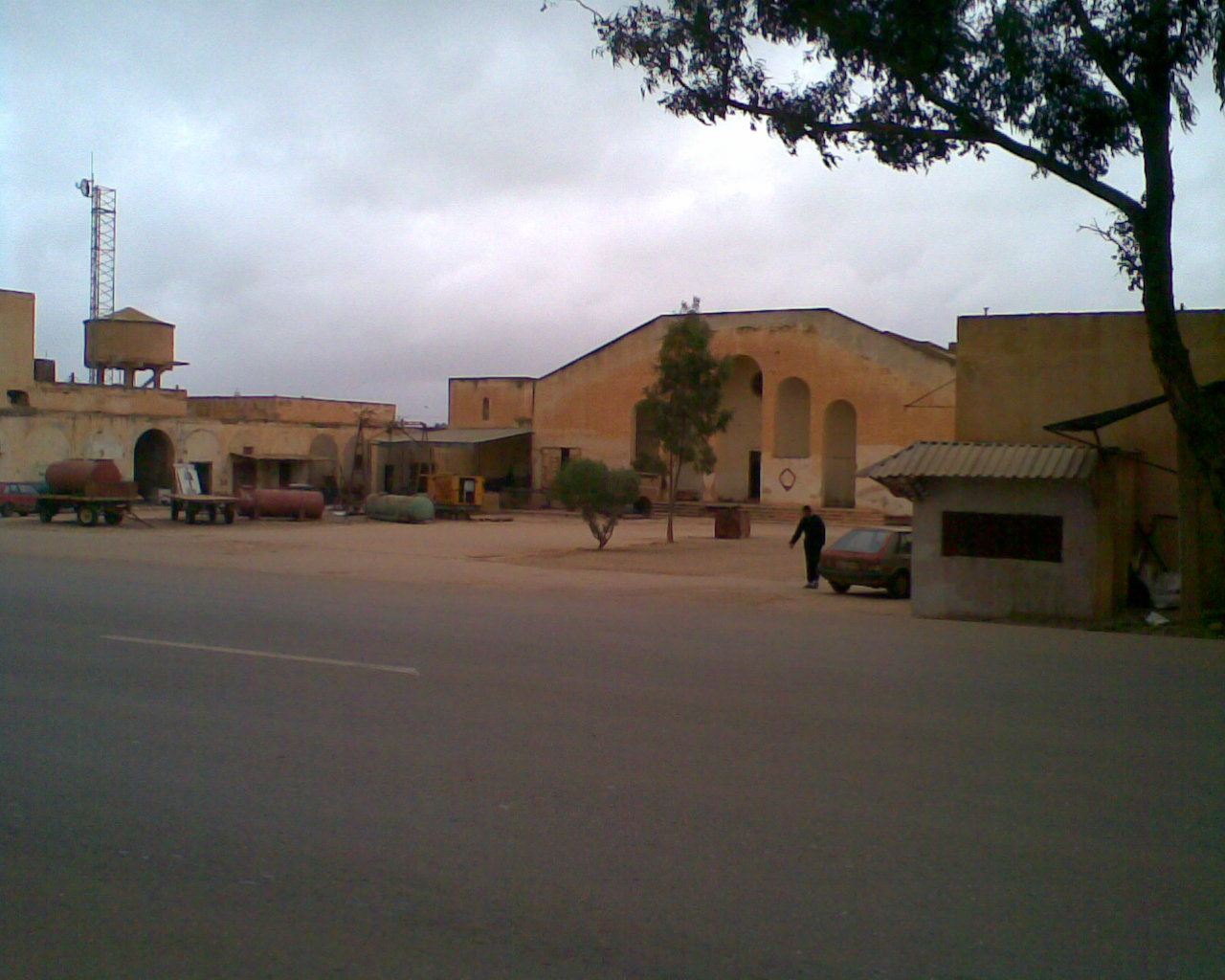
