= Soluch concentration camp =

Italian concentration camp in Libya

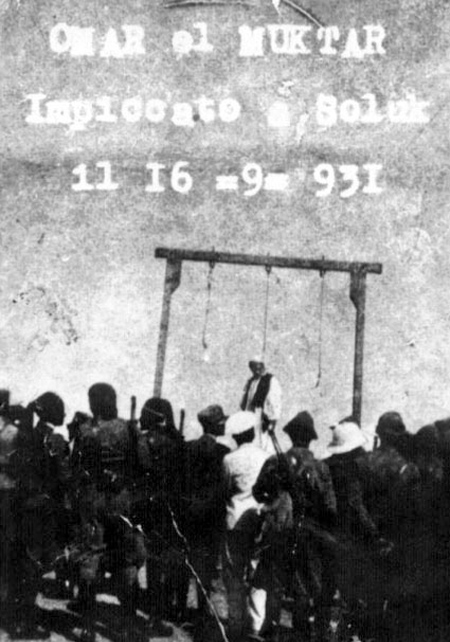
Execution of Omar Mukhtar, Soluch 1931

The Soluch concentration camp was an Italian concentration camp in Suluq (also known as Soluch) in the Italian colony of Libya during the Pacification of Libya that took place from 1928 to 1932. It was here that the Senussi anti-colonial leader Omar Mukhtar was executed by hanging on 16 September 1931. The camp is recorded as having a population of 20,123 people.

== See also ==
- Libyan genocide
- The Holocaust in Libya
- Italian concentration camps in Libya
- Italian Libya
- Second Italo-Senussi War
