= Omar al-Mukhtar =

Libyan resistance leader (1858–1931)

- عُمَر الْمُخْتَار
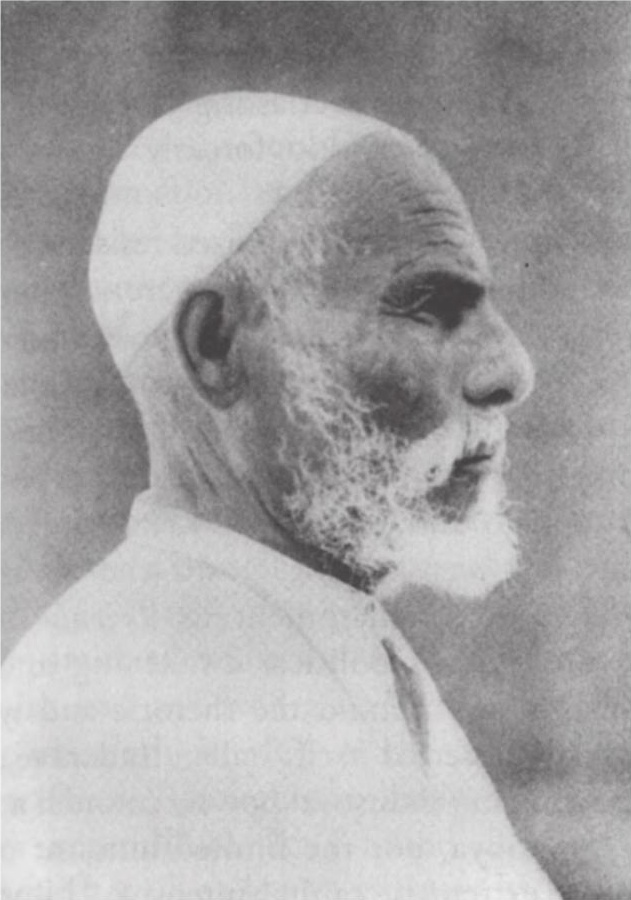

Ruler of Zawiyat Ayn Kalk
- In office 1896–1902
- Succeeded by: Post abolished

Ruler of Zawiyat Luqsur
- In office 1902–1911
- Succeeded by: Post abolished

Leader of Senussi Tribal Military
- In office 24 April 1923 – 16 September 1931
- Preceded by: Idris Al-Senussi
- Succeeded by: Yusuf Borahil

Personal details
- Born: 20 August 1858 Benghazi, Eyalet of Tripolitania, Ottoman Empire
- Died: 16 September 1931 (aged 73) Soluch concentration camp, Benghazi, Italian Cyrenaica
- Resting place: Suluq
- Children: Muhammad
- Parent(s): Al-Mukhtar ibn Muhammad (father); Aisha bint Muharib (mother)
- Occupation: Ruler of Senussi Zawiyas
- Known for: Leading Arab native resistance to Italian colonization of Ottoman Tripolitania
- Religion: Sunni Islam
- Nicknames: Shaykh ash-Shuhadā' شَيخ الشُّهَدَاء, Sheikh of the Martyrs; Assad as-Saharā' أسد الصحراء, Lion of the Desert

Military service
- Allegiance: Senussi Order
- Branch/service: Senussid Military Adwar
- Years of service: 1896–1902, as ruler of Ayn Kalk in Western Sudan (Chad); 1902–1923, as ruler of Zawiyat Laqsur in Cyrenaica; 1923–1931, as Commander of all Senussid Military Adwar
- Battles/wars: Italo-Turkish War; First World War; Senussi campaign; Pacification of Libya (executed)

ʿUmar al-Mukhtār Muḥammad bin Farḥāt al-Manifī (Arabic: عُمَر الْمُخْتَار مُحَمَّد بِن فَرْحَات الْمَنِفِي; 20 August 1858 – 16 September 1931), called The Lion of the Desert, known among the colonial Italians as Matari of the Mnifa, was a Libyan revolutionary and Imam who led the native resistance in Cyrenaica (currently Eastern Libya) under the Senussids, against the Italian colonization of Libya. A teacher-turned-general, Omar was a prominent figure of the Senussi movement and is considered the national hero of Libya and a symbol of resistance in the Arab and Islamic worlds. Beginning in 1911, he organised and led the Libyan resistance movement against the Italian colonial empire during the First and Second Italo-Senussi Wars. Externally, he also participated in armed opposition against the French in Chad and the British in Egypt. After many attempts, the Italian Armed Forces managed to capture Al-Mukhtar near Slonta when he was wounded in battle by Libyan colonial troops, and hanged him in 1931 after he refused to surrender.

== Early life ==
Omar Al-Mukhtar was born in 1858 in the town of Zanzur near Tobruk, in the region of Ottoman Cyrenaica to the Arab Mnifa tribe, belonging to the Senussi (who were seen as Libyan Ashrafs clan just like Emir or King Idris es Senussi), before eventually becoming chief or leader of the clan. As a child, Omar lost his father early on and spent his youth in poverty. He was adopted by a sheikh, and was friends with the nephew of Hussein Ghariani, Sharif al Geriani. His uncle was a political-religious leader in Cyrenaica, and he received his early education at the local mosque, before continuing his studies for eight years at the Senussi University in Jaghbub, the holy city of the Senussi Tariqa. He became a popular expert on the Quran and an imam, joining the confraternity of the Senussi. He also came to be well informed of the social structure of his society, as he was chosen to settle intertribal disputes.

Mukhtar developed a strong relationship with the Senussid Movement during his years in Jaghbub and in 1895, Al-Mahdi Senoussi traveled with him south to Kufra, and on another occasion further south to Karo in Chad, where he was appointed as sheikh of Zawiyat Ayn Kalk. When the French Empire encroached on Chad in 1899, he was sent among other Senussites to help defend Chad from the French, as the Senussi considered their expansion dangerous due to their missionary activities in Central and West Africa. In 1902, Omar was recalled north after the death of Al-Mahdi, the new Senussi leader Ahmed Sharif as-Senussi appointed him as Sheikh of the troubled Zawiyat Laqsur in Northern Cyrenaica.

== Italian invasion ==
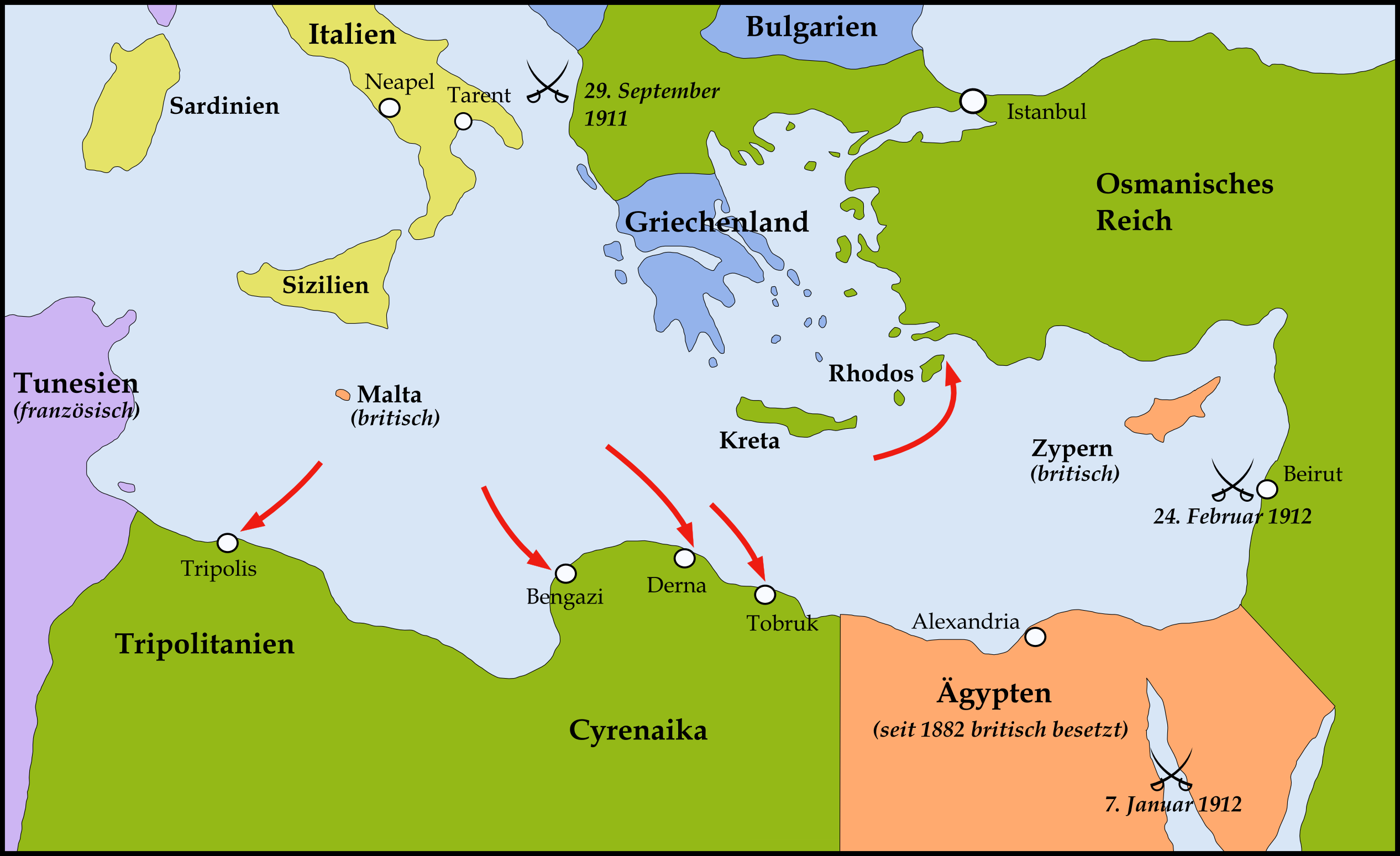
The Italian invasion.

In October 1911, during the Italo-Turkish War, the Regia Marina (Italian Royal Navy) under the command of Admiral Luigi Faravelli reached the shores of Libya, then a territory subject to Ottoman control. The admiral demanded that the Ottoman administration and garrison surrender their territory to the Italians or incur the immediate destruction of the city of Tripoli and Benghazi. The Ottomans and their Libyan allies withdrew to the countryside instead of surrendering, and the Italians bombarded the cities for three days, and then proclaimed the Tripolitanians to be 'committed and strongly bound to Italy'. This marked the beginning of a series of battles between the Italian colonial forces and the Libyan armed opposition in Cyrenaica.

== Guerrilla warfare ==
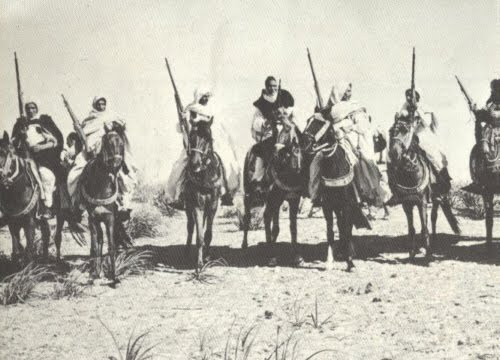
Omar Mukhtar photographed with Libyan Senussi fighters.

A teacher of the Qur'an by profession, Mukhtar was also skilled in the strategies and tactics of desert warfare. He knew local geography well and used that knowledge to advantage in battles against the Italians, who were unaccustomed to desert warfare. Mukhtar repeatedly led his small, highly alert groups in successful attacks against the Italians, after which they would fade back into the desert terrain. Mukhtar’s men skilfully attacked outposts, ambushed troops, and cut lines of supply and communication. The Regio Esercito (Italian Royal Army) was left astonished by his guerrilla tactics.

In the mountainous region of Jebel Akhdar ("Green Mountain") in 1924, Italian governor Ernesto Bombelli created a counter-guerrilla force that inflicted a severe setback to guerilla forces in April 1925. Mukhtar then quickly modified his own tactics and was able to count on continued help from Egypt. In March 1927, despite the occupation of Giarabub from February 1926 and increasingly stringent rule under Governor Attilio Teruzzi, Mukhtar surprised Italian troops at Raheiba. In 1927 and 1928, Mukhtar reorganised the Senusite forces, who were being hunted constantly by the Italians. Marshal Pietro Badoglio, Governor of Libya from January 1929, after extensive negotiations, concluded a compromise with Mukhtar (described by the Italians as his complete submission) similar to previous Italo-Senusite accords. At the end of October 1929, Mukhtar denounced the compromise and re-established a unity of action among Libyan forces, preparing himself for the ultimate confrontation with General Rodolfo Graziani, the Italian military commander from March 1930. A massive offensive in June against Mukhtar's forces having failed, Graziani, in full accord with Badoglio, Emilio De Bono (Minister of the Colonies), and Benito Mussolini, initiated a plan to break the Libyan Mujāhideen: the 100,000 people of Jebel Akhdar would be relocated to concentration camps on the coast, and the Libyan-Egyptian border from the coast at Giarabub would be fence-closed, preventing any foreign help to the fighters and depriving them of support from the native population. These measures, which Graziani initiated early in 1931, took their toll on the Senusite resistance. The rebels were deprived of help and reinforcements, spied upon, hit by Italian aircraft, and pursued on the ground by the Italian forces aided by local informers and collaborators.

Mukhtar's final adversary, Italian General Rodolfo Graziani, has given a description of the Senusite leader that is not lacking in respect: "Of medium height, stout, with white hair, beard, and mustache. Omar was endowed with a quick and lively intelligence; was knowledgeable in religious matters, and revealed an energetic and impetuous character, unselfish and uncompromising; ultimately, he remained very religious and poor, even though he had been one of the most important Senusist figures."

Mukhtar maintained good relations with the Braasa and Dorsa tribes, who had joined the rebellion, while he reacted with the raiding of animals and intimidation against the tribes who had submitted to the Italians. On November 29, 1927, near Slonta, he attacked a Braasa tribe camp, who also had submitted, invading it with 250 horsemen and also attacking on women and children.

== Capture and execution ==
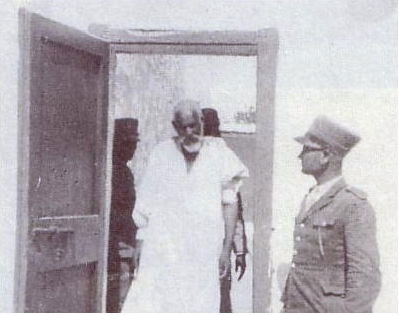
Omar Mukhtar entering the court room.

Mukhtar's struggle of nearly twenty years came to an end on 11 September 1931, when he was wounded in battle near Slonta, and then captured by Libyan Savaris of the Italian Army. On 16 September 1931, on the orders of the Italian court and with Italian hopes that Libyan resistance would die with him, Mukhtar was hanged before his followers in Soluch concentration camp at the age of 73 with his final words being “To Allah do we belong and to him shall we return”.

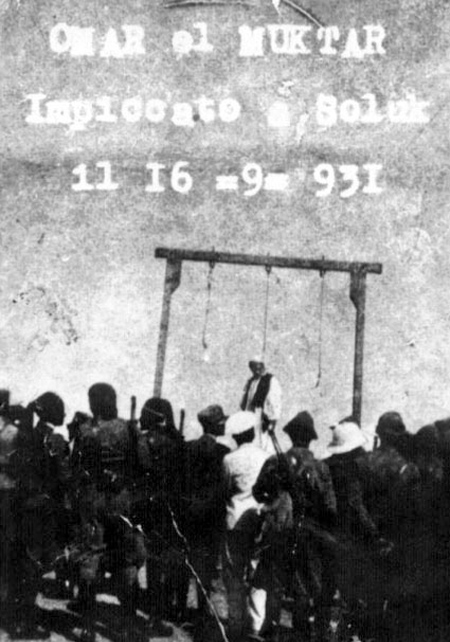
Execution of Omar Mukhtar, Soluch 1931

== Legacy ==
- Omar Al-Mukhtar University was founded in 1961.
- Since 1971, Mukhtar's face has appeared on the Libyan ten-dinar note.
- His final years were depicted in the movie Lion of the Desert (1981), starring Anthony Quinn, Oliver Reed, and Irene Papas. It was based on the struggles of Mukhtar against Rodolfo Graziani's forces.
- In 2009, Libyan leader Muammar Gaddafi wore a photograph of Mukhtar in Italian captivity on his chest while on a state visit to Rome, and brought along Mukhtar's elderly son during the visit.
- With the Libyan Civil War beginning on 17 February 2011, Omar Mukhtar again became a symbol for a united, free Libya and his picture was depicted on various flags and posters of the anti-Gaddafist forces. Rebel militias named one of their brigades the "Omar Mukhtar brigade" after him.
- A school is named after Mukhtar in Irbid, Jordan
- A masjid is named after Mukhtar in Tampa, Florida, USA, known as Masjid Omar Al Mokhtar.
- Streets are named after Mukhtar in:
  - Kuwait City, Kuwait (Omar Al-Mukhtar street)
  - Gaza City (Omar Mukhtar Street)
  - Cairo, Egypt (Omar Al Mukhtar Street)
  - West Bay area of Doha, Qatar (Omar Al Mukhtar Street)
  - Bizerte, Tunisia
  - Riyadh, Saudi Arabia (Omar Al Mukhtar Road)
  - Irbid, Jordan
  - Tangier, Morocco (Avenue Omar Mokhtar)
  - Pendik, Istanbul, Türkiye
- He is portrayed by Uğur Pektaş in the series Mahsusa: Trablusgarb which has been broadcast in Turkey since 2023.

== Gallery ==
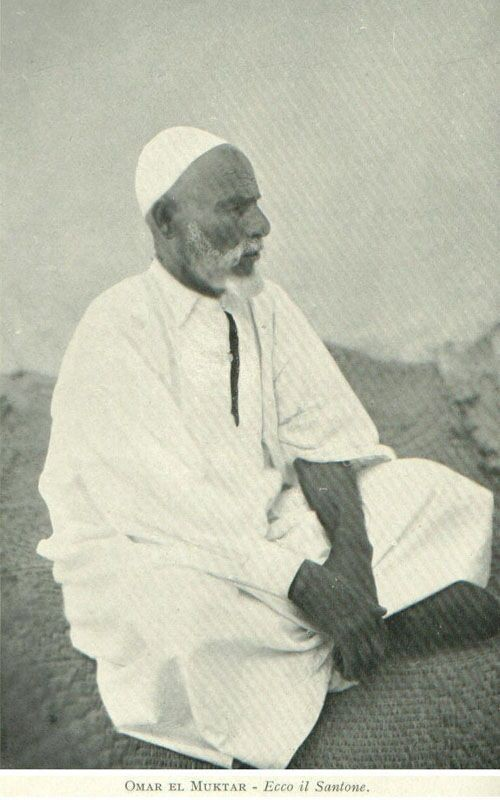
Photo of Omar Mukhtar sitting

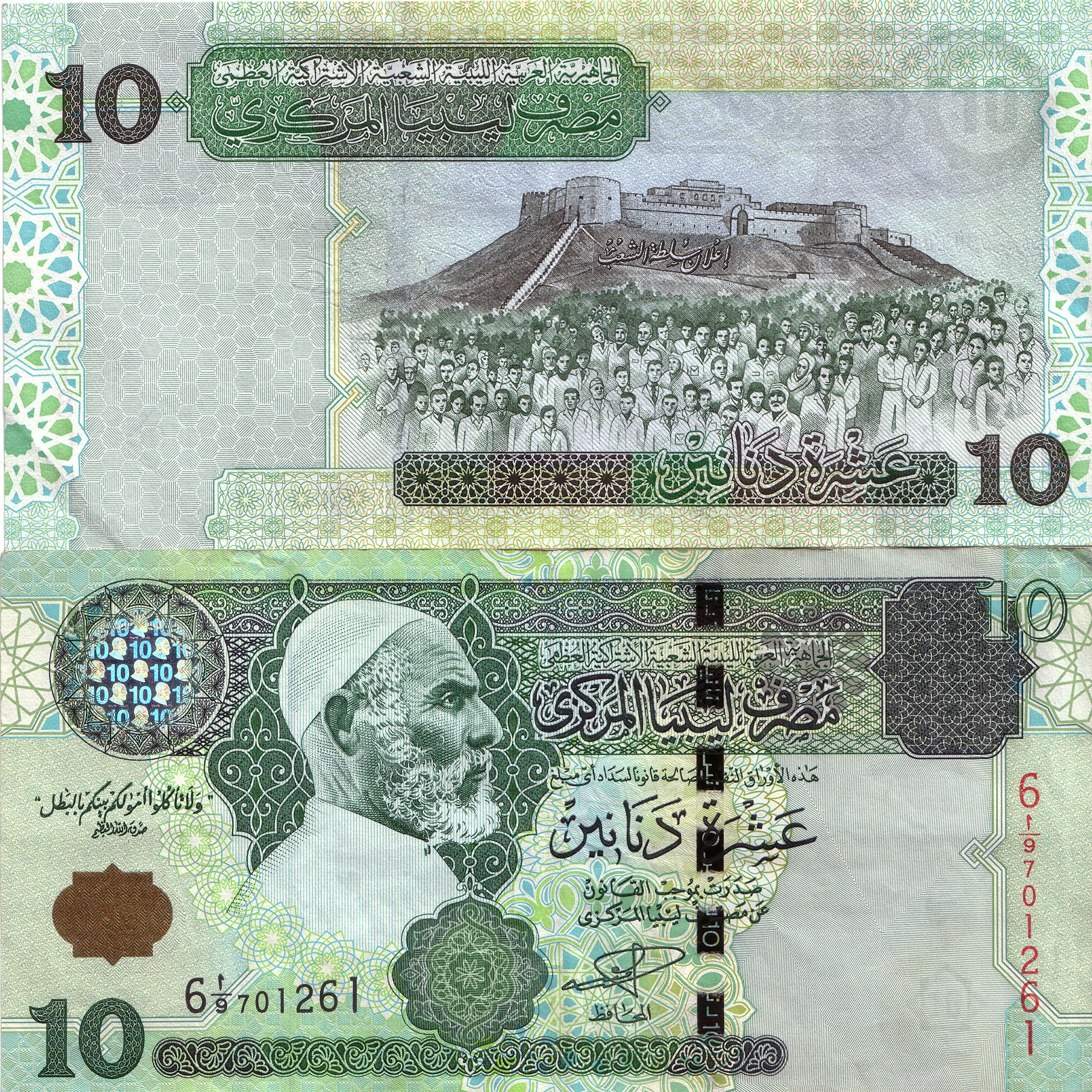
Omar Mukhtar's image on 10 Dinar note (2004)

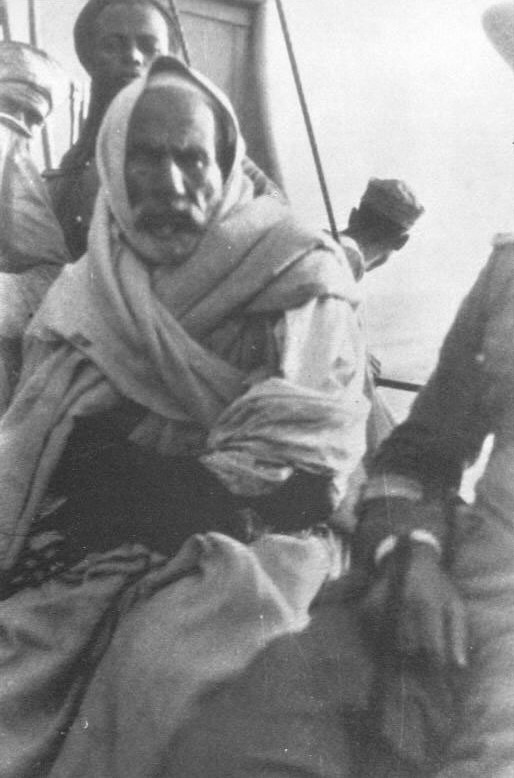
Omar Mukhtar while in custody.

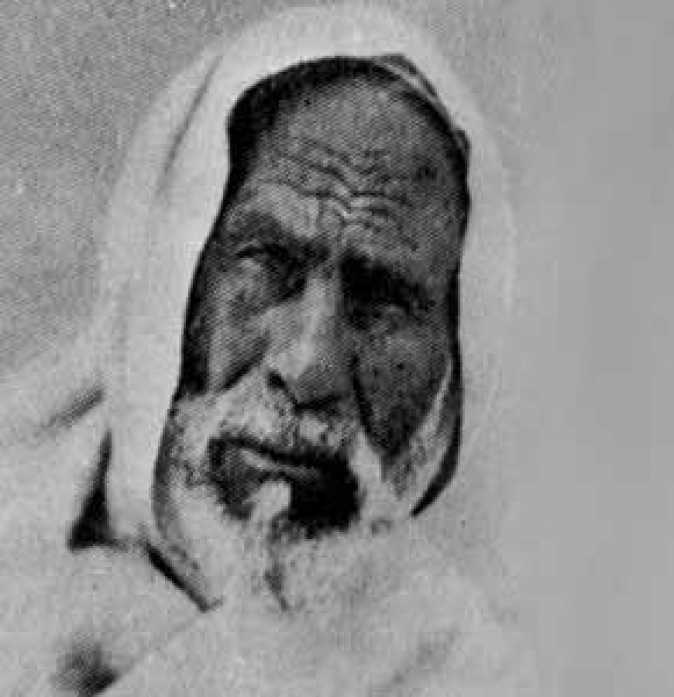
Close up of Omar Mukhtar

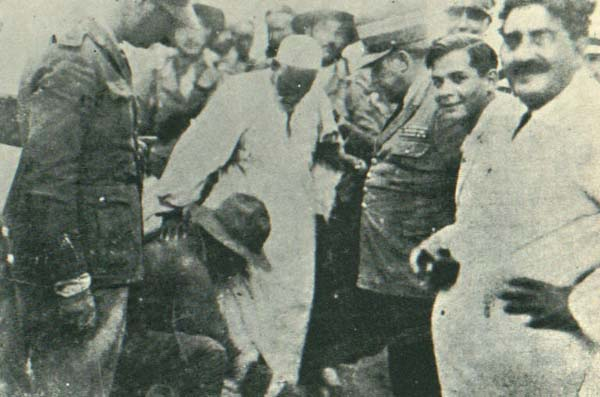
Omar Mukhtar in custody

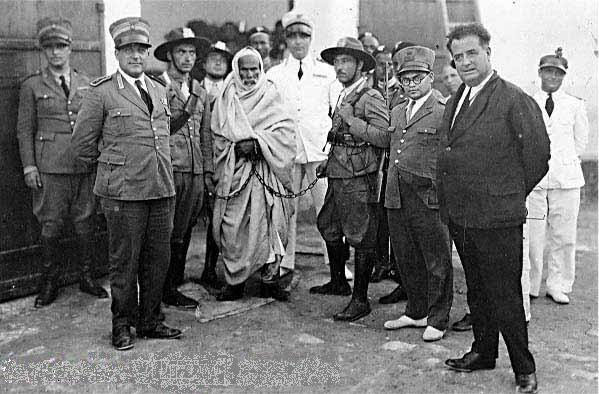
Omar Mukhtar arrested by Italian officials

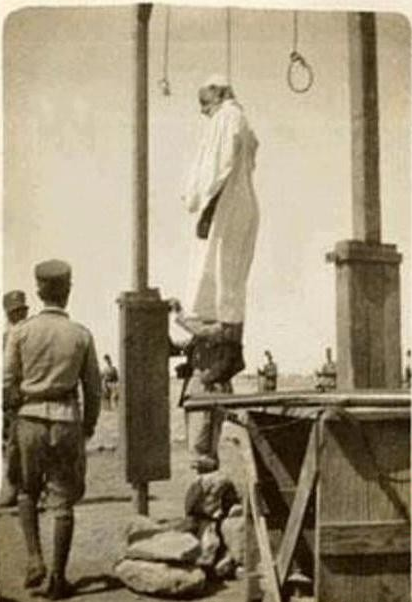
Mukhtar's execution by hanging

== See also ==
- Omar the North African lion
- Senussi
- We Will Not Surrender (We Win or We Die), protest song during the 2011 Libyan Civil War based on one of Mukhtar's speeches.
