= Italian invasion of Libya =

1911 Italian annexation of Ottoman Libya; beginning of the Italo-Turkish War

- Part of the Italo-Turkish War
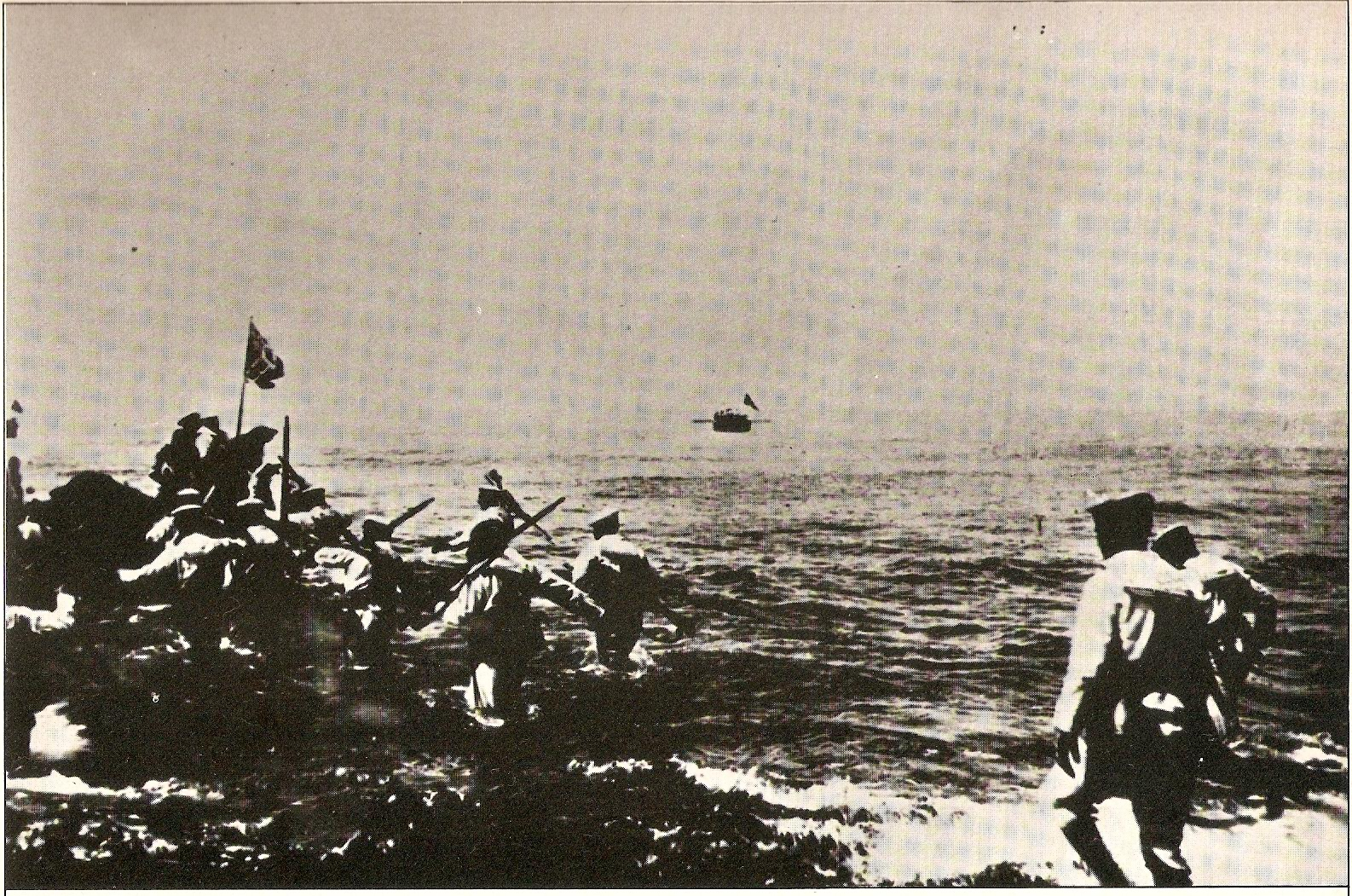
- Landing of Italian marines at Tripoli
Date	September 29, 1911 – October 18, 1912
Location	Libya
Result	Italian victory
Territorial changes	Italian annexation of Libya

Belligerents
Kingdom of Italy	Ottoman Empire; Senussi Order

Commanders and leaders
(Kingdom of Italy) Carlo Caneva	(Ottoman Empire) Mehmed V (Ottoman Empire) İsmail Enver (Ottoman Empire) Mustafa Kemal; Ahmed Sharif as-Senussi

Casualties and losses
1,430 killed 4,220 wounded	10,000+ casualties

The Italian invasion of Libya occurred in 1911, when Italian troops invaded the Ottoman province of Libya (then part of the Ottoman Empire) and started the Italo-Turkish War. As result, Italian Tripolitania and Italian Cyrenaica were established, later unified to form the colony of Italian Libya.

== Background ==
The claims of Italy over Libya dated back to verbal discussions after the Congress of Berlin (1878), in which France and Great Britain had agreed for the occupation of Tunisia and Cyprus respectively, both part of the then-ailing Ottoman Empire. When Italian diplomats hinted about a possible opposition of their government, the French replied that Tripoli would have been a counterpart for Italy. In 1902, Italy and France had signed a secret treaty which accorded freedom of intervention in Tripolitania and Morocco. However, the Italian government did little to put in practice the opportunity, and knowledge of the Libyan territory and resources remained scarce in the following years.

Italian politicians began expressing their own interests in an invasion of the territory as early as 1908 and subsequently the Italian press began a massive lobbying campaign in favour of an invasion of Libya towards the end of March 1911. It was fancifully depicted as rich of minerals, full of water, and defended by only 4,000 Ottoman troops. Also the population was considered hostile to the Ottoman Empire and friendly to the Italians. The future invasion was described as little more than a "military walk".

The Italian government was initially hesitant, but in the summer the preparations for the invasion were finally carried out, and Prime Minister Giovanni Giolitti began to probe the other European major powers about their reactions of a possible invasion of Libya. The Socialist party had strong influence over the public opinion. However, it was in opposition and also divided on the issue. It acted ineffectively against the military intervention.

An ultimatum was presented to the Ottoman government of CUP, in the night of 26–27 September. The CUP, through the Austrian intermediation, replied with the proposal of handing over control over Libya without warring, maintaining a merely formal Ottoman suzerainty. This suggestion was comparable to the situation in Egypt, which was under formal Ottoman suzerainty but was actually controlled by the United Kingdom. Giolitti refused, and war was declared on 29 September 1911.

== Military actions ==
In spite of the time it had had to prepare the invasion, the Italian Army was only partially prepared when the war broke out, mainly because of some opposition to the war in Italy (including from Benito Mussolini, then a socialist).

Italy's Military Plans and the Ottoman Lack of Response: The initial plans laid by the Italian General Staff called for an invasion force composed of

- 34,000 troops
- 6,300 horses and cavalry
- 1,050 troop carriers
- 48 artillery pieces
- 34 mountain artillery pieces

These initial plans were amended to increase Italian troop strength to 100,000 and include biplanes in the invasion force. Facing this force were 4,800 Ottoman regulars with a mixture of antiquated guns, rifles and artillery. The defense of Libya would be hastily prepared and fall on the shoulders of the indigenous population with a few hundred Ottoman officers providing leadership and guidance from 1911.

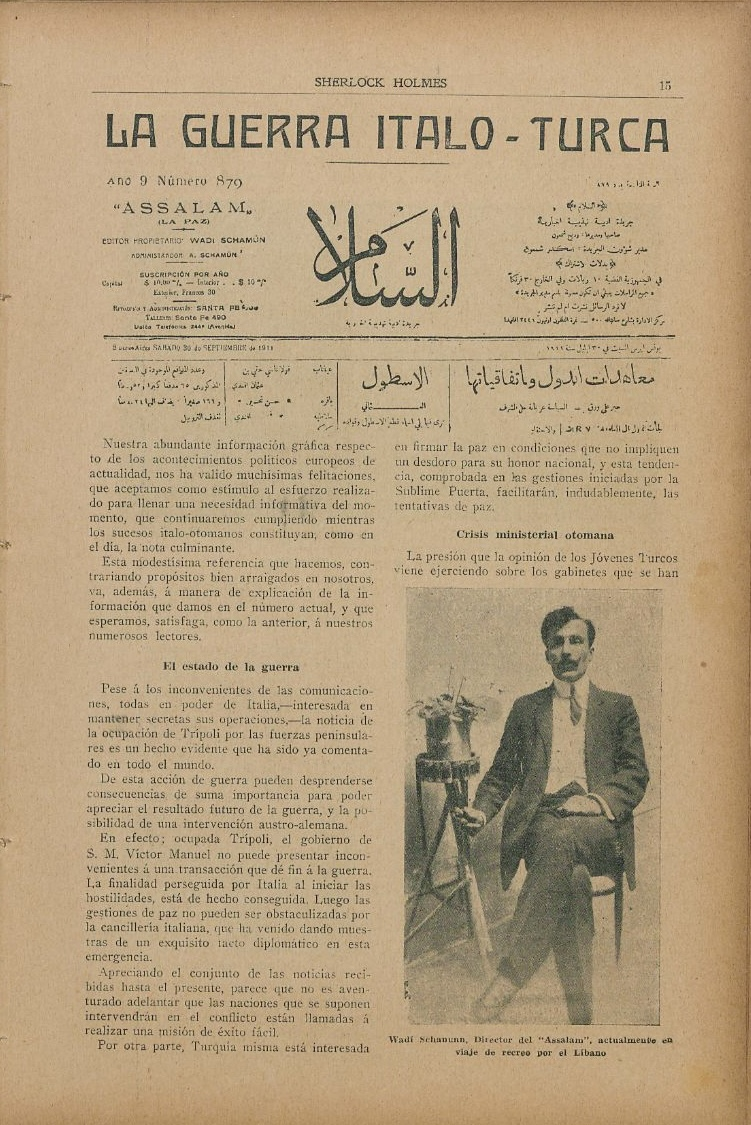
Argentine newspaper Assalam discussing the occupation of Tripoli.

Between 1911 and 1912, over 1,000 Somalis from Mogadishu, the then capital of Italian Somaliland, served as combat units along with Eritrean and Italian soldiers in the Italo-Turkish War. Most of the troops stationed never returned home until they were transferred back to Italian Somaliland in preparation for the invasion of Ethiopia in 1935, which later formed along with Italian Eritrea from Asmara and established itself as the Italian East Africa (Africa Orientale Italiana or AOI) on 9 May 1936 with Addis Ababa as the capital of the Italian African Empire. The Italian fleet had appeared off Tripoli in the evening of 28 September, but started to bomb the port only on 3 October. The city was conquered by 1,500 sailors, much to the enthusiasm of the interventionist minority in Italy. Another last proposal of a friendly settlement was rejected by the Italians, and the Turks determined therefore to defend the province until the last bullet but with a guerrilla war.

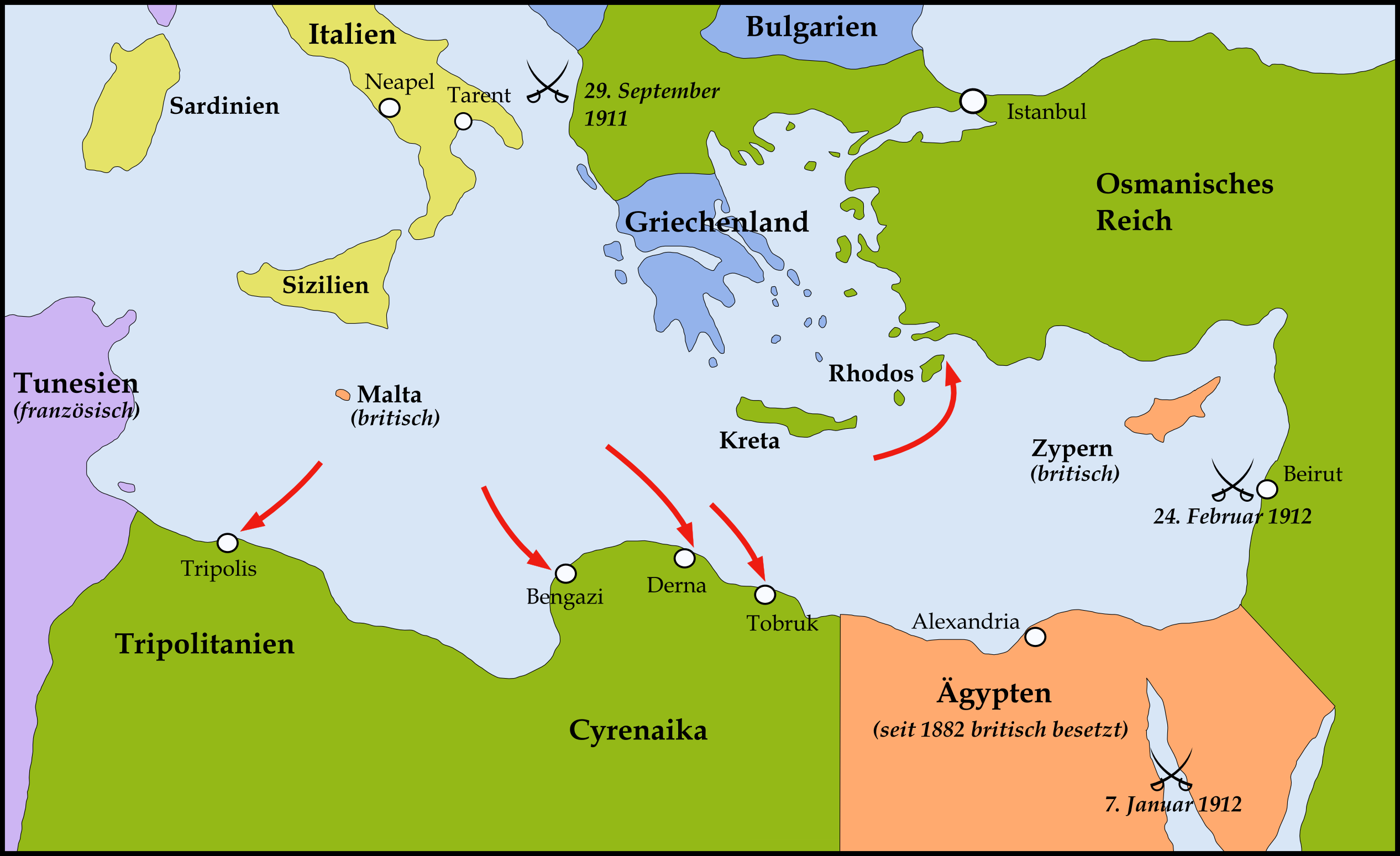
Italian landings in Libya

The first disembarkment of troops happened on 10 October, under the command of general Carlo Caneva, and soon Tripoli, Benghazi, Derna and Tobruk were occupied. The Italian contingent of 20,000 troops was deemed sufficient to the accomplishment of the conquest at the time. Tobruk, Derna and Al-Khums were easily conquered, but the same was not the case for Benghazi.

The city of Tripoli and surroundings, after a destructive bombing of the Turkish fortifications, were quickly conquered by 1,500 Italian sailors. They were welcomed by the population who started to collaborate (mainly the Jewish locals) with the Italian authorities.

The first partial setback for the Italian troops happened on 23 October in the Sciara Sciat massacre, when the bad placement of the Italian troops near Tripoli led to their almost complete encirclement by more mobile Arab cavalry, backed by some Turkish regular units. However, the Italians were able to defeat the Turkish and Libyan forces in a few hours.

The attack was portrayed as a simple "revolt" by the Italian press, but almost resulted in the annihilation of much of the Italian expeditionary corps. Consequently, it was increasingly enlarged until it amounted to 100,000 men, who had to face 20,000 Libyans and 8,000 Turks. It became a war of position, and even the first use of aviation in a modern war by the Italians had little effect.

Italian soldiers viewing corpses of dead Libyan and Turk defenders

On November 2 there was a tentative counterattack by the Ottoman forces in the small battle at Tobruk, but even here the city remained under Italian occupation.

Meanwhile, 1,500 Libyan volunteers attacked Italian troops who were building trenches near recently occupied Derna. The Italians, who were outnumbered but had superior weaponry, held the line. A lack of coordination between the Italian units sent from Derna as reinforcements and the intervention of Turkish artillery threatened the Italian line, and the Arabs attempted to surround the Italian troops. However, further Italian reinforcements were able to stabilize the situation, and the battle ended in the afternoon with an Italian victory. Then the Italian command sent three columns of infantry to disband the Arab Turkish camp near Derna. The Italian troops occupied a plateau, interrupting Turkish supply lines. Three days later, the Turkish commander, Enver Bey, attacked the Italian positions on the plateau. The larger Italian fire drove back the Turkish soldiers, who were surrounded by a battalion of Alpini and suffered heavy losses. A later Turkish attack had the same outcome.

Although many elements of the local Arab population collaborated with the Italians, counterattacks by Turkish soldiers with the help of some local troops (who declared jihad against the Christian invaders) confined the Italian army to the coastal region from the beginning of the Italian invasion.

Foreign military attaches observing the conflict were struck by General Caneva’s decision not to employ cavalry, despite the terrain and circumstances being well suited to its use, and by his failure to request reinforcements promptly despite the limited size of his force.

On 15 October 1911, nine Italian "Specialist Battalion" aeroplanes and 11 pilots landed in Libya. On 24 October, the Italian pilot Captain Riccardo Moizo carried out a reconnaissance flight in Tripolitania, reportedly the first ever strategic reconnaissance by aeroplane. On 1 November, another Italian pilot, Giulio Gavotti, dropped four 1.5 kg bombs on Ain Zara, pulling the pins with his teeth. This was the first aerial bombing in history.

With a decree on 5 November 1911, Italy declared its suzerainty over all Ottoman Libya, although it fully controlled only some coastal stretches.

== Armistice ==
Meanwhile, Italy maintained total naval supremacy, and could extend its control to almost all of the 2,000 km of the Libyan coast between January and early August 1912. To unblock the situation, Italy began operations against the Turkish possessions in the Aegean Sea, after having received approval from the other powers, which were eager to end a war that was lasting much longer than had been foreseen. Italy occupied 12 islands in that sea, the Dodecanese, but this raised the ire of the Austro-Hungarian Empire, who feared that this could fuel the irredentism of nations such as Serbia and Greece, causing unbalance in the already fragile situation in the Balkans.

The final major military operation that took place during the summer of 1912 was an attack carried out by five Italian torpedo boats in the Dardanelles, on 18 July. In September, Bulgaria, Serbia, and Greece prepared their armies for the war against the Ottoman Empire, taking advantage of its difficulties in the war against Italy. On 8 October, Montenegro declared war on the Turks, starting the Balkan Wars.

Italy then sought a favourable armistice agreement to conclude the conflict. The treaty was signed at Lausanne at 16:45 on 18 October 1912. The terms were formally equal to those requested by Istanbul at the beginning of the war, and maintained a formal Ottoman suzerainty over Libya, which received only an autonomous status under the judiciary rule of a "Cadis" elected by the Sultan.

== Aftermath ==
The invasion of Libya was a costly enterprise for Italy. Instead of the 30 million liras a month judged sufficient at its beginning, it reached a cost of 80 million a month, and for a far longer period than the original estimate. This caused economic imbalance at home. From the political point, the creation of Italian Libya showed (to observers like Benito Mussolini) that the lobbying power of an active and strong minority could have a great power in the country, as the advent of fascism would show after World War I.

As for Libya itself, the Italian control over much of its territory remained very ineffective until the late 1920s, when forces under Generals Badoglio and Graziani waged punitive pacification campaigns which turned into terrible acts of repression. Resistance petered out only after the execution of rebel leader Omar Mukhtar on 15 September 1931.

Successively, Libya was fully controlled by the Italians and integrated into Italian Libya and into Italy's Fourth Shore until World War II.

== See also ==
- History of the Ottoman Empire
- Italian rule in Libya
- Great Socialist People's Libyan Arab Jamahiriya

== Bibliography ==
- De Martino, Antonio. Tripoli italiana, la guerra italo-turca Library of Congress. Publisher: Societa' Libraria Italiana. New York, 1911
- Maltese, Paolo. "L'impresa di Libia", in Storia Illustrata No. 167, October 1971
- Romano, Sergio. La Quarta sponda. La guerra di Libia, 1911/1912, Casa Editrice Bompiani. Milano, 1977
- P. Hallion, Richard. Strike From the Sky: The History of Battlefield Air Attack, 1910–1945. (second edition) University of Alabama Press, 2010. ISBN 0817356576, 9780817356576.
- Vandervort, Bruce. Verso la quarta sponda la guerra italiana per la Libia (1911–1912). Stato maggiore dell'esercito. Roma, 2012.
