= Savari =

Libyan troops of colonial Italy

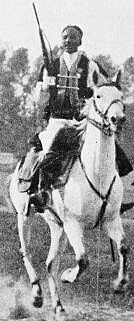
Savari of the Italian colonial cavalry performing in Rome, 1926

Savari was the designation given to the regular native Libyan cavalry regiments of the Italian colonial army from 1912 to 1943, in Italian Tripolitania and Italian Cyrenaica, and later in Italian Libya. The word "savari" was derived from a Persian term for "horsemen" (Savārān).

== Organisation ==
This cavalry force was recruited from the Arab-Berber population of what is now Libya, following the Italian occupation in 1911-12. The first Savari units were raised in December 1912, drawn from tribal irregulars or bande recruited by the Italians shortly after their occupation of Tripoli in October 1911.

The officers of the fourteen squadrons (twelve designated as "regular line" and two as "command") comprising this corps were nearly all Italian. Their troopers and some of the non-commissioned officers were Berber and Arab volunteers, who had a long tradition of horsemanship.

Seven line squadrons were recruited from Tripolitania and five from Cyrenica during the 1920s and 1930s. In 1929-30 the Tripolitanian units were reduced to two squadrons while in 1935 the entire corps of Libyan savari was reorganised as a single Gruppo Squadroni totaling four squadrons.

== History ==
The Savari formed part of the Regio Corpo Truppe Coloniali della Libia (Royal Corps of Libyan Colonial Troops or RCTL), which included desert and camel troops, infantry battalions, artillery and irregular cavalry (called "Spahis").

The Truppe Coloniali saw extensive service during the Italian conquest of Cyrenaica, which was not completed until 1932. Rebel leader Omar Al Mukhtar was captured by a Libyan Savari of the Italian colonial troops in 1931.

In 1936 Savari and other Libyan units took part in the Italian invasion of Ethiopia and received a "Gold Medal of Honor" for their performance in battle

== World War II ==
On the eve of Italy's entry into World War II the Royal Corps of Libyan Colonial Troops comprised approximately 28,000 locally recruited personnel. They suffered heavy losses during the Battle of the Marmarica (December 1940).

The RCTL was formally disbanded in January 1943 following the Italian withdrawal into Tunisia. Prior to this the role of the Savari and other mounted troops had been restricted to patrol and scouting work in the desert frontier regions of the Libyan interior, by the demands of modern mechanised warfare.

== Uniforms ==
Each squadron was distinguished by a distinctively coloured sash and farmula (sleeveless jacket) worn with white or khaki uniforms according to occasion. Sash and farmula colours were yellow, black, crimson, blue, green, red and orange, worn in various combinations according to the unit. Dark red "tachia" fezzes of traditional Libyan pattern were worn by all indigenous personnel over white skull caps.

== Savari commander ==
Amedeo Guillet was the commander of the VII°Savari Squadron in 1937. He was recognized for improving relations with the Libyan populace and charged with organising the equestrian part of the celebrations during which the ornamental “sword of Islam” was unsheathed by Benito Mussolini when visiting Libya in 1937.

== See also ==
- Italian Libya
- History of Libya as Italian colony
- Italian Spahis
- Meharist
- Dubats
- Zaptie

== Sources ==
- Le Uniformi Coloniali Libiche 1912 - 1942 – Priero Crocaini and Andrea Viotti.
- Inside Africa – John Gunther
- World Armies – John Keegan ISBN 0-333-17236-1
