= Libyan resistance movement =

1911–1917 and 1923–1932 resistance to Italian rule in Libya

Libyan resistance
- Leaders: Emir Idris of Cyrenaica; Omar Mukhtar; Yusuf Burahil; Fadil Bu Umar; Omar Shegewi
- Dates active: 1911–1918; 1923–1932; 1940–1943
- Country: Italian Tripolitania and Italian Cyrenaica (later Italian Libya), Egypt, Sudan

The Libyan resistance movement was the rebel force opposing the Italian Empire during its Pacification of Libya between 1923 and 1932.

== History ==
=== First years ===
The Libyan resistance, associated with the Senussi Order, was initially led by Omar Mukhtar (Arabic عمر المختار ‘Umar Al-Mukhtār, 1862–1931), who was from the tribe of Mnifa. The First Italo-Senussi War had two main active phases: the Italo-Turkish War (1911–12), when Italy invaded Libya, and the Senussi Campaign (1915–17), part of World War I, in which Italian and British forces fought the Ottoman and German-supported Senussi. The Libyans were eventually defeated. After a period of relative peace, the Second Italo-Senussi War broke out in 1923 and lasted until 1932.

=== Second Italo-Libyan War (1923–1932) ===
Later King Idris and his Senussi tribe in the provinces of Cyrenaica and Tripolitania started to become opposed to the Italian colonization after 1929, when Italy changed its political promises of moderate "protectorate" to the Senussi (done in 1911) and—because of Benito Mussolini—started to take complete colonial control of Libya. Hundreds of Libyans fought in the Italian colonial corps, including the Meharists and Savari troops.

The Libyans suffered between 40,000 and 70,000 deaths due to battles, deportation and starvation, while the Italian colonial troops lost 2,582 men. An estimated 100,000 to 250,000 indigenous Libyans also immigrated or went into exile during the period from the start of the Italo-Turkish war in 1911 to the end of Italian governance in 1943.

=== The Second World War ===
During exile, Idris of Libya and Tripolitanian nobles in Egypt established the Libyan Arab Force to fight alongside the Allies.

The Libyan Arab force would see extensive battles in the Western Desert campaign in battles such as the Second Battle of Al Alamayn and the Siege of Tobruk.

== Aftermath ==
Resistance was crushed by General Rodolfo Graziani in the 1930s and the country was again controlled by the Italians with the help of Libyan collaborators, to the point that many Libyan colonial troops fought on the side of Italy between 1940 and 1943. Two divisions of Libyan colonial troops were created in the late 1930s. 30,000 native Libyans fought for Italy during World War II.

== See also ==
- Gasr Bu Hadi
- Fourth Shore
- Italia irredenta
- Italian Mare Nostrum
- Resistance during World War II
