= Idris bin Abdullah al-Senussi =

Prince Idris al-Senussi
- Prince (Sayyid) of Libya
- Born: 1957 (age 68–69); Benghazi, Kingdom of Libya
- Spouse: Cindy Lea Heles (m. 1982; div. 1986) Doña Ana María Quiñones Fernández (m. 1987)
- Issue: Princess Alia al-Senussi; Prince Khaled al-Senussi
- House: Senussi
- Father: Sayyid Prince Abdullah al-Abid al-Senussi
- Mother: Princess Ghalia bint Nur Saleh

Idris bin Abdullah al-Senussi (Arabic: ادريس بن عبد الله السنوسي; born 1957) is a member of the family of Idris, Libya's former UN-appointed king, and claims to be the heir to the Libyan throne. The position of heir is also claimed by his cousin Prince Mohammed El Senussi, the son and designated heir of the last Libyan Crown Prince.

Idris has called for Libyans of all different factions and tribes to meet, discuss and mutually agree on the future and leadership of Libya, as he supports the unity of Libya. He has also been playing a diplomatic role to help balance the differences between Libya and Africa, the Arab World, Europe, the United States, Latin America and Asia.

He returned to Libya on 23 December 2011 with his cousin, Prince Ahmed Zubair Al-Senussi. He stated that he was not there to be active in politics or campaigning for the monarchy's restoration, but to work towards peace and unity in Libya.

His claim to leadership of the Senussi family was ruled out by a British court in 1995, but Senussi has continued to claim the title of Prince and advances a claim to the Libyan throne.

Idris has been described to by Debrett's Peerage as, "the second son of the sixth son of the second son of the younger brother of King Idris's father".

== Early life ==
Prince Idris al-Senussi was born in Benghazi, the third son of Prince (Sayyid) Abdullah al-Abid al-Senussi (1919–88, nephew of Ahmed Sharif as-Senussi, 3rd Grand Senussi) and his second wife Princess Ghalia bint Nur Saleh. His father's third wife was a daughter of Crown Prince Muhammad al-Rida, the brother of King Idris. Prince Idris was twelve years old when, on 1 September 1969, the monarchy in Libya was overthrown by Muammar Gaddafi.

At the time of the coup, Idris was at school in England with his brothers. They found out about the end of monarchy after a phone call from their father.

Idris attended the Brummana High School in Lebanon, and then St George's British International School, Rome. He later attended several private executive and leadership courses.

== Exile ==
=== The al-Senussi Family ===
Idris is supported by an Advisory Council (the Senussi royal family allows polygamy, which is "a factor that complicates all claims of royal legitimacy through descent") that heads the Sanussiyyah movement which embraces the majority of Libyan tribes.

The majority of Libyan monarchists, and the most prominent Libyan monarchist organizations– the Libyan Constitutional Union and the Movement for the Return of Constitutional Legitimacy– support the claim of Mohammed El Senussi, a distant cousin of Idris, to the leadership of the House of Senussi. On December 13, 2011, Prince Idris returned back to Libya after being exiled at Italy.

Muhammad ibn Ali as-Senussi
Muhammad as-Sharif as-Senussi
Muhammad al-Mahdi bin Muhammad as-Senussi
Ahmed as-Sharif as-Senussi	Muhammad al-Abid as-Senussi
Muhammad ar-Reda	King Idris I of Libya	Queen Fatimah as-Sharif	az-Zubayr bin Ahmad as-Sharif	Abdullah bin Muhammad al- Abid as-Senussi
Hasan as-Senussi	Ahmed as-Senussi (member of NTC)	Idris bin Abdullah as-Senussi (claimant)
Mohammed as-Senussi

=== Addressing Controversies in Libya ===
In 1991, the New York Times published an article stating that al-Senussi would take control of a 400-man strong dissident Libyan paramilitary force that had received training from American intelligence, to fight against injustice in Libya.

=== Leadership ===
In the early 1990s, Idris lobbied to convince the British government to recognize him as the legitimate heir to the King of Libya. Forty-one MPs signed a motion that described him as a "great nephew of the late King Idris of Libya and heir presumptive of the Libyan throne."

On July 5, 1995, the Sunday Times described Idris as a “Phoney Arab prince” who “spent at least £100,000 on parliamentary lobbying and public relations exercises to create a false image that he was rightful heir to the Libyan throne." This claim was taken to court in July 1995. Senussi admitted to hiring a firm to raise his profile “amongst decision-makers in the United Kingdom.

Asked to provide testimony in the case, Debretts’ repudiated his claim to the leadership of the house, calling Idris the “second son of the sixth son of the younger brother of King Idris's father.”

During the 2011 Libyan civil war, al-Senussi announced he was "ready to return to Libya". On 21 February 2011 he made an appearance on Piers Morgan Tonight to discuss the uprising. In March 2011 it was reported Prince Idris had held meetings at the State Department and Congress in Washington with US government officials to work towards peace and leadership issues in Libya. It was also reported attempts at contact had been initiated by French and Saudi officials over peace and leadership issues. In March 2011, when asked if he was the rightful heir, Prince Idris said a family council would decide who would be king, not an heir, and that his father had passed on to him the task of maintaining the legitimacy of the monarchy and the unity of Libya.

It was reported in December 2011 that Idris had flown to Tripoli from Italy and spent his first day looking around the former Royal Palace of Tripoli, which he described as "the greatest joy of my life, apart from the birth of my children".

In December 2011, Senussi flew back to Libya using a passport of royal vintage, In the same year, the Telegraph wrote that “The Senussi family tree shows that Idris is only distantly related to King Idris, the last monarch of Libya who died in 1983.

=== Business life ===
Prince Idris has served as a Director of Washington Investment Partners and China Sciences Conservational Power Ltd. He has also been involved in the railways development, port development, power plants, real estate projects and oil and gas industry, having in the past worked for Condotte, Ansaldo Energia, Eni and its subsidiary Snamprogetti. He was also the mediator and key adviser of the contract for the construction of the Port of Ras Laffan in Qatar.

Idris has structured, facilitated and raised financing for several infrastructure development projects.

== Marriages and issue ==
Idris has been married twice.

He first married Cindy Lea Heles (born 29 November 1956) on 30 January 1982. Together, they have one daughter before their divorce in 1986: Alia al-Senussi (born 20 February 1983).

He married his current wife, Spanish aristocrat Ana María Quiñones Fernández (born 1958) on 23 March 1987, now known as Princess Ana María al-Senussi. Together, they have one son: Khaled bin Sayyid Idris al-Senussi (born 23 February 1988), a defense, security and business advisory expert.
