= Movement for the Return of Constitutional Legitimacy – Libya =

The Movement for the Return of Constitutional Legitimacy in Libya (Arabic: حراك العودة للشرعية الدستورية) is a movement in Libya that advocates the reinstatement of the 1951 Constitution and the restoration of the historic Senussi monarchy.

Support for the 1951 Constitution emerged from the instability and chaos created by the Libyan Civil War, during which time the country grew divided across political, tribal, regional and ideological lines. The movement views the 1951 Constitution as the viable and credible path towards a democratic, unified, and independent new Libya. Furthermore, the movement holds that Prince Mohammed El Senussi should assume leadership as the legitimate heir to Senussi throne.

Affiliated grassroots campaigns termed as Movements for the Return of Constitutional Legitimacy are happening on the ground in major cities such as Tripoli, Benghazi, Zliten, Kufra, Misrata, Sebha, Jebel Akhdar, Khums, Nalut, Jadu, Sebratha, Aziziya, Ghyrian and Karabulli.

== 1951 Libya Constitution ==
The pre-revolutionary Constitution, instituted in December 1951 and later amended in 1963, was drafted by the Libyan National Assembly under the aegis of the United Nations. It established a constitutional and hereditary monarchy under the leadership of King Idris I of Libya.

The 1951 Constitution is viewed by the Libyan people as a symbol of the freedom and independence the country achieved in post-war Libya. It is based upon a democratic system of government with a representative parliamentary system under a constitutional monarchy. Many of the 1951 Constitution's articles established a set of fundamental rights for its citizens, including civil, political, and property rights, freedom of thought and speech, religious tolerance and universal adult suffrage.

Article 11 of the 1951 Constitution safeguards human rights:

“Libyans shall be equal before the law. They shall enjoy equal civil and political rights, shall have the same opportunities, and be subject to the same public duties and obligations, without distinction of religion, belief, race, language, wealth, kinship or political or social opinions.”

Additionally, Article 12 holds that “Personal liberty shall be guaranteed and everyone shall be entitled to equal protection of the law.” Article 21 protects rights with respect to religion:

“Freedom of conscience shall be absolute. The State shall respect all religions and faiths and shall ensure to foreigners residing in its territory freedom of conscience and the right freely to practice religion so long as it is not a breach of public order and is not contrary to morality.”

Freedom of speech and opinion both publicly and in the press are protected in Articles 22 – 26:

“Freedom of thought shall be guaranteed. Everyone shall have the right to express his opinion and to publish it by all means and methods. But this freedom may not be abused in any way which is contrary to public order and morality.”

“Freedom of press and of printing shall be guaranteed within the limits of the law.”

“Everyone shall be free to use any language in his private transactions or religious or cultural matters or in the Press or any other publications or in public meetings.”

“The right of peaceful meetings is guaranteed within the limits of law.”

== Senussi monarchy ==
In 1837, Muhammad ibn Ali as-Senussi established the Senussi political-religious tariqa (Sufi order) in Mecca. Muhammad ibn Ali as-Senussi's grandson, who assumed the leadership of the Senussi order in 1917, became Emir of Cyrenaica in 1920 and King Idris of Libya in 1951.

The Senussi monarchy played a unifying role in Libya and continues to be regarded as a fundamental part of the country's history, helping to protect it from French colonial expansion and the Kingdom of Italy's colonization in the early 1900s along with playing a crucial role against forces in North Africa during World War II.

The monarchy was in place from 1951 until Colonel Muammar Gaddafi's coup in 1969.

=== Heir to the Senussi throne ===
Libyan royalists view Prince Mohammed El Senussi, great-nephew of King Idris, as the legitimate heir to the Senussi throne. In 1992, El Senussi's ailing father, then Crown Prince Hasan as-Senussi, appointed him as successor to the throne.

Throughout the strife of the Libyan crisis, Mohammed El Senussi has vocalized his patriotism and advocated for a more prosperous Libya. He has commented on many Libyan matters through the years and has supported activists throughout the civil war.

Speaking out in 2011 against actions perpetrated by the Ghaddafi regime, El Senussi said: “I ask the international community to put pressure on Ghaddafi to stop killing his own people […] anything to stop the killing of my people, and to put pressure on Ghaddafi. It’s for them to decide.”

In response to questions about returning to power, El Senussi stated “I see myself as a servant to the Libyan people. They will decide what they want. My goal is to serve my people as much as I can.”

A cousin of El Senussi, Idris bin Abdullah al-Senussi, claims that he is the rightful heir to the throne, although this claim is speculative given that he seems to be only distantly related to King Idris.

== Support inside Libya ==
=== Leadership ===
Multiple authority figures throughout Libya have publicly championed a return of the 1951 Constitution under the leadership of Mohammed El Senussi.

In July 2015, multiple members of the Constitutional Drafting Authority (CDA), the body tasked with drafting a constitution, signed a petition demanding the return of the 1951 Constitution and monarchy, arguing this is the only solution to the crisis in Libya.

That same month, the Mayor of the large Libyan city of Al Baidha publicly released a formal letter proclaiming his support for the 1951 Constitution as a tool to ensure stability and security during a time when so many Libyan citizens were being killed.

In August 2015, the Federal Bloc asked the House of Representatives to endorse the 1951 Constitution “warning that if this demand is not answered it will delegate parliament members from Cyrenaica to reinstate the constitution within the region and to take the necessary action to achieve this.”

In a 2014 interview with Al-Hayat, Libyan Minister of Foreign Affairs, Mohamed Abdelaziz, proclaimed that he would “take it upon himself” to call for reinstatement of the monarchy, and furthermore that it was “his right as a citizen first and foremost, before being a minister.” He expressed his belief that a return to monarchy would be a “political umbrella” to unite the country:

“I am not talking about a king who rules, but about a symbolic figure like in Belgium, Britain and Spain. When we talk about royal legitimacy, we mean centrist values, the Senussi movement and the history and loyalty for late King Idris al-Senussi.”

=== Social media presence throughout cities ===
Groups across cities in Libya referring to themselves as Movements for the Return of Constitutional Legitimacy are well-documented and have gathered a significant following on social media.

The movement in Libya's capital city of Tripoli has gathered thousands of followers on its Facebook page. The movement regularly shares relevant events, articles, press releases, speeches, and other activity advocating for the return of the monarchy and 1951 Constitution.

Many social media pages with tens of thousands of followers have been made based on the movement. Jebel Akhdar’s movement has almost 7,000 active followers, and the movement active the city of Zliten has over 28,000 social media followers. The movement in Zliten recently posted:

“The nostalgia for the constitution of the state of independence is not nostalgia for the past, but nostalgia for a homeland that has been stolen.”

.

== International attention ==
The New York Times published an article in February 2016 suggesting that a restoration of the monarchy would “let Libyans rally behind a respected father figure and begin to rebuild their splintered nation.”

Daniel Kawczynski, a Foreign Affairs Select Committee member in the British Parliament, wrote a June 2015 article in the New Statesman stating “if the people of Libya succeed in restoring their 1951 Constitution, they would put in place a tolerant, rights-based, democratic system of government, with a constitutional monarchy that would be a model for the region.”

In July 2014, The National Interest published an article titled “The Case for Monarchy in Libya.” It described the varying tribal relations from among regions, which cause a splintered Libyan society, and asserts that the solution to unification “can be found in Libya’s past, before a twenty-seven-year-old Gaddafi launched his Green Revolution and turned the country’s political system to dust: constitutional monarchy.” It also mentions the “considerable influence” the Senussi family – King Idris specifically – had on commanding respect from the various tribes and strains of Islam.
