= The Movement for the Return of Constitutional Legitimacy - Tripoli =

Movement for the Return of Constitutional Legitimacy – Tripoli
- Location: Tripoli, Libya

The Movement for the Return of Constitutional Legitimacy - Tripoli is an active campaign in Libya’s capital and largest city, Tripoli, to reinstate the 1951 Constitution and the historic Senussi monarchy. Members of the movement view the 1951 Constitution as the only political solution to the Libyan Civil War that has persisted since 2011. The members of the movement advocate for the legitimate heir to the Senussi Crown Prince Mohammed El Senussi, son of Crown Prince Hasan as-Senussi and nephew of late King Idris, to lead Libya according to the provisions of the 1951 Constitution.

Tripoli’s Movement for the Return of Constitutional Legitimacy, which has been active for a number of years, is part of the nationwide Movement for the Return of Constitutional Legitimacy in Libya which is also active in Tobruk, Zliten, Jebel Akhdar and Misurata.

== Campaign for constitutional legitimacy ==
The members of the movement in Tripoli view the 1951 Constitution as the basis for establishing national sovereignty and returning stability to the Libyan homeland.

The movement in Tripoli has been active for several years and has had a social media presence on Facebook since early 2014. In 2014 it proclaimed:

"The movement for the return to constitutional legitimacy provides a vision aimed at stabilizing the political situation in the country, based on the return of constitutional legitimacy with the inherent right to establish the nation and unity, as approved by the founding fathers and grandfathers of the independent state of Libya […] with the return of constitutional legitimacy, a minimum level of consensus can be found between all the forces and components of the Libyan people. This enables them to formulate a charter that guarantees the safety and unity of the nation and guarantees the dignity and security of the citizen."

== Local events in support of the 1951 Constitution ==
The movement actively posts to its Facebook page on a weekly basis, including pertinent speeches, events and news coverage surrounding the 1951 constitution.

On January 25, 2017, it posted that the draft national constitutional entitlement "which represents a political solution to the Libyan crisis" would be announced on January 26.

In December 2016, the movement proclaimed:

"All Libyans must loudly claim to activate the Constitution of Independence and to invite the rightful heir […] and Crown Prince Hassan Mohammed Rida al-Mahdi al-Sanusi to receive full constitutional duties to save our country […] and save the country from division and stop the bleeding of the Libyan people."

On December 6, 2016, it shared a collection of photos from a peaceful march in the Algiers Square of Tripoli to demand the return to constitutional legitimacy and for Prince Mohammed El Senussi to "receive full constitutional powers as the king of Libya."

In February 2016, the movement said it had attended a four-hour-long meeting with the General National Congress of Libya to present the initiative to return to constitutional legitimacy.

In December 2014, the movement held a peaceful demonstration for the reestablishment of the 1951 Constitution and a conference at a hotel in El-Bayda, attended by politicians, businessmen, academics and tribal leaders in Barqa.

The same month, it shared photos from a meeting with the Mayor of Tripoli, Mr. Mahdi Abdul Hamid Al-Harati to strengthen national unity and rally support for the 1951 Constitution.

In April 2014, it announced its first Board of Directors meeting in the Zawiyat Al-Dahmani district.

== Prince Mohammed El Senussi ==
The movement refers to Crown Prince Mohammed El Senussi as "the holder of constitutional legitimacy" and advocates for his reinstatement as leader of Libya. It frequently shares press releases and speeches by the Prince himself commenting on important matters of the Libyan state.

On August 9, 2017, the movement shared a statement by Prince Senussi honoring the seventy-seventh anniversary of the establishment of the Libyan army.

It circulated a press release from Prince Senussi who cautioned political leaders and their international sponsors that lifting the arms embargo on Libya could lead to more conflict and extremism.

In December 2016, the movement shared the video of a speech by Prince Senussi on December 24, 2016 through a "Free Libya" Vimeo account, stating "we ask Allah Almighty to make and accelerate the release and save Libya on his hands."

== International coverage ==
U.S.-based New York Times published an article in February 2016 titled "A Radical Idea to Rebuild a Shattered Libya: Restore the Monarchy." The article described how since the Colonel Gaddafi's 1969 coup and dissolution of the monarchy, "the popular memory of King Idris, who died in Cairo in 1983, has quietly endured in Libya." It summarizes supporters' hope to "restore a form of monarchy […] to let Libyans rally behind a respected father figure and begin to rebuild their splintered nation."

In 2014, German outlet Deutsche Welle commented that "the security situation in Libya remains chaotic – not ideal conditions to draw up a new constitution. But a 63-year-old constitution, framed under the old monarchy, could help the federalists." In reference to reintroducing the monarchy, it said "at the moment, the old kingdom looks a lot more attractive than the Gadhafi era or the current state of near-anarchy."

== See also ==
- Libyan politics
- Movement for the Return of Constitutional Legitimacy – Zliten
