= Mohammed El Senussi =

Mohammed El Senussi: محمد السنوسي
- Crown Prince of Libya
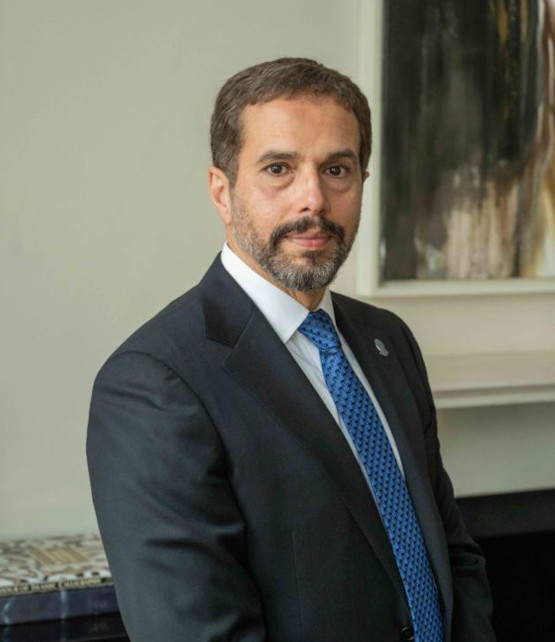
- Mohammed in 2022

Head of the Royal House of Libya
- Tenure: 28 April 1992 – present
- Predecessor: Hasan
- Born: 20 October 1962 (age 64); Tripoli, Kingdom of Libya
- House: Senussi
- Father: Hasan
- Mother: Sayyida Fawzia bint Tahir
- Religion: Sunni Islam

Prince Mohammed El Senussi (Arabic: محمد السنوسي; Sayyid Mohammed er-Rida bin Seyyed Hasan er-Rida el-Mahdi es-Senussi; occasionally spelled as "...Al Senussi", "as-Senussi", "al/el-Senussi"; born 20 October 1962) is the son of Crown Prince Hasan as-Senussi of Libya, and of Crown Princess Fawzia bint Tahir, daughter of Sayyid Tahir Bakeer. Born in Tripoli, he is considered by Libyan royalists to be the legitimate heir to the Senussi Crown of Libya.

Mohammed El Senussi has been an active commentator on Libyan affairs since the start of the Libyan Civil War. Senussi publicly supported the demonstrations against the Gaddafi regime while advocating for the restoration of peace.

The Movement for the Return of Constitutional Legitimacy and its affiliated groups, such as the Libyan Constitutional Union, in Libya advocate for the reinstatement of the 1951 Constitution and the return of the Senussi constitutional monarchy under Mohammed El Senussi's leadership.

== Biography ==
Styles of Crown Prince Mohammed El Senussi
- Reference style: His Royal Highness
- Spoken style: Your Royal Highness

Colonel Muammar Gaddafi overthrew Mohammed El Senussi's grand-uncle King Idris and his father the Crown Prince on 1 September 1969 in the Al Fateh Revolution. Gaddafi detained the royal family and held them under house arrest. In 1982, their house with belongings was destroyed and the family moved into a shack on the beach. Before being allowed to emigrate to the United Kingdom in 1988, Prince Mohammed spent some time in the early 1980s working at the Libyan Ministry of Agriculture.

Mohammed El Senussi received his education in the United Kingdom. On 18 June 1992, he was appointed as heir by his father to succeed him in death as Crown Prince and Head of the Royal House of Libya. He is unmarried and speaks Arabic and English.

== Family background and history ==
Mohammed El Senussi's great-great-grandfather, Muhammad ibn Ali as-Senussi, founded the Senussi order in 1837. A scholar from Mustaghanim, Algeria who traced his ancestry to Fatima, daughter of Muhammad, the prophet of Islam, Muhammad ibn Ali as-Senussi traveled extensively across northern Africa and the Hijaz while preaching a revivalist and mystical Islamic way of life and attracting countless disciples. Senussi ultimately settled in Cyrenaica in the early 1840s and founded the first zawiya (lodge dedicated to religious and social purposes) in al-Beida in 1842. In 1856, Senussi relocated the center of the Order south to Jaghbub which also became the host of a new Islamic University "second only in Africa to al-Azhar."

Mohammed El Senussi's great-grandfather and the eldest son of Muhammad ibn Ali as-Senussi, Muhammad al-Mahdi, succeeded his father as the Grand Senussi in 1859. Under his leadership, the Senussi Order spread to large parts of pagan and Islamic Africa, ultimately establishing approximately 146 zawaya and bringing the majority of Cyrenaica's Bedouins under the order's influence. During this time, "the Senussiya brought law and order, curbed raiding, encouraged peaceful trade, and promoted agriculture in a remarkable, civilizing mission amid highly unpromising surroundings."

Muhammad al-Mahdi died in 1902 and his nephew, Ahmad al-Sharif assumed leadership of the Senussi Order. Despite fighting with Ottoman support against the European colonizers, Sharif and the Senussi order struggled to oppose French, British, and Italian expansion in the Sahara. In 1918, Ahmed al-Sharif went into exile in Turkey. Ahmed Sharif nominated Muhammad Idris as-Senussi, Mohammed El Senussi's great-uncle, who had already begun to play a leadership role in the Senussi Order, as his successor.

Unlike his uncle who opted for military confrontation with the Italian and European colonialists, Muhammad Idris led the Senussi Order into negotiations with the Italians in 1916 and 1917, resulting in local autonomy for the Sanussi Order in Cyrenaica, and in 1920, the granting of the title of amir of Cyrenaica to Idris as-Senussi. When negotiations broke down, however, Idris and the Senussi Order emerged as British-allied leaders of the resistance to Italy's colonial occupation of Libya, culminating with Libya's independence, the first African state to achieve independence from European rule, in 1951. The United Nations authorized the formation of a federal system of government with the monarch, Idris as-Senussi, as the king and head of state. Idris as-Senussi served as the King of Libya from 1951 until 1969 when the military coup d'état led by Muammar Gaddafi took power in Libya.

== Heir to the Senussi Crown in Libya ==
The 1951 Constitution of Libya established a hereditary monarchy based on King Idris and his male successors. Article 44 of the 1951 Constitution states:

subject to what has been provided in Article 40, sovereignty shall be vested by the nation in trust with the King Mohammed Idris el Mahdi el Senussi and after him to his male heirs, the oldest after the oldest, degree after degree

Article 45 of the 1951 Constitution states:

the Throne of the Kingdom is hereditary in accordance with the two Royal Orders promulgated on 22nd of Safar 1374 H., and the 25th of Rabi'e el-Thani 1376 H., respectively. Each of these two Orders regulating the succession to the Throne shall have the same forces as an article of this Constitution.

However, King Idris did not have any sons. As a result, King Idris appointed his brother and Mohammed El Senussi's grandfather, Muhammad Rida Al-Mehdi al-Senoussi as Crown Prince. After the Crown Prince's death in 1955, King Idris appointed his nephew and Mohammed El Senussi's father, Hasan as-Senussi, as Crown Prince on November 25, 1956, through a Royal Decree. Section 2 of the Royal Decree states:

If the King were to die without a male Heir his wife not being pregnant, or if she were pregnant but the pregnancy was not to result in an Heir to the Throne, then the Crown would be retained by His Royal Highness Prince Al-Hassan Al-Rida who would become the origin of future successions to continue through His line according to the rulings of our Order to reorganise the Royal Household issues on 20 October 1954.

On August 4, 1969, King Idris announced his planned abdication in favor of the Crown Prince (to take effect September 2, 1969) writing that "Now I hand it over to the forty-three-year-old Crown Prince el-Sayyid el-Hasan el-Rida el-Mehdi el-Senoussi, who is to be regarded from today as King el-Hasan el-Rida el-Mehdi el-Senoussi." The 1969 coup d'état was carried out shortly after on September 1.

After seeking medical treatment in London in 1988, Mohammed El Senussi's father, Crown Prince Hasan as-Senussi, died in 1992. With the death of his father, and in accordance with the 1951 Libyan Constitution, Mohammed El Senussi became the rightful heir to the Senussi throne in 1992, a position he has held ever since.

A rival claim is also advanced by his distant relative Idris bin Abdullah. According to Debrett's Peerage, an institution that tracks royal lineage, Idris bin Abdullah is "the second son of the sixth son of the second son of the younger brother of King Idris's father." The Libyan Constitutional Union, founded in 1981 in opposition to the Gaddafi regime, refers to Prince Mohammed El Senussi as the legitimate heir to the Senussi Crown.

== Positions on the Libyan Civil War ==
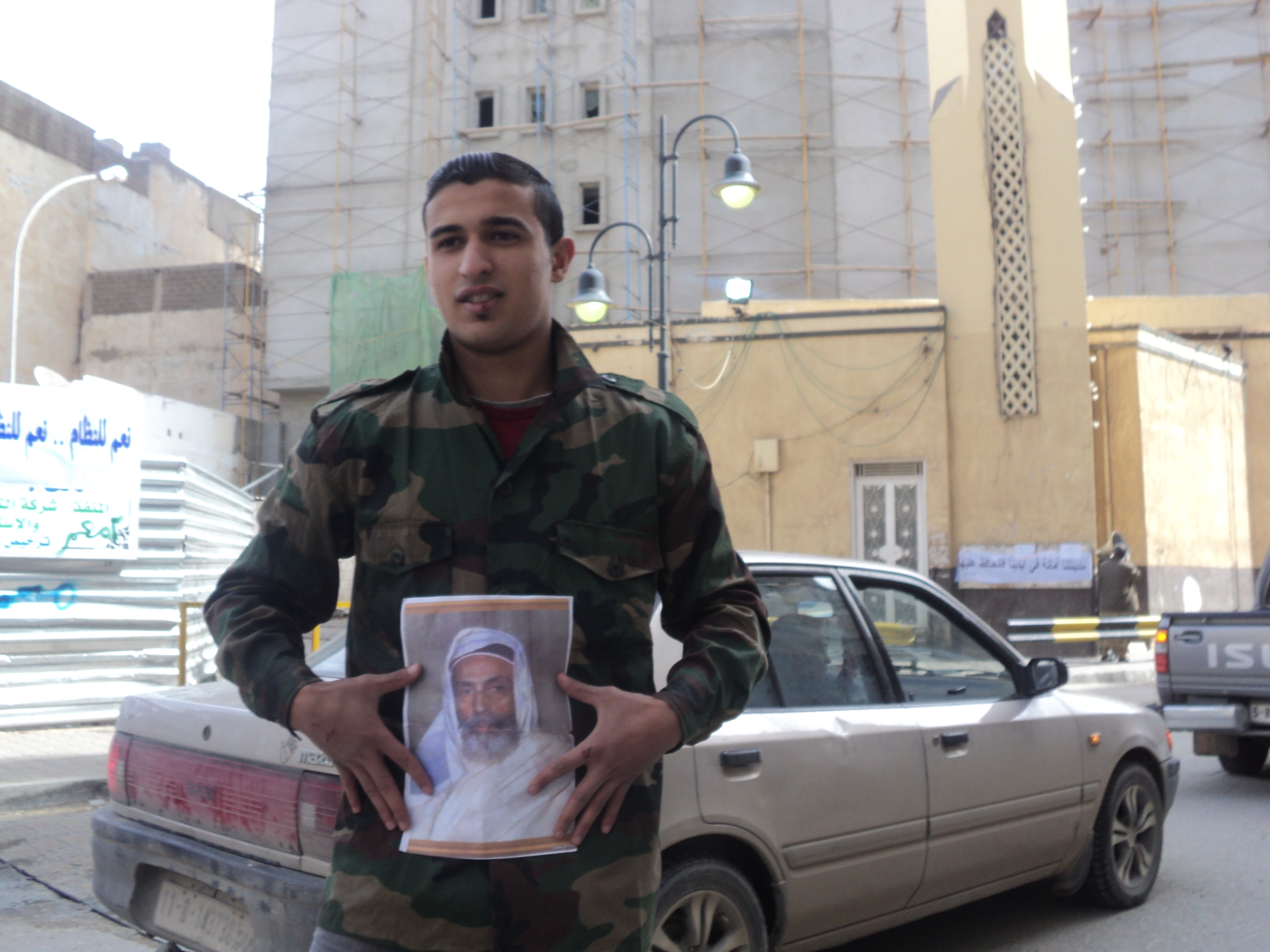
A young Benghazian carrying King Idris' photo. Support of the royal Senussi dynasty has traditionally been strong in Cyrenaica.

During the Libyan Civil War, Mohammed El Senussi emerged as a prominent public figure in support of the public demonstrations against the Gaddafi regime. El Senussi spoke publicly in support of the protesters while advocating for the return of peace in Libya.

Senussi sent his condolences "for the heroes who have laid down their lives, killed by the brutal forces of Gaddafi" and called on the international community "to halt all support for the dictator with immediate effect." El Senussi said that the protesters would be "victorious in the end" and called for international support to end the violence.

On 24 February 2011, Senussi gave an interview to Al Jazeera English in which he called upon the international community to help remove Gaddafi from power and stop the ongoing "massacre". He dismissed talk of a civil war, saying, "The Libyan people and the tribes have proven they are united".

Questioned about what shape a new government could take, and whether the 1951 royal constitution could be revived, Senussi said that such questions are "premature and are issues that are to be decided by the Libyan people," adding that for now the priority is to stop the "killing of innocent people." On whether he desires to return to Libya he said, "The Senussi family considers itself as in the service of the Libyan people." When asked about reestablishing the monarchy, he has stated that he "is a servant to Libyan people, and they decide what they want".

The White House said it will not specify which individuals and groups it is working and reaching out with, when asked if it supports El Senussi's calls for international support.

In an interview with Asharq Al-Awsat, he stated that it is too early to answer if the monarchy in Libya could be restored and if he will be active in Libyan politics. He also says the main objective is to end the violence on the streets in Libya.

On 4 March, he called the West to use airstrikes against Gaddafi after his contacts in Libya told him they need airstrikes. He also argued that a no-fly zone would be insufficient but later called for the no-fly zone.

He later stated that international community needs "less talk and more action" to stop the violence. He has asked for a no-fly zone over Libya but does not support foreign ground troops. He sent a letter to current UN secretary general Ban Ki-moon calling the UN to impose the no fly zone. He has also stated that a no-fly zone is the only way to stop Gaddafi who he has said is relying completely on the air force. He viewed the departure of Moussa Koussa as a sign that the government is falling with in. He also does not think there will be a stalemate.

On 20 April 2011, Mohammed spoke in front of the European Parliament calling for more support for Libya. He also stated that he would support any form of government that Libya would choose after Gaddafi, including a constitutional monarchy.

On 21 September 2011, Mohammed visited Rome to meet members of the Italian government and the Libyan opposition.

On 20 October 2011, Mohammed hailed the death of Gaddafi and the fall of Sirte as a victory of peace and freedom. He views it as opening a new chapter in Libyan history and that the "era of oppression" was behind them now.

== Support in Libya ==
Support in Libya for the return of the 1951 Constitution and the Senussi monarchy has increased significantly since the start of the Libyan Civil War and is especially prevalent on social media. Active groups advocating for the reinstatement of the 1951 Constitution and the return of the Senussi monarchy have emerged in Tripoli, Zliten, Jebel Akhdar, and other cities across Libya. These groups call themselves Movements for the Return of Constitutional Legitimacy and frequently host public events showcasing their support for the 1951 Constitution and the leadership of Prince Mohammed El Senussi.

In addition to frequent conferences and public advocacy in favor of the reinstatement of the constitutional monarchy led by Mohammed El Senussi, members of the Libyan government have also spoken out in support of the return of the monarchy. In 2014, former Libyan Minister of Foreign Affairs Mohamed Abdel Aziz called for the return of a constitutional monarchy as a "uniting symbol for the nation." Abdel Aziz also made contact with Mohammed El Senussi to discuss the matter.

Despite the growing support for the return of the Constitutional monarchy under his leadership, Prince Mohammed El Senussi has insisted that it is up to the Libyan people to decide the future of their country.

=== National Conference for the Activation of the Constitution of Independence ===
Nearly a thousand Libyan citizens gathered to attend the National Conference for the Activation of the Constitution of Independence, held in October 2017 in the city of Gharyan. The conference was broadcast live on Libyan television and was the first of similar future events to take place in Tobruk, Beida and Jaghbub as part of the larger Movement for the Return of Constitutional Legitimacy occurring across the country.

Supporters at the event advocated for the restoration of the 1951 Constitution and the constitutional monarchy, which brought unity, stability and autonomy to Libya until Colonel Gaddafi's 1969 coup. They assert a return to the 1951 Constitution (amended in 1963) is the only path forward for a peaceful Libya.

Heir to the throne, Prince Mohammed El Senussi, was widely referenced by the conference's attendees as the leader of the Libyan people according to the Constitution of Independence."

Attendees called upon the Crown Prince to "assume all his constitutional powers and resume the constitutional life that the Founding Fathers created."

== Recent developments ==
Since the Gaddafi regime was removed from power in Libya, Mohammed El-Senussi has used his position as Crown Prince of Libya to advocate for a better future for the Libyan people.

On 8 December 2011, Mohammed met with members of the Filipino government to discuss lifting the ban on deployment to Libya by the Philippine government. He also praised the Filipino health workers that refused to abandon their post and continued treating citizens in Tripoli during the war.

On 6 March 2012, Eastern Libyans declared their desire for autonomy in Benghazi. Mohammed's relative, Ahmed al-Senussi was announced as the leader of the self-declared Cyrenaica Transitional Council.

On 5 March 2014, the Libyan Transitional Government rehabilitated the Senussi family. The government's decree restored the citizenship of the former King's relatives and paved the way for the return of their confiscated property.

On 24 December 2014, Mohammed called on Libyans to unite and lay personal interests aside in favour of national ones, speaking publicly for the first time in over three years in a video recording.

Mohammed El Senussi Senussi dynasty Born: October 20 1962
Titles in pretence
Preceded by Crown Prince Hasan	— TITULAR — King of Libya; 28 April 1992 – present Reason for succession failure: Monarchy abolished in 1969	Incumbent
Religious titles
Preceded by Crown Prince Hasan	Chief of the Senussi order 28 April 1992 – present	Incumbent
