= Ahmed al-Senussi =

Libyan politician (born 1934)

- أحمد السنوسي
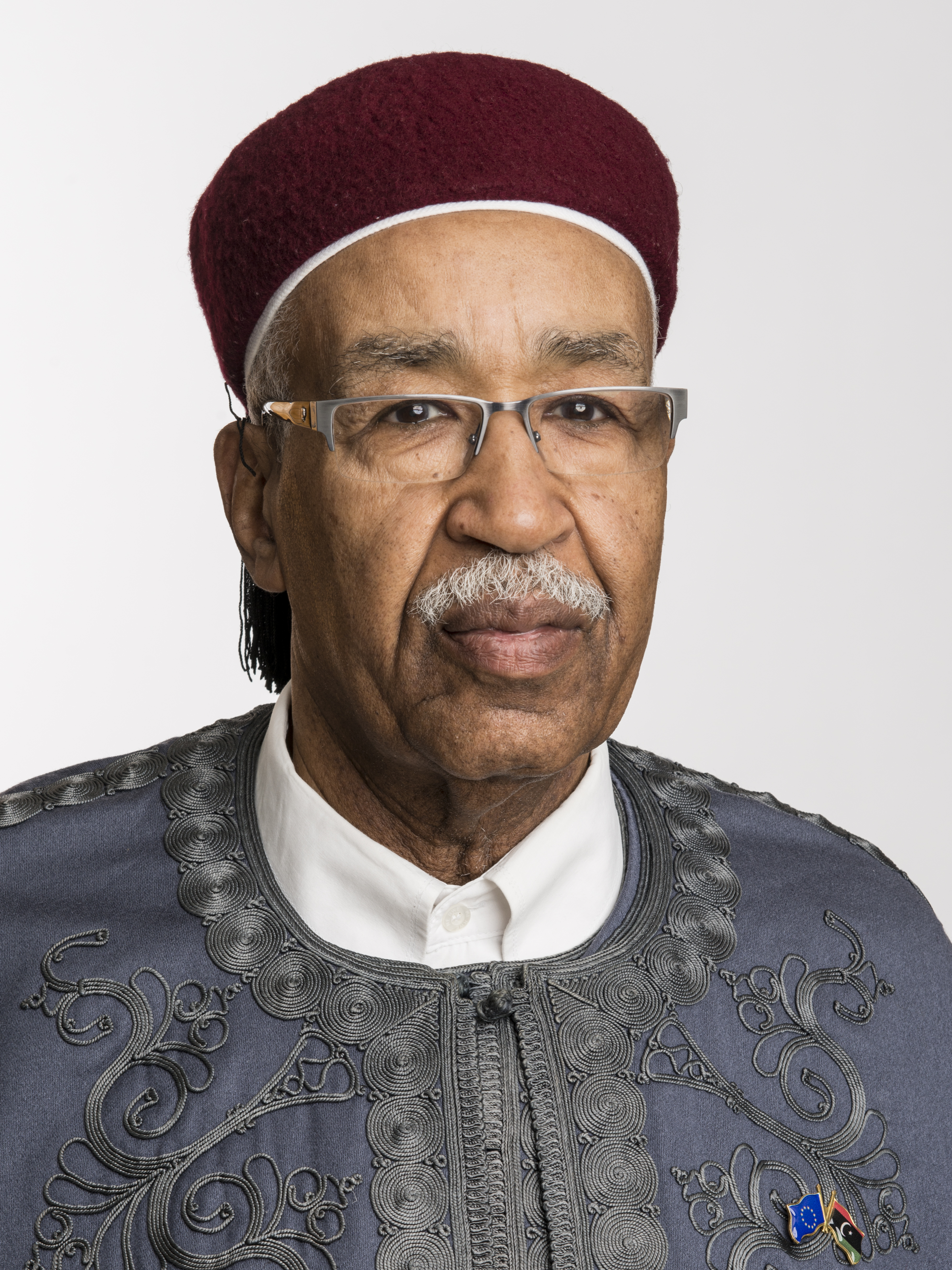
- Studio portrait, 2013
- Born: Ahmad Mindas bin Sayyid al-Zubayr al-Sanussi; 1934 (age 91–92); Marsa Matrouh, Egypt
- Citizenship: Libyan
- Occupation: Politician
- Known for: Member of the National Transitional Council
- Parent(s): Sayyid al-Zubayr bin Sayyid Ahmad as-Sharif al-Sanussi; Sayyida Fatima binti Sayyid Muhammad al-Rida al-Sanussi

Prince Ahmed Al-Zubair al-Senussi, also known as Zubeir Ahmed El-Sharif (Arabic: أحمد الزبير الشريف السنوسي; born 1934) is a Libyan member of the Senussi house and a member of the National Transitional Council representing political prisoners.

== Biography ==
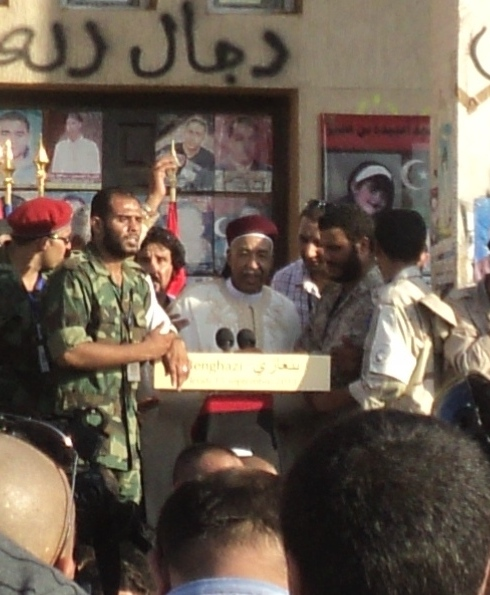
al-Senussi speaking to people in Benghazi circa 2011.

He is a grandcousin of King Idris of Libya and a nephew of Queen Fatimah of Libya, and was named after his grandfather Ahmed Sharif as-Senussi. Ahmed al-Senussi graduated from the Military Academy of Iraq in 1958. In 1961 he married his wife Fatilah, since deceased.

In 1970, he began planning to overthrow Muammar Gaddafi one year after Gaddafi had seized power in a military coup. Along with his brother and other conspirators, he sought to replace the Gaddafi government and allegedly give people a chance to choose between a monarchy or a constitutional republic. He was arrested and sentenced to death; however, in 1988 his sentence was commuted to an additional 13 years incarceration, and his family was allowed to visit him. He stayed in solitary confinement for the first nine years of his sentence and was allegedly frequently tortured. He claims that the torture included frequent beatings with sticks, being strung up by his hands and legs, nearly drowned, and having his feet broken. After being let out of solitary confinement, he shared a cell with numerous other prisoners, including Omar El-Hariri. After being transferred to Abu Salim prison in 1984, he learned that his wife had died while he was in captivity. He received a pardon on the 32nd anniversary of Gaddafi taking power, and received US$ 107,300 (131,000 Libyan dinars) and a monthly pension of US$314.62 (400 Libyan dinars). He was held as a political prisoner for 31 years until his release in 2001, making him the longest incarcerated prisoner in modern Libyan history.

On 27 October 2011, the European Parliament chose him with four other Arab people to win Sakharov Prize for Freedom of Thought in 2011.

On 6 March 2012, Ahmed al-Senussi was announced as the leader of the self-declared Cyrenaica Transitional Council.

== Ancestry ==
Ancestors of Ahmed al-Senussi

16. Sayyid Muhammad bin Ali al-Sanussi al-Khattabi al-Mujahiri al-Idrisi al-Hasani, 1st Grand Sanussi (= 24)
8. Sayyid Muhammad as-Sharif bin Sayyid Muhammad al-Sanussi
17. Fatima bint Ahmad bin Farajallah al-Fituri (= 25)
4. Sayyid Ahmad as-Sharif Pasha bin Sayyid Muhammad as-Sharif al-Sanussi, 3rd Grand Sanussi
18. Abu Musa Umran bin Baraka al-Fituri
9. Khadija bint Abu Musa Umran al-Fituri
2. Sayyid al-Zubayr bin Sayyid Ahmad as-Sharif al-Sanussi
5. Hawa al-Quraniyya
1. Ahmed al-Senussi
24. Sayyid Muhammad bin Ali al-Sanussi al-Khattabi al-Mujahiri al-Idrisi al-Hasani, 1st Grand Sanussi (= 16)
12. Sayyid Muhammad al-Mahdi bin Sayyid Muhammad al-Sanussi, 2nd Grand Sanussi
25. Fatima bint Ahmad bin Farajallah al-Fituri (= 17)
6. Sayyid Muhammad al-Rida Pasha, Crown Prince of Libya
26. Muqarrib al-Barasi
13. Aisha bint Muqarrib al-Barasi
3. Sayyida Fatima binti Sayyid Muhammad al-Rida al-Sanussi
7. Fatima al-Furiyya
