= Movement for the Return of Constitutional Legitimacy – Zliten =

Chapter in the Libyan political organization

- Location: Zliten, Libya

The Movement for the Return of Constitutional Legitimacy – Zliten (in Arabic: زليتن مدينة - الدستورية للشرعية العودة حراك) seeks to reinstate the 1951 Constitution of Libya, proclaiming it a symbol of the sovereignty of the nation and a guarantor of unity. Zliten is one of the several cities within Libya that is actively involved in the larger movement, the Movement for the Return of Constitutional Legitimacy in Libya.

The Movement for the Return of Constitutional Legitimacy in Libya asserts that the internationally recognized 1951 Constitution amended in 1963 established a legitimate and independent governing structure for the Libyan homeland and comprises the best solution for Libya’s future. Advocates for the movement in Zliten state that “[Libya’s] Constitution is a national social charter approved by a constituent body representing all the spectrums of the Libyan people […] Allah bless our independence!”

Along with revival of the 1951 Constitution, the movement, particularly in Zliten, supports the restoration of the Senussi monarchy with heir apparent Prince Mohammed El Senussi, son of Crown Prince Hasan as-Senussi and grandnephew of late King Idris, as its leader.

== Support for the Zliten movement on social media ==
The Zliten local movement has an active presence on social media, including 14,786 total “likes” and 14,741 followers on its Facebook page. Below is a selection of posts from its page:

“Political malice as the purity of the Founding Fathers who have placed it for us, not a commodity in the market of political impurity.”

“The Constitutional Kingdom of Libya achieved social reconciliation and transitional justice […] The Constitutional Kingdom of Libya preserved the sanctity of citizens […] The Constitutional Kingdom of Libya has achieved for its citizens an adequate standard of living.”

== Local events ==
The movement has hosted several events with hundreds of supporters in attendance focused on advocating for the restoration of the 1951 Libyan Constitution.

On December 24, 2015, the movement hosted an event in Zliten to celebrate the 64th anniversary of the Independence of Libya.

It hosted another event on February 17, 2016 for the adoption of the national anthem.

On December 24, 2016, the movement hosted a similar event in support of renewing the campaign to reclaim the deleted part of the national anthem. The details provided were:

“We call on the Libyan people to contribute to support this campaign aimed at restoring things to normal and a return to consider the leader of independence and founder of the state of modern Libya King The late Muhammad Idris al-Sanusi (may Allaah have mercy on him).”

== Related international attention ==
An article in support of reestablishing the 1951 Constitution was published in the Washington, D.C.-based Middle East Institute.

The article refers to the 1963 Constitution as “more than an olive branch” and states the following:

“Libyans will have no choice but to soon make some hard decisions. One such option is returning to the region-conscious 1963 constitution. An earlier constitution in 1951 had granted a great deal of authority to the regions […]The return to the 1963 constitution is gaining momentum in Libya, with several movements, ranging from royalists to pro-democracy activists, calling for an adoption of the constitution.”

A similar article was published in Australia by The Australian magazine, noting that:

“Libyan monarchists are now quietly resurfacing, amid calls to revive the unifying constitution of 1951. A spokesman for Prince Mohammed said he was “ready to return to Libya if the people demand it […] Monarchy still works in North Africa and the Middle East. The Arab leaders overthrown in 2011 were the heads of republics. The royal dynasties of Morocco and Jordan (another kingdom forged with British support) remain hugely popular while demonstrating a knack for moving with the times.”

The article also states that:

“A restoration of the Senussi dynasty might help to reunite the warring tribes. Even some militia commanders favour a return of the monarchy. The spiritual status of the Senussi chiefs (Idris described himself as a direct descendant of the Prophet) would offer a strong religious counterpoint to the brutal fundamentalism of Isis.”

== Mohammed El Senussi ==
Libyan royalists widely consider Prince Mohammed El Senussi, son of Crown Prince Hasan as-Senussi and grandnephew of late King Idris, to be the legitimate heir to the Senussi Crown of Libya.

The movement in Zliten has voiced its opinion that the natural solution to the Libyan crisis is to reinstate the 1951 Constitution (as amended in 1963) with Crown Prince Mohammed El Senussi as the legitimate leader. The Zliten movement promotes the Prince’s leadership on its Facebook page and frequently circulates articles and speeches from the Prince’s website.
