= Battle of Oum Souigh =

- Part of Khalifa Ben Asker's revolt
Date	October 1915
Location	Oum Souigh, Tunisia
Result	See aftermath

Belligerents
(Tunisia) Ouled Debab	France

Commanders and leaders
(Tunisia) Omar Al Guallati (Tunisia) Cheikh Ali Ben Abdellatif † (Tunisia) Hadj Said Ben Abdellatif † (Tunisia) Ben Azouz Ben El Hadj Ali; Khalifa Ben Asker	(France) Maréchal Ristori (WIA) (France) Adjudant Clement Ellie Richard †; Caporal Eugène Émile Daumas † (France) Capitaine Pierre Antoine Auguste Anne Marie De Bermond de Vaulx † (France) commandant Lambert (France) Capitaine de Bermond †

Strength
3000 rebels	3000 soldiers

Casualties and losses
Unknown	Heavy

== Battle ==
Only two days before the Battle of Oum Souigh, Khalifat Ben Asker established his camp at Bir Tous, where he was assisted and advised by a German officer. On October 3, 1915, he launched a major assault against the French outpost of Oum Souigh with nearly 3,000 insurgents. Inside the post, around 100 French soldiers under Captain de Bermond suddenly found themselves trapped in a desperate situation, cut off from communication, running low on water and food, and facing constant attacks from all sides.

The Audibert company, stationed at Fatnasiya four kilometers away, was ordered to move toward Oum Souigh on 6 October. However, all relief attempts failed, and Audibert withdrew to Fetnessia, believing that the center of the camp had been occupied by tribal forces.

By the second day of the siege, after a first French relief force had already been pushed back, Ben Asker sent a message directly to Captain de Bermond, offering him a chance to surrender peacefully:

“I inform you that I have attacked Dehiba and Tataouine. If you want peace, you only have to leave your weapons on the ground and come out. I give you my word that no one will be killed.”

The battle reached a dramatic turning point when the insurgents managed to break through the French defensive lines and infiltrate the camp itself. The French officers suddenly found themselves surrounded, and Captain de Bermond was killed during the fighting. For a few terrifying moments, the entire position descended into chaos as brutal hand-to-hand combat erupted throughout the outpost.

Despite the confusion, Lieutenant Paolini succeeded in regrouping the remaining defenders and organizing a counterattack that forced the insurgents back out of the camp. Meanwhile, the French high command dispatched a relief column under Commander Mérand to break the siege. Before reaching Oum Souigh, the column encountered insurgent forces blocking the route, leading to a violent engagement against the fighters of Sheikh Saïd Ben Abdellatif, leader of the Ouled Debbab, who would later be killed during the clashes.

Even after days without proper rest, food, or water, the defenders of Oum Souigh refused to surrender. When the siege was finally broken on October 9, nearly half of the garrison had been lost, but the post had held. For the French military, Oum Souigh became one of the most symbolic battles of the South Tunisian campaign.

== Aftermath ==
On 9 October, Oum Souigh was finally relieved by a column led by Colonel Flick. The operation resulted in heavylosses for the French army, but Oum Souigh nevertheless remained under French control.

After the battle, the two wives of Khalifa Ben Asker including Saïda Bent El Hadj Saïd with his children, Oum Saad and Sassi, were relocated because of threats directed at their husbands. This act further intensified tensions between the French Army and the insurgents.
