= Black Prince conspiracy =

Attempted coup against Colonel Gaddafi

The Black Prince conspiracy was a 1970 coup plot by former officers of the Libyan Kingdom to overthrow Muammar Gaddafi's newly established regime and restore the Senussi monarchy, which had ruled Libya until the 1969 Libyan Revolution. The conspiracy was named after Ahmed al-Senussi, a member of the Senussi royal family who was reportedly involved in the plot.

The conspirators, numbering about 200 soldiers, planned to invade Libya from neighbouring Chad. Their objective was to capture the town of Sebha, in the Fezzan region of Southern Libya, which would serve as a staging ground for the retaking of major cities such as Tripoli and Benghazi, with the eventual goal of bringing back the Libyan monarchy and undoing the changes brought about by Gaddafi's revolution.

The conspiracy was reportedly supplied with arms by external powers, including Israel. Muammar Gaddafi dismissed the conspirators as "reactionary retired police officers and contractors" seeking to restore the old regime for their own gain, as it had benefited them in the past.

The planned coup was prematurely thwarted when government authorities discovered a cache of weapons in Sebha, which led to the arrests of around 20 people involved, who were later sentenced to varying terms of prison.

Following the suppression of the conspiracy, the Gaddafi government took major steps in consolidating power, such as removing any remnants of colonial influence, expelling foreign military bases, and targeting foreign-owned – including Italian-owned – businesses. These measures were part of a broader effort to transform Libyan society by asserting Arab and Islamic identity and also the nationalization of the economy.
