= Khalifa Ben Asker's revolt =

Uprising in Tunisia, 1915–1918

- Part of World War I
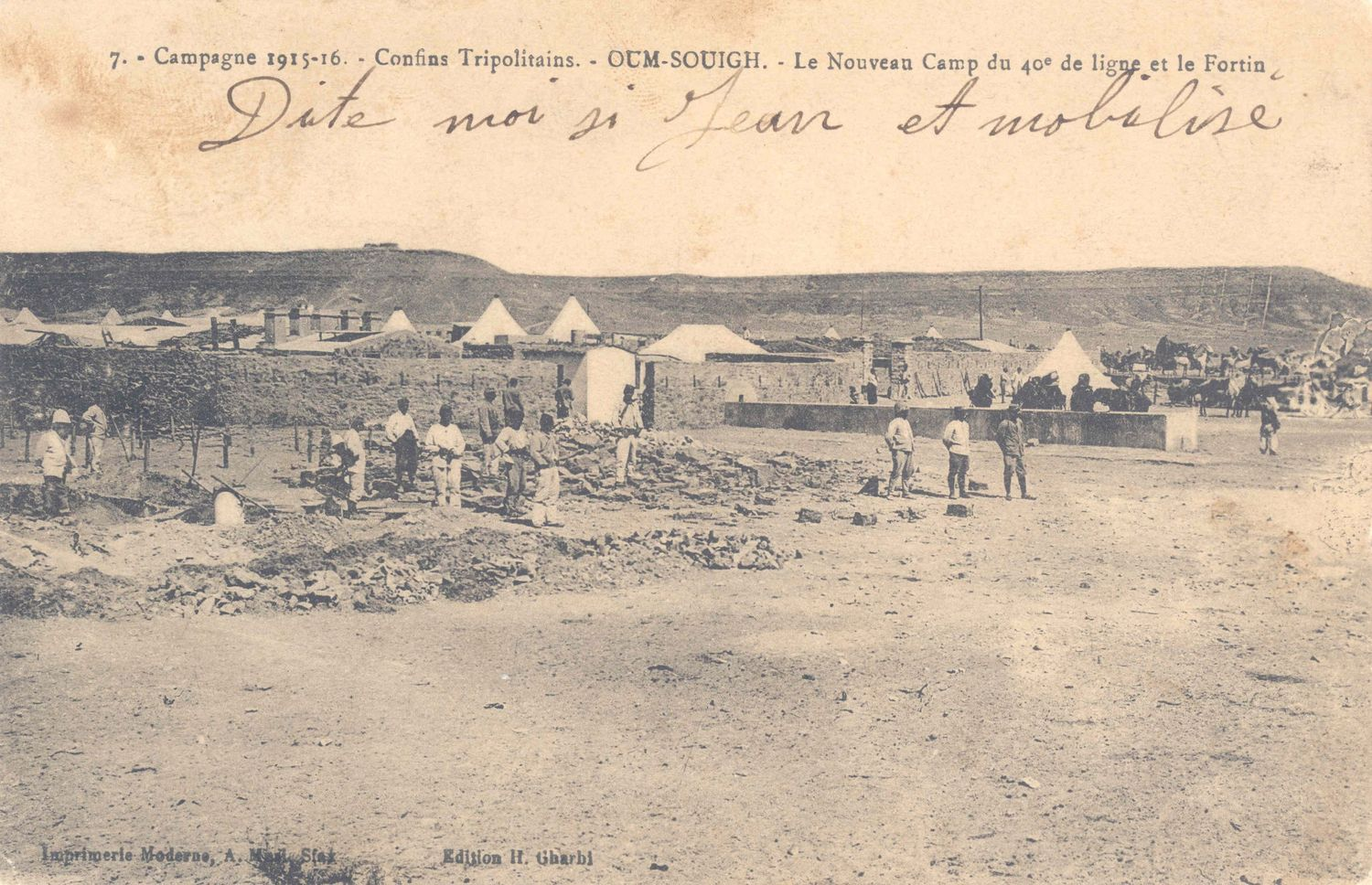
- Oum Souigh military post, 1915–1916
Date	January 1915 – October 1918
Location	North Africa
Result	Italian-French victory
Territorial changes	French colonial rule re-established

Belligerents
France; (French protectorate of Tunisia) Tunisia; Italy; Tripolitania	(French protectorate of Tunisia) Tunisian rebels Senussi; Supported by: Ottoman Empire; German Empire

Commanders and leaders
(French Third Republic) Octave Meynier (French Third Republic) General Moinier (French Third Republic) General Boyer (Kingdom of Italy) Major Voglino (Kingdom of Italy) Major Ghisoni (POW) (French Third Republic) Lutaud	Khalifa Ben Asker (POW) (French protectorate of Tunisia) Amor Ben Asker (French protectorate of Tunisia) Mahdi Es Sunni (French protectorate of Tunisia) Si El Hashemi (French protectorate of Tunisia) Sliman El Barouni (Ottoman Empire) Noury Bey

Strength
(French Third Republic) 15,000 to 30,000	Unknown

Casualties and losses
(French Third Republic) ~2,296 casualties (Note: "…with 748 French and natives killed, and 1,548 dead from sickness and disease.")	800–1,000 killed

Khalifa Ben Asker's revolt was an anti-colonial uprising led by Khalifa Ben Asker against Italian and French control in Libya and Tunisia between 1915 and 1918, during World War I.

== Revolt ==
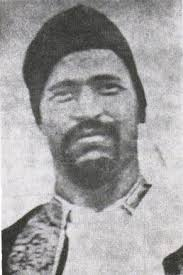
Khalifa Ben Asker

The revolt emerged as Tunisian rebel Khalifa Ben Asker and his supporters challenged the declining authority of the Senussi in southern Tunisia and in Tripolitania. Unrest worsened after the Italians began practising public hangings and destruction of villages, which caused several French officers to distance themselves from the Italians. French policy, known as "neutralité bienveillante", involved disarming and imprisoning certain rebel groups in Tunisia, while allowing the Italians to operate freely, which angered the local population. One of the leaders of the insurgents, Khalifa's brother, Amor Ben Asker, was forced into exile in Tunisia with 200 unarmed men.

In January 1915, the Italians advanced from Fort-Polignac toward Ghadames before being forced to seek refuge in Bir Pistor.

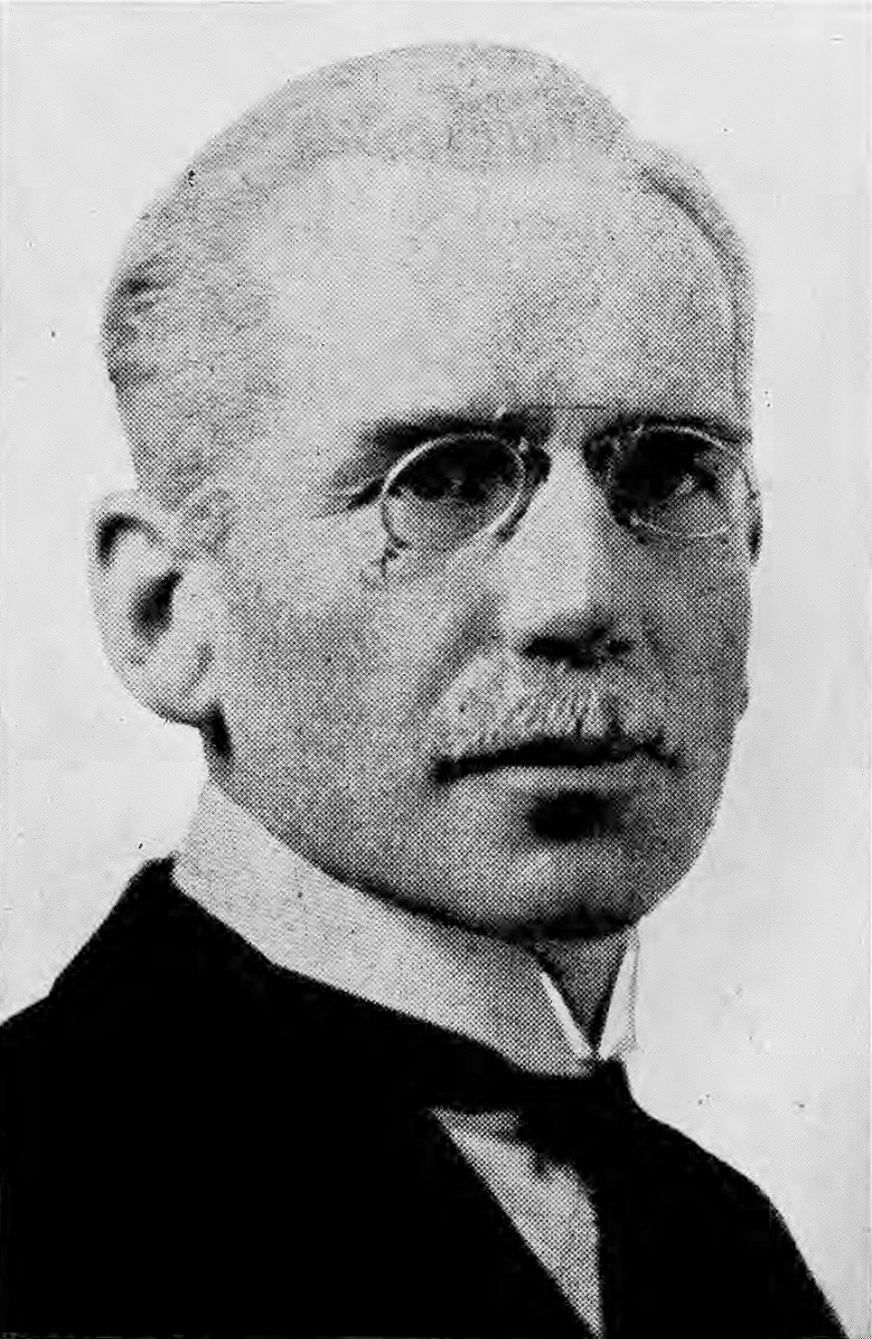
Portrait of General Octave Meynier

By February, a second Italian column led by Major Voglino re-established itself in Ghadames, pushing General Octave Meynier, commander of the Oasis territory, to redirect his troops toward the Ajjer region. French forces supplied arms and ammunition to the Italians despite having instructions to limit military aid to Ghadames.

In June, Ouazzane and Sinaoun were evacuated, and a defeat at Kabaw cost the Italians 250 men and leaves the insurgents with 600 rifles and significant supplies. In July, Nalut was abandoned, with several hundred Italians killed and the commander of the garrison, Major Ghisoni, taken prisoner with 130 men.

On July 19, the Italians evacuated Ghadames for the second time, leaving Tunisia. At the end of the month, the significant garrison of Zuwarah (3,000 men) abandoned the city to the insurgents. By the summer of 1915, the Italians only controlled Tripoli and its surroundings.

Khalifa Ben Asker, unable to secure the return of his brother Amor and the detainees at Douz, nor the authorization for his troops to come and resupply at the border market of Ben Gardane, attacked the Tunisian border posts with the help of German and Ottoman officers. At the same time, the population of Southern Tunisia begin to take up arms against the French.

On September 15, 1915, after a clash near Dehiba, French troops crossed the border and met 600 Tripolitanians at Ouazzane. Several battles took place between Dehiba and Oum Souigh.

On September 27, Dehibat was attacked and encircled. Oum Souigh was attacked by 2,000 combatants starting on October 2. Oum Souigh was cleared on the 9th at the cost of about one hundred dead. The arrival of 1,600 men from the Flick column, mobile patrol groups, the reoccupation of all posts, and the lifting of the siege of Dehibat mark the failure of the Tripolitanian offensive.

Khalifa Ben Asker was briefly arrested and imprisoned by order of the governor Souf. (Note: "What really checked Khalifa ben Asker was the fury of Mohammed Suf al-Mahmudi, who arrested him.") During the first months of 1916, the constant divisions among the Senussi leaders cause the disintegration of the political unity established under the nominal authority of Si Ahmed and his Tripolitanian proconsul, Souf.

By the end of May 1916, Zuwarah was reoccupied by the Italians. Despite shelling by warships, Khalifa Ben Asker's and Mahdi Es Sunni's troops took the Ibadhi citadel of Fossato at the end of the summer. By autumn, all positions still held by the Italian party fall one after the other. By the end of 1916, the Italians controlled only Zuwarah and Tripoli.

In 1917, the French army in Tunisia was reduced to 8,000 soldiers. In August and October 1918, Khalifa ben Asker launched his final attacks, responding to Prince Osman Fuad's call. (Note: "In 1917 the French strength in Tunisia fell back to 8,000 men. Khalifa ben Asker had a final flurry in August and October 1918, renewing his attacks in response to Prince Osman Fuad's call.")

By 1918, with World War I ending and France reinforcing its colonial rule, the revolt came to an end. Between 800 and 1,000 insurgents had died in total.

== Bibliography ==
- Meynier, Gilbert (1981). L'Algérie révélée (in French). pp. 491–495. ISBN 9782600040983.
- Allain, Jean-Claude (2008). Des étoiles et des croix (in French). ISBN 9782878544206.
- Ling, Dwight L. (1967). Tunisia, from protectorate to republic. Indiana University Press. ISBN 9782878544206.
- Martin, Roland (July 2018). Histoires de Tunisie (PDF). ISBN 9782900082188.
