= Network of Free Ulema – Libya =

- Location: Libya
- Region served: Libya
- Members: Unknown

The Network of Free Ulema – Libya is a group of senior religious leaders, or ulama, from all areas of Libya. Due to the persistent's security constraints with families and associates of those opposing Muammar Gaddafi being taken hostage none of the names of members have been released. However, they have been very vocal in the international media throughout the Libyan Civil War, releasing a constant stream of statements, appeals, calls, endorsements, responses and fatwas. Since the liberation of Libya the Network of Free Ulema have formed a larger organization of Libyan religious scholars called the League of Libyan Ulema, headed by Sheikh Umar Abdul Hamid al Mawlud.

== Members of the Network ==
The network consists of senior Muslim religious scholars or ulama, and each have various specializations and different tribal backgrounds from and around Libya. According to the background of the Network posted on the bottom of a press release the members make up a mixture of high-level figures, including senior judges, lawyers, doctors, engineers, university professors, intellectuals, as well as Sufi teachers, writers, and poets. According to the write-up on the network, these include a proportion of young people, and both men and women. Individuals are predominantly educated in Libya, however, there are also many individuals who received their education abroad. According to the Network's statements, they come from a diverse group of "different schools and outlooks" and they believe "in the richness of plurality, including the wisdom of dialogue and communication with all other faiths and cultures."

The network points to the suppression of civil society activity and the strength of the Gaddafi regime over its people during the four-decade-long reign of Muammar Gaddafi. They emphasize however about the Libyan civil society that their network:

…is only one dimension of Libya's very rich and sophisticated Civil Society, which has always been there, but has had to go clandestine for many years because of the regime's repressive policies. In the New Libya, all these seeds will sprout into a rich and vibrant culture, unified, and mutually respectful. For the time being, security conditions do not allow us to publish a list of members. We will publish such a list as soon as we can.

== Official Statements Libyan civil war ==
=== Press Releases ===
A number of press releases have been released in reaction to the civil war against the former Gaddafi regime.

- Saturday 19 February 2011 - STOP THE MASS KILLINGS OF PEACEFUL DEMONSTRATORS IN LIBYA

As the government responded to peaceful protests with massive violence the Libyan clerics released their first statement. The statement came from 'religious Scholars (Faqihs and Sufi Sheikhs), intellectuals, and clan elders from Tripoli, Bani Walid, Zintan, Jadu, Msalata, Misrata, Zawiya, and other towns and villages of the western area of our beloved Libya to all of humanity, to all men and women of good will'.,

- Monday 21 February 2011 - CALL FOR FULL REBELLION IN LIBYA,

On 21 February, the Network of Free Ulema called for full rebellion against the Gaddafi regime in Libya. This came after a massive crackdown on peaceful protest by the use of aircraft weaponry, and heavy artillery. The clerics called immediately for people's action against the regime, stating that is a religious duty to oppose tyranny and repression. They suggested that the actions of Gaddafi's government renders them 'undeserving of any obedience or support, and makes rebelling against them by all means possible a divinely ordained duty upon every able Muslim, male or female, to the extent of their capacity.' They also supported Sheikh Sadiq al Ghriani's fatwas against the government. The statement also called for the immediate release of Ghriani.

- Tuesday 22 February 2011 - URGENT APPEAL FOR HELP

Addressing an increasing humanitarian crisis after a number of days of protest and violent reprisals from state security forces the network appealed to heads of state and heads of international organizations for urgent assistance. The Network of Free Ulema, specifically asked the international community to 'immediately stop the genocide and crimes against humanity that are...being inflicted upon the Libyan people', and also 'to open up corridors, and borders, for the URGENT supply of medical and humanitarian aid, including mobile hospitals and hospital ships.'

- Tuesday 22 February 2011 - URGENT APPEAL TO HELP IN STOPPING MERCENARIES

After the understanding both in Libya and internationally, that mercenaries were being used to carry out acts of violence that Libyan soldiers may not be willing to carry out, such as the shooting of civilians the network launched an appeal to the international community of nations, of faiths, and of the international civil society. They launched an appeal seeking desperate help to stop the supply of mercenaries to Gaddafi into Libya, appealing to neighbour countries not to allow mercenaries to be flown from their nations, and to take both political and/or legal action against the companies in the security and aerospace that are providing services to Gaddafi. They also argued that these organizations or countries that were either directly or indirectly involved in the supply of mercenaries that were being used to quell peaceful protest with massive violence would be seen as facilitating crimes against humanity, and could be pursued through the International Criminal Court.

- Wednesday 23 February 2011 - ENDORSEMENT AND SUPPORT OF THE DECLARATIONS OF THE REVOLUTION OF 17 FEBRUARY 2011

The popular support of the rebellion against Gaddafi, and the refusal of Gaddafi to engage constructively with the protesters, and then a violent clampdown on protest, meant that an alternative political process became viable for recognition in Libya. The tone of such an alternative political process was underlined by those leading the revolution that started on 17 February. These were generally democratic in principle. The religious leaders of the Free Ulema network echoed the broader sentiment calling for the 'establishment of a new democratic government that is constitutional and that respects divinely endowed and internationally recognized human rights, the peaceful transition of power, diversity, an elected and clean government, the separation of powers (with checks and balances), that sincerely and faithfully strives to serve the brave men, women, and children of Libya with transparency, piety, and devotion. We call upon all Muslims, male and female, to support this new government and to work hard to protect our sovereign and united Libya and its capital Tripoli.

- Saturday 26 February 2011 - CALL FOR INTERNATIONAL ACTION

After it became clear that the United Nations Security Council and the international community as a whole were willing to move diplomatically against Muammar Gaddafi, the clerics made a call for international humanitarian efforts. They explained that thousands had already been killed, mirroring a figure that had been suggested by a number of media sources. A petition was also started to support the calls of the clerics on a prominent online petition website.

- Sunday 27 February 2011 - ENDORSEMENT AND SUPPORT OF THE NEW INTERIM GOVERNMENT

Because of major popular support for the uprising in Libya an interim government was created in the eastern-Libyan city of Benghazi, which was one of the first cities that experienced upheaval. The Network of Free Ulema immediately supported this entity as an alternative to Gaddafi's waning regime, and released an endorsement and statement of support for the Interim government. Their statement pointed to the mass bloodshed that on religious, humanitarian and moral grounds made Gaddafi's government illegitimate. It went on to support the sequence of Declarations of the Revolution of 17 February 2011, and the announcement of the formation of the newly created Libyan interim government in Benghazi by the lawyer Mustafa Abdel Jalil.

- Tuesday 1 March February 2011 - STOP KILLER BROADCASTING

The continued use of State television by the Gaddafi regime became a specific issue, once it became obvious that the remaining Gaddafi infrastructure was using the state television broadcasting system to call for mass violence against young protesters who were accused of being part of an Al Qaeda plot, and causing mass violence caused by hallucinogenic tablets. The statement was specifically addressed to the managers of broadcasting services and bandwidth-provision companies, who were said to be complicit in the broadcast of calls for violence. In particular Intelsat, Eutelsat, NileSat, and ArabSat were picked out as the organizations providing satellite capacity for the broadcast of Libyan state television. They appealed for a cessation of all broadcasting ability that was being accorded to a regime that has been accused of committing systematic crimes against humanity.

- Wednesday 2 March 2011 - CALL FOR WORLD RECOGNITION OF LIBYA'S NEW INTERIM NATIONAL COUNCIL AND GOVERNMENT

After their own endorsement of the interim national council on 27 February 2011, the clerics representing the Network of Free Ulema issued a call for all nations and then international organizations to formally recognize Libya's new interim council and government. They argued that the best way to offer support to the Libyan people was through the recognition of and engagement with the interim leadership.

The Network's website cited a list of cities, towns, regions, and organisations that supported the interim national council and government including Asabi'a, Zuwara, Gharyan, Yafran, Janzur, Nalut, Zawiya, Khoms, 'Aziziya, Qasr Bin Gashir, Zintan, Zelten, Jadu, Tamzin, Misrata, Bani Walid, Msallata, Ra's Lanuf, Brak, Ajdabiya, Jalu, Awjila, Kufra, Benghazi, Marj, Bayda, Derna, Tubruk, and Jaghbub. 'Many Divisions of the Libyan Army and Police have also declared their support, and a military coordination council has been successfully formed. Muslim scholars such as the Network of Free Ulema, and Sheikh al-Sadiq al-Ghriani have also firmly endorsed the interim national council and government. Our youth who started this remarkable transformation, through such youth networks as the Libyan Youth Movement, also support this interim council and government.'

- Tuesday 8 March 2011 - A NOTE OF THANKS TO THE GULF COOPERATION COUNCIL

The first week of March saw increasing diplomatic pressure against Gaddafi's government, and a number of overtures by the international community towards the Interim Transitional National Council, including a press statement by the French government which stopped just short of full recognition of the Benghazi based entity. The first Arab overtures to the National Council came from the international cooperation organization of the Arab states of the Persian Gulf. The Foreign Minister of the United Arab Emirates, H.E. Sheikh Abdallah Bin Zayed Al Nahyan, said in a foreign ministers' meeting of the Gulf Cooperation Council, held in Abu Dhabi on 7 March "we call on the international community, especially the UN Security Council, to face their responsibilities in helping the dear people of Libya." He went on to put forward one of the strongest calls yet for action, saying that the "massacres committed by the regime against their own citizens are crimes against humanity that require condemnation". The Gulf Cooperation Council ministers were united in their condemnation of the use of weapons against civilians and appealed to both the United Nations and the Arab League to safeguard the Libyan people.

- Tuesday 8 March 2011 - TO THE BRAVE WOMEN OF LIBYA

On International Women's Day 2011 the Network of Free Ulema – Libya released a statement speaking about the contribution of women to the fight against Gaddafi, and the central role of women to the construction of a 'free Libya'. They also expressed support for this year's theme, of 'equal access to education'.

- Tuesday 15 March 2011 - PROTECTING JOURNALISTS

After a series of brutal attacks, detentions, and one instance of a journalist being killed by Gaddafi's forces the Network released a statement to put their full weight behind the free media, and against the propaganda machinery of Gaddafi supported TV. The campaign of intimidation against free journalists and the jamming of respectable and open international media is a key aspect of Gaddafi's reasserted hold over the Libyan population, who can increasingly only watch stage-managed pro-Gaddafi media content. The reports on Gaddafi supported news media bear scant resemblance to the facts that are reported either by witnesses or by the international media as a whole.

=== Statements ===
- Thursday 3 March 2011 - RESPONSE TO THE CHAVEZ INITIATIVE

As soon as it was known by the public, the Network released a statement in regard to the peace negotiation proposal from Hugo Chavez to Gaddafi and his regime. The network argued that the alleged crimes against humanity that were committed by Gaddafi and his associates against the broader Libyan population rendered them illegitimate, and that the interim council with broad-based support from a majority of the populace was the legitimate conduit by through with to approach Libya with regarding international action.

== Public Comments and Interviews with News Media ==
=== Public Comments ===
On 3 March 2011, during a campaign of intimidation, prior to an expected demonstration after Friday Prayer on 4 March, where social media nodes, young people speaking to international media, and prominent critics of Gaddafi's circle were being kidnapped and allegedly tortured, the Network of Free Ulema released a public comment. Some sources also suggested that family members of individuals have been taken hostage and used as leverage. The comment read:

This is to URGENTLY notify the world and the International Criminal Court in particular, that Gaddafi and his criminal accomplices are currently implementing a massive kidnapping campaign in Tripoli and its vicinities in order to 'clean up' key youth leaders before tomorrow's Friday prayers, and in order to 'look good' to the international Media, which has been invited to Tripoli as part of a public relations campaign aimed at covering up the crimes against humanity that have been inflicted upon the brave Libyan people. We call upon and urge every man and woman of good will, worldwide, to do their utmost to save our youth from the hands of Gaddafi, his thugs, and mercenaries.

== Views on the Future Libyan Government ==
The statements and interviews of the Network of the Free Ulema reference a number of issues that paint a picture of their desires for a post-Gaddafi Libyan nation. Through these they seem to position themselves a moral voice or authority for Libya rather than as an entity with explicit political power. This sets them up in contrast to the politically entrenched position of the Iranian clergy, but also in contrast to the political apologia or apathy of many other national Muslim leaders.

=== Role of Religion in Politics ===
The Network underlines a separation of religious authority and political authority. In all statements that have been released the group has emphasized that they are not a political party. They see themselves as holders of moral authority suggesting that their "only agenda is that of upholding the highest religious, spiritual, moral, and human values, and the service of our beloved Libya."

The Network have in a number of different places asserted that idea that Libya should have a liberal and democratic political structure with inspiration and advice derived from religious leaders, seeing an integrated place for religion in public life, contrary for example to the secularism that exists in France. See this excerpt from interview with a member:

The Libyan people are a Muslim people of faith, even if religiosity varies from person to person, from secularists to leftists to those that are very deeply religious, and with a variety of religious schools. Yet the majority of Libyans are clearly traditionalist Muslims, following the old, mainstream, Azhari line. The one paradigm that is emerging to encompass all such variety is that of a liberal state. This is likely to be a localised form of Anglo-American liberalism that has lots of room for religiosity, and not an anti-religious secularism.

=== Sovereignty and Transition ===
The Network speaks about the need for a solution to the Libyan crisis that does not require foreign intervention. Probably from fears of becoming another Afghanistan or Iraq, the Network has stressed that any activity from foreign militaries must go through the interim country, so that it doesn't 'violate Libyan sovereignty': See excerpt from interview with media:

We are against any military intervention in our beloved country. However, the people have been overwhelmed by Gaddafi's air superiority. He has used jet fighters to fire at unarmed civilians. Therefore we do support a no-fly zone, even if it involves limited use of force. The world must recognize the Interim Council and Government, and the legitimate representatives of the Libyan people can then ask for help so as not to violate Libyan sovereignty.

=== Views on the New Constitution ===
There are some references to the desires that the network has for the new constitution. The network speaks about both 'divinely endowed' and 'internationally recognized' human rights, pointing to the possibility that the future government may not see a conflict between Islamic values and international treaties, as has been seen in other countries:

A new democratic government that is constitutional and that respects divinely endowed and internationally recognized human rights, the peaceful transition of power, diversity, an elected and clean government, the separation of powers (with checks and balances), that sincerely and faithfully strives to serve the brave men, women, and children of Libya with transparency, piety, and devotion.

=== Perspective on Women ===
The network made a pronouncement on International Women's Day. They saw the day, as being a rallying call for liberty, both of Libyan people in general, but also of Libyan women in particular "May the significance of this special day, become an inspiration for a New and Free Libya." This suggests that the future of Libya post Gaddafi might be one where women are not subject to constraint by ultra-conservative clerics. The clerics seeming to hold a quite progressive view on the place of women in society. Author Shelina Janmohammed commented on her popular blog about the pronouncement: 'It's great to see this worldliness in the Ulema, and their recognition of the importance of women and the status and respect that they deserve. It gives me some hope for change.'

=== Religious Duty to Oppose Tyranny ===
At the beginning of the revolution the Network released a call for rebellion by the Libyan population against the Gaddafi regime. This call gained significant attention, with reports coming in both traditional media and also in theological-focused texts. Some authors have been skeptical of this, however in an interview with an Italian news agency an anonymous member of the group pointed to the general consensus around the world against Gaddafi:

The Libyan people have deep faith. Their Muslim religiosity and spirituality fills Libyans with the hope, faith, and charity that represent the very core of their values. Muslim values of justice and fairness, and the importance of overcoming the evils of tyranny do play an important role in the revolt. However, like all human beings Libyans long for freedom. Freedom is equally a religious and humanist value. In Libya it is today cherished by all, whether religious or otherwise.

== Post-Liberation Establishment of the League of Libyan Ulema ==
On the 6th February 2012, in Tripoli members of the Network came together with senior Libyan religious clerics to announce the formation of the League of Libyan Ulema. The league is headed by Sheikh Dr Umar Abdul Hamid al Mawlud and includes a scholarly council of senior Sheikhs.
