= League of Libyan Ulema =

Libyan group of religious scholars

- رابطة علماء ليبيا
- Headquarters: Libya

The League of Libyan Ulema (Arabic: رابطة علماء ليبيا Rabitah al Ulema Līb(i)yā) is a representative group of leading religious scholars from Libya.

== Background ==
The League of Libyan Ulema is an association of Libya's most senior traditional Muslim scholars. It has grown and expanded from its origins as an informal network of Muslim scholars that spontaneously emerged during the early days of the Libyan revolution the Network of Free Ulema - Libya. The group was one of the first to publicly come out against the Gaddafi regime, issuing a fatwa that saw revolution as a religious duty. The League was formally inaugurated on 6 February 2012 in Tripoli. It is headed by Sheikh Dr Umar Abdul Hamid al Mawlud and includes of a scholarly council of senior Sheikhs. The League represents the traditional Azhari line of Asha'ri, Maliki, Junaidi schools, but also includes Ibadi scholars.

== Activities ==
Since its establishment the scholars have held a number of meetings and have issued a document providing a detailed critique on the Dar al-Ifta decree passed by the NTC in Libya. This is a 13-page document which generated considerable attention and discussion in religious and government circles in Libya.
