= Muhammad al-Mahdi as-Senussi =

Senussi cleric and leader (1859–1902)

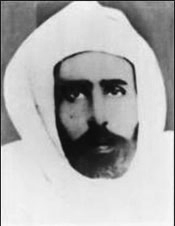
Muhammad Al Mahdi bin Sayyid Muhammad es Senussi

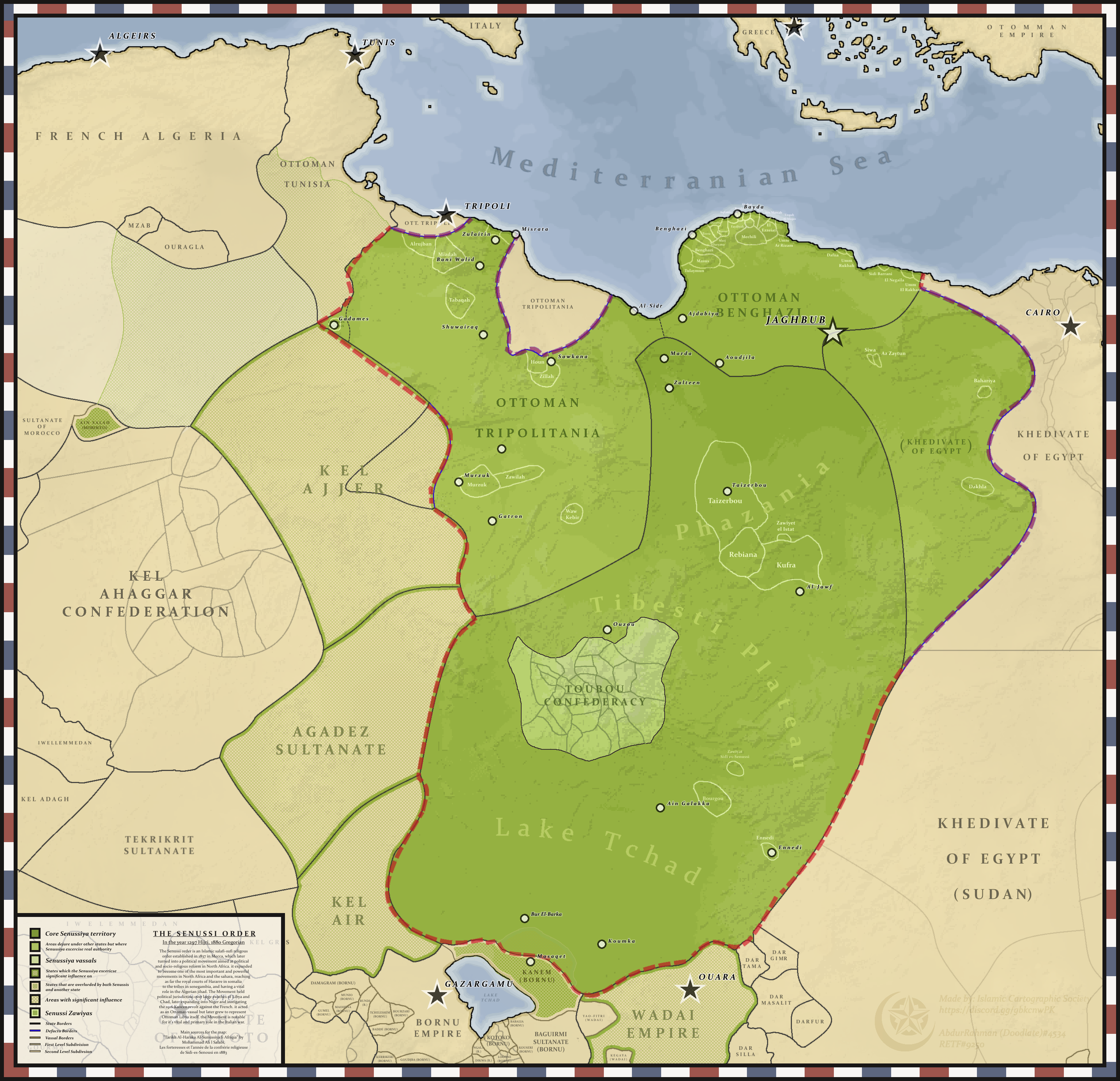
The extent of the Senussi order under Muhammad al-Mahdi as-Senussi

Muhammad Al Mahdi bin Sayyid Muhammad es Senussi (Arabic: محمد المهدي بن سيدي محمد السنوسي), also Sayyid Muhammad ibn Muhammad ibn Muhammad al-Mahdi Ali al-Sanusi, (1844–1902), was the supreme leader of the Sufi Senussi Order between 1859 and his death in 1902 in Libya.

== Early years ==
Muhammad Al-Mahdi was the son of the founder of the Senussi Order, Muhammad ibn Ali as-Senussi. He was born in the town of Bayda in northern Cyrenaica, present day northeastern Libya, He succeeded his father after his death as leader in 1859. Ottoman interference had forced the Senussi to leave coastal Bayda for the desert village of Jaghbub in 1856, where they built an Islamic university, mosque and palace. The later Senussi and Libyan leader King Idris was born here.

== Kufra ==
In 1895 following interference by the Ottomans Al-Mahdi moved again, much further south to the Kufra oasis in the Libyan Desert subregion of the Sahara. Nonetheless, the Ottoman Sultan Abdulhamid II twice sent his aide-de-camp Azmzade Sadik El Mueyyed to meet Sheikh Senussi to cultivate positive relations and counter the West European scramble for Africa (see Azmzade 2021). In Kufra Al-Mahdi founded the village of El Tag (English – "crown"), on a rise above the oasis with a Zaouia and mosque. His tomb is here, making El-Tag a holy place of the Senussi order.

== Senussi order ==
Under the leadership of Al-Mahdi, the Senussi order arrived at the height of their influence and spread, building their Zaouias where water and pasture were available, and spreading south to the Ouaddaï Region and Lake Chad. The Oasis of Kufra became the center of commerce for the desert regions, with caravans coming from the Sahel and the Maghreb. The traders and their caravans took Senussi Islam to remote areas, such as the Darfur and Kanem regions, beyond Saharan North Africa.

== Notes ==
Muhammad al-Mahdi as-Senussi Senussi dynasty Born: 1844
Religious titles
Preceded by Muhammad ibn Ali as-Senussi	Chief of the Senussi order 1859-1902	Succeeded by Ahmed Sharif as-Senussi
