= Ahmed Sharif as-Senussi =

Libyan supreme leader of the Senussi order (1873–1933)

- أحمد الشريف السنوسي
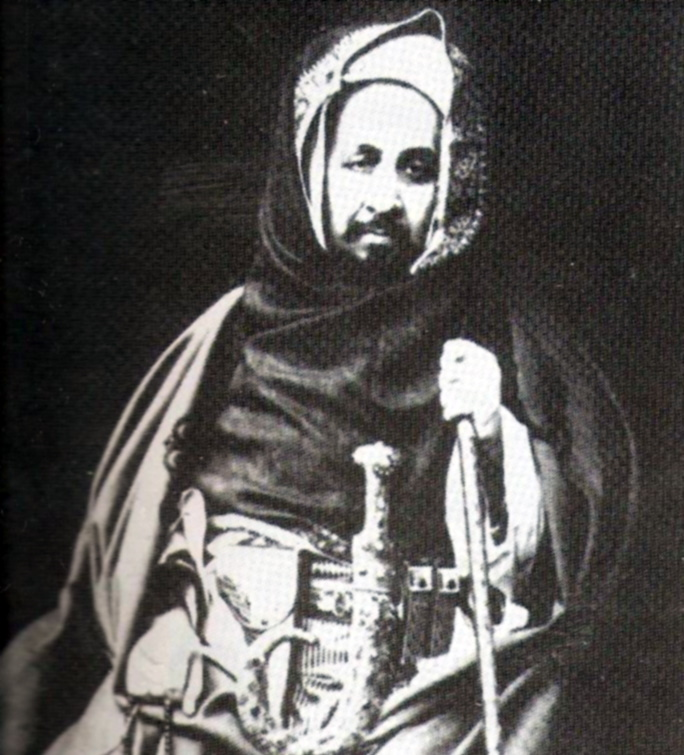
- Sayyid Ahmed ash-Sharif es-Senussi

Supreme leader of the Senussi order
- In office 1902–1933
- Preceded by: Mohammed el Mahdi

Personal details
- Born: 1873 Al Jaghbub, Ottoman Tripolitania, Ottoman Empire (now Libya)
- Died: 10 March 1933 (59–60) Al-Baqi', Medina, Saudi Arabia

Ahmed Sharif as-Senussi (Arabic: أحمد الشريف السنوسي) (1873 – 10 March 1933) was the supreme leader of the Senussi order (1902–1933), although his leadership in the years 1917–1933 could be considered nominal. His daughter, Fatimah el-Sharif was the Queen consort of King Idris I of Libya.

== Early life ==
Ahmed Sharif was the grandson of Muhammad ibn Ali as-Senussi, who founded the Senussi religious order in Cyrenaica in the middle of nineteenth century. In 1895, as-Senussi accompanied his father, Mohammed ash Sharif, and his uncle Muhammed al-Mahdi, then leader of the Senussi order, on their trip from Jaghbub to Kufra, where they remained until 1899, and where Ahmed's father died in 1896.

In 1899 Mohammed el Mahdi and as-Senussi moved from Kufra to Zawiat Guru, in Chad, then to Bergo, aiming to check the French advance in Chad.

== Struggle against the French ==
In 1900, the French forces approached to Kanem, Mohammed el Mahdi assigned his nephew Ahmed to lead the struggle. Between those who fought with Mohammed el Barrani (Ruler of Zawiyat Ber Alali in Kanem), and Omar Al-Mukhtar, the future resistance leader in Libya.

On 1 June 1902, Mohammed el Mahdi died. Because his son Mohammed Idris was only 12 years old, he named, before his death, his nephew Ahmed Sharif to be his successor. Ahmed ash Sharif continued the struggle against the French in Chad which resulted at last into a failure as the French forces took Wadai in 1909 during the Wadai War.

== Struggle against the Italians ==
In October 1911 the Italians invaded Libya beginning the Italo-Turkish War, so as-Senussi suspended the struggle against the French in Chad and concentrated his efforts against the Italians. Sheikh as-Senussi quickly united the tribes of Cyrenaica to jihad against the Italians, forming three battalions of the Senussi. He worked with many Turkish officers against the Italians, such as Enver, Fethi, Mustafa Kemal, Cevat Abbas, Fuat Bulca, and Süleyman Askeri. The first major battle was attended by as-Senussi was Sidi Kraiyem near Derna. The battle itself was a setback to the Italian forces. As-Senussi was awarded the Order of Osmanieh, first class, for his service to the Ottoman Empire. After the Treaty of Ouchy the Senussis continued the struggle. In 1913, Mehmed V sent Sheikh as-Senussi cash, a sword decorated with precious stones, a watch, and a prayer rug.

In his book "The Road to Mecca", Muhammad Asad tells his personal acquittance with as-Senussi and his personal travel to Libya with as-Sanussi's request.

== War with the British in Egypt ==
As-Senussi was one of the first to answer the call of jihad against the Allied Powers on November 14, 1914. With the outbreak of World War I, the Ottoman Empire came into conflict with the British Empire. Italy joined the Allies in May 1915.

In February 1915 the Turks attacked the Suez Canal. At first, Ahmed ash Sharif, already a deputy in North Africa for the Ottoman caliph, was not involved in the conflict against the British. But in November 1915, encouraged by the Turks, the Senussi horsemen under him invaded Egypt and took Sallum. British forces withdrew to Mersa Matruh. In 1915, after four years of hostilities, the Italian forces in Cyrenaica were almost confined to some separated points on the coast.

He was appointed Governor of Tripoli while he was fighting against the British. That title, and being made an honorary “ferik” increased his influence in the region. At one point he was given the title “Regent Sultan of Tripoli and the Benghazi Area." Senussi's uprising was not only a strategic asset for the Ottoman Empire, but also propaganda for the Islamic world, which was seen in the germination of pro-Senussi brochures. Since the Senussi had a great influence over the peoples of many Egyptian oases – Siwa, Kharga, and Dakhla, for example – the British had to take the Senussi threat seriously. In February 1916 the British counterattacked and recaptured Unjela, between Mersa Matruh and Sidi Barrani, and on 14 March they re-took Sallum. Weakened by this defeat, as-Senussi conceded the leadership of the Senussi order to his 26-year-old cousin Mohammed Idris (later King Idris I of Libya), who conducted the negotiations with the British and Italians. Sheikh Ahmed and some tribes did not recognize this agreement and continued the raids. The struggle between the British and the Senussi forces continued intermittently until the end of the war.

On 10–11 August 1918 Enver Pasha ordered for Sheikh Senussi to be extracted from Tripoli. Embarking on a German submarine from the Gulf of Sirte, he was brought to the Austrian port of Pola, where he set off for Istanbul. He was welcomed at Sirkeci Station by the Enver Pasha, the Central Command, and a crowd of African immigrants. On the second day of his arrival in Istanbul on August 31, 1918, Sheikh Senussi girded Mehmed VI with a sword at a ceremony held in Eyüpsultan. During this time, he was given the rank of vizier and pasha and was hosted in Topkapı Palace as a guest of the Sultan.

== Turkish War of Independence ==
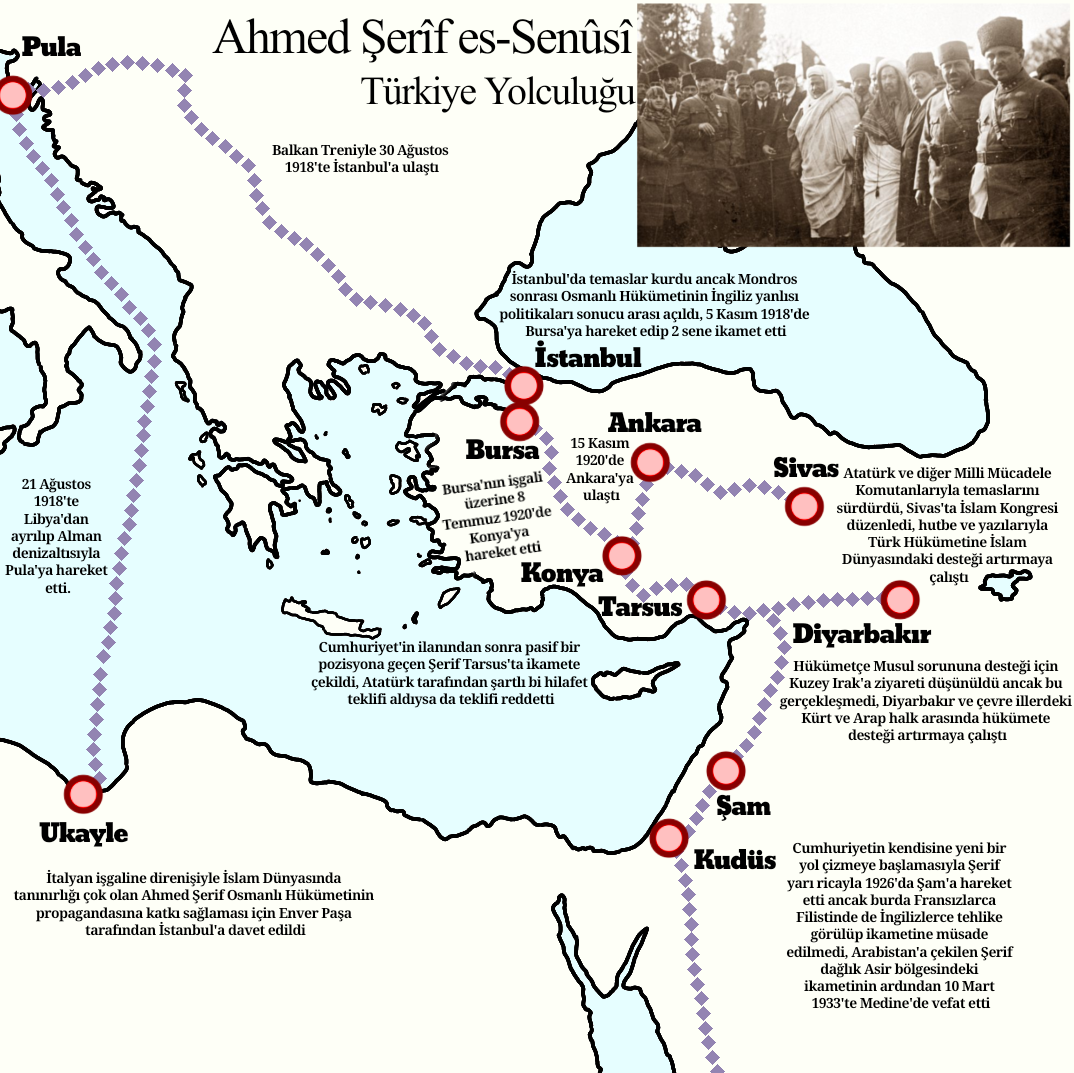
Map of As-Senussi's travels from 1918 to 1933

In November 1918 he was sent to Bursa, where he would stay until July 1920, where he was an advocate for Muslim resistance against Allied imperialism in the remaining Ottoman Empire. He met with Commander of the Western Front National Forces, Ali Fuat Pasha (Cebesoy). He managed to extract himself from the Bursa as Greek forces advanced on the city in the summer of 1920, where he ended up in Konya. There he mediated the Delibaş Rebellion. Sheikh Senussi arrived in Ankara in November 1920, and was welcomed with a banquette, where he and Mustafa Kemal Pasha exchanged flattering speeches to each other. Thereafter he attended the Islamic Congress of Sivas, an attempt to coordinate Muslim nationalist and anti-colonialist movements around the world.

In late 1920, pro-Turkish tribes and communities in Iraq revolted, where they decided that Burhanettin Efendi, son of Abdul Hamid II, would be a candidate for the Iraqi throne, and Sheikh Senussi would be regent until the prince's arrival. The Sheikh was thus sent to Diyarbakır in case the Iraqi uprising turned for the better. Senussi reiterated his support for Mustafa Kemal and the National Struggle movement with the speeches given in Konya, Eskişehir, Sivas, Malatya, Diyarbakır, Antep, Urfa and Mardin. The Nationalists leaders used his influence to gain support among the Arab, Kurdish, and Turkish tribes in Northern Iraq; and he became an important spokesperson of Ankara in the region. He helped to organize pro-Turkish Arab militia groups in Syria and in Iraq.

Mustafa Kemal granted Sheikh Senussi large plot of land in Adana, a few houses, and the transferal of his family about one hundred. However, a house could not be provided for him there, so he went to Tarsus. He sent a telegram to Mustafa Kemal, congratulated him for abolishing the sultanate.

== Later life ==
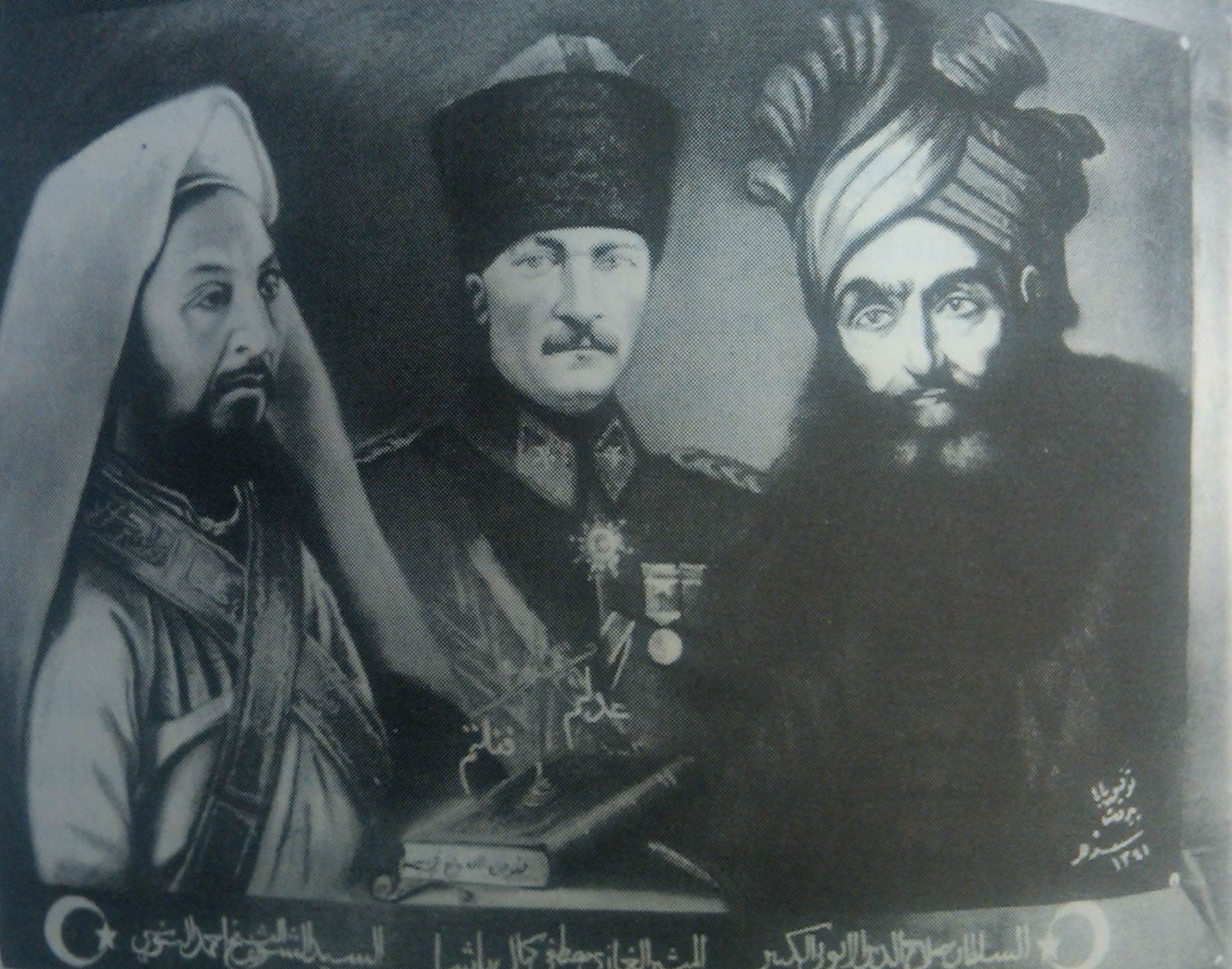
A postcard depicting Mustafa Kemal as a Muslim hero, with Ahmed Sharif as-Senussi (left) and Saladin (right)

Senussi arrived in Ankara in early 1923 to meet with Ghazi Mustafa Kemal, hoping to get his blessings and support for an uprising against the Italians in Tripoli and Benghazi, which he hoped to lead by getting himself back to Libya. He was visited by many deputies in the Grand National Assembly, including Rauf Orbay and Ali Fuad Cebesoy, who were present at the banquet given by the Afghan Ambassador Ahmed Khan. Sheikh Sanusi wished for the Ankara Government to materially and spiritually succeed so as to be a leader for the Muslim world.

He welcomed Mustafa Kemal during his visits to Adana and Tarsus in March 1923. Mustafa Kemal presented Sheikh Ahmed Sanusi with an amber rosary and visited him at his home in Camii Cedit. Sanusi's presence in Turkey and his hope to return to Tripoli soured Turkish-Italian dialogue during the Lausanne negotiations and afterwards. Italian representatives were that claims of a committee connected to Sheikh Sanusi which had been established in Istanbul to support the ongoing uprising in Italian Libya were false. The Italians were concerned with him finding his way back to Libya to lead a Libyan resistance, but the Ankara Government informed the Italians that the Sheikh was free to travel.

Before abolishing the Ottoman Caliphate, Kemal reportedly offered the caliphate to Sharif as-Senussi, on the condition that he reside outside Turkey; Senussi declined the offer and confirmed his support for Abdulmejid II.

After leaving Turkey on 30 October 1924, Sheikh Sanusi went to Damascus and stayed there for a while. The French were disturbed by the interest Syrian Muslims held towards him, and pressured him to leave the mandate. The British were similarly cautious of his presence in Palestine, and he was forced to go to Hejaz. He lived there in Abdulaziz Ibn Saud's favor, dying in Medina on March 10, 1933.

== Notes ==
Ahmed Sharif as-Senussi Senussi dynasty Born: 1875
Religious titles
Preceded by Muhammad al-Mahdi as-Senussi	Chief of the Senussi order 1902–1916	Succeeded by Idris of Libya
