= Sanusiyya =

Muslim Sufi order and clan in Libya

Sanusi order السنوسية
- The traditional banner of the Sanusi order, later used as inspiration of the flag of Cyrenaica and eventually incorporated into the flag of Libya
- Formation: 1837; 189 years ago, Mecca
- Type: Sufi order
- Headquarters: Libya
- Key people: Muhammad ibn Ali al-Sanusi (founder); Mohammed El Senussi (current head)

The Sanusi order or Sanusiyyah (Arabic: السنوسية, romanized: as-Sanūssiyya) are a politically conservative Sufi order (tariqa) of Sunni Islam in Libya and North Africa. It was founded in Mecca in 1837 by the Muslim theologian Muhammad ibn Ali al-Sanusi (the "Grand Sanusi")

The Sanusi order seek "spiritual identification" with the Prophet Muhammad through the study and emulation of his actions, life and words. The order does not tolerate fanaticism and forbids the use of stimulants as well as living voluntarily in poverty, dependent on charity. Rather they are required to earn a living through work and are to eat and dress within the limits of fiqh.

During World War I the Senusi order fought against both Italy and Britain. During World War II, the order provided support to the British Eighth Army in North Africa against Nazi and Fascist Italian forces. The founder's grandson became King Idris I of Libya in 1951. The 1969 Libyan revolution led by Muammar Gaddafi overthrew him, ending the Libyan monarchy. The movement remained active despite persecution by Gaddafi's government, and its cultural legacy continues to this day in Libya, centered on Cyrenaica.

== History ==
=== Beginnings: 1787–1859 ===
The Sanusi order has been historically closed to outsiders with reports of their beliefs and practices varying immensely. Though it is possible to gain some insight from the lives of the Sanusi sheikhs further details are difficult to obtain.

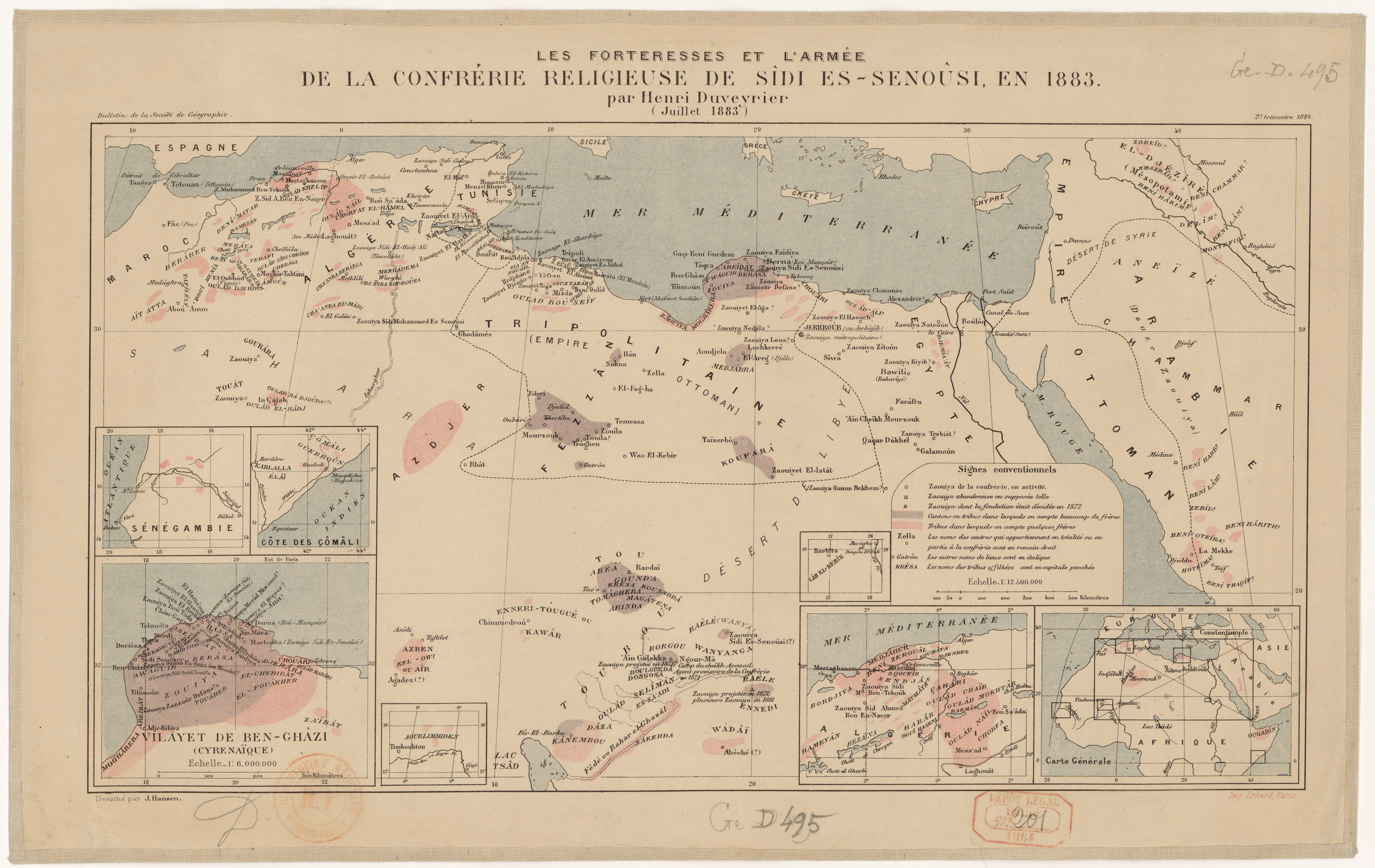
The fortresses and army of religious brotherhood of Muhammad ibn Ali al-Sanusi, 1883

Muhammad ibn Ali al-Sanusi (1787–1859), the founder of the order, was born in Algeria near Mostaganem and was named Al-Sanusi after a venerated Muslim teacher. He was a member of the Awlad Sidi Abdalla tribe and a Sharif. In addition to Islamic sciences, Al-Sanusi learned science and chivalry in his upbringing. He studied at the University of al-Qarawiyyin in Fez, then traveled in the Sahara, preaching a purifying reform of the faith in Tunisia and Tripoli, gaining many adherents. Ai-Sanusi then moved to Cairo to study at Al-Azhar University in 1824.

Al-Sanusi was critical of the government of the Ottoman Viceroy Muhammad Ali of Egypt. The pious scholar was also forceful in his criticism of the Egyptian Ulama and was opposed by the Ulama. He traveled from Egypt to Mecca, and spent 15 years as a student and teacher until 1843. In Mecca, Al-Sanusi joined the Qadiri Order, a renowned Sufi order. Al-Sanusi acquired several of his ideas through his education from 1825 to 1827/28. Upon the death of his tutor Ahmad ibn Idris al-Fasi, the Qadiriyya divided into two branches, the Khatmiyya and the Sanusi led by al-Sanusi.

In 1835 he founded his first monastery or zawiya, at Abu Qubays located near Mecca. In 1843 the Wahhabis forced him to leave the areaand he returned to Libya. In the mountains near Sidi Rafaa' (Bayda) he built the Zawiya Bayda "White Monastery". There he was supported by the local tribes and the Sultan of Wadai, with connections across the Maghreb.

Initially, Bedouins had shown no interest in the ecstatic practices of the Sufis that were gaining adherents in the towns, but they were attracted in great numbers to the Sanusi order. The relative austerity of the Sanusi message was particularly suited to the character of the Cyrenaican Bedouins.

In 1855, the Sanusi order moved farther from direct Ottoman surveillance to Jaghbub, a small oasis some 30 miles northwest of Siwa. He died in 1860, leaving two sons, Mohammed Sherif (1844–95) and Muhammed al-Mahdi, who succeeded him.

=== Developments since 1859 ===
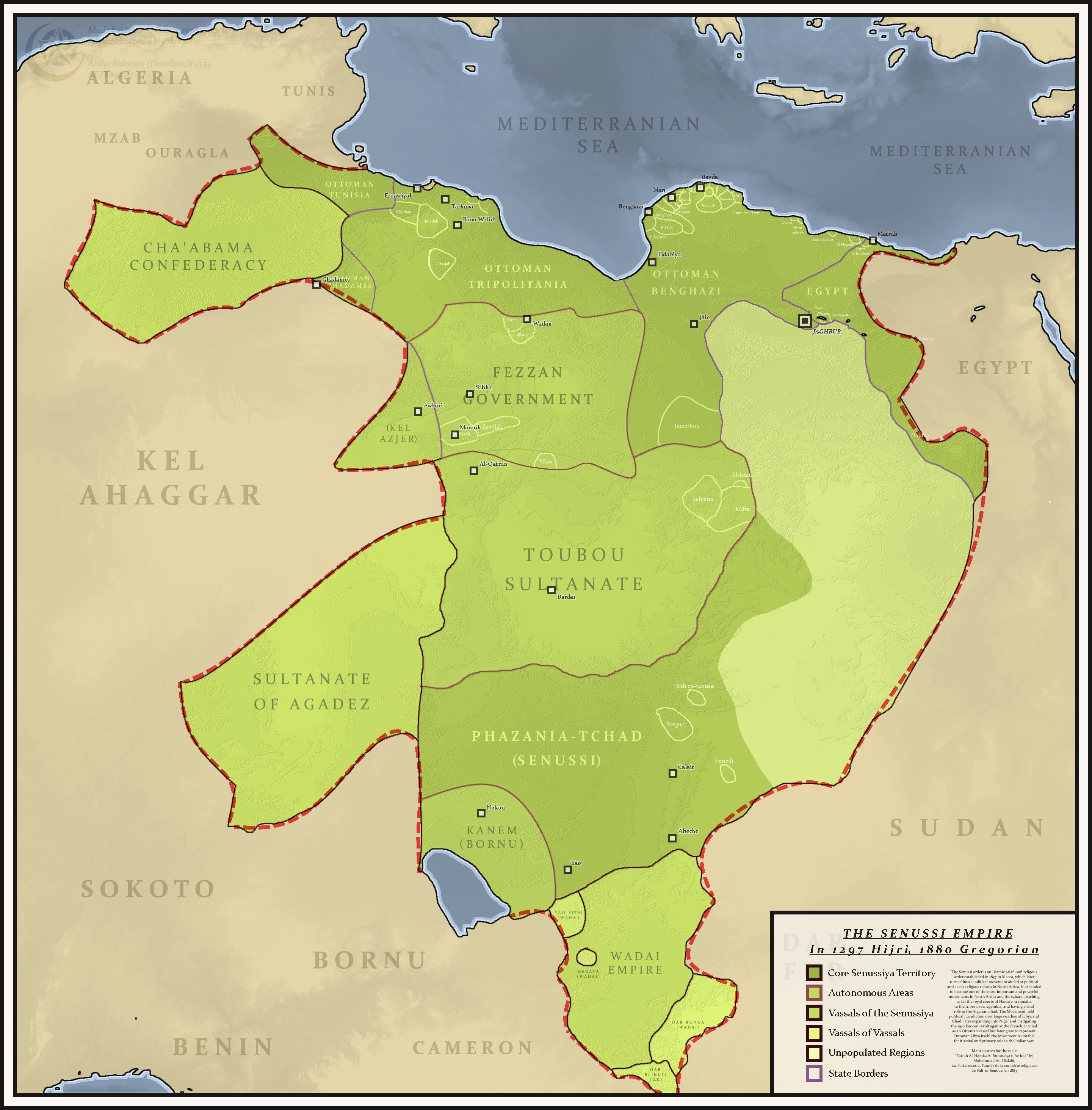
Map showing the empire of the Senussi order in 1880 (1297 in the Hijri calendar)

Muhammad al-Mahdi ibn Muhammad al-Sanusi (1845 – 30 May 1902) was fourteen when his father died, after which he was placed under the care of his father's friends Amran, Rifi, and others. At age 18, he left their care and moved to Fez to further his knowledge of the Qur'an and Sufism.

The successors to the sultan of Abu Qubays, Sultans Ali (1858–74) and Yusef (1874–98), continued to support the Sanusi. Under al-Mahdi, the zawiyas of the order extended to Fez, Damascus, Istanbul, and India. In the Hejaz, members of the order were numerous. In most of these countries, the Sanusi wielded no more political power than other Muslim fraternities, but in the eastern Sahara and central Sudan, things were different. Muhammed al-Mahdi had the authority of a sovereign in a vast but almost empty desert. The string of oases leading from Siwa to Kufra and Borkou were cultivated by the Sanusi order, and trade with Tripoli and Benghazi was encouraged.

Although named "al-Mahdi" by his father, Muhammad never claimed to be the actual Mahdi. However, he was regarded as such by some of his followers. When Muhammad Ahmad proclaimed himself the Mahdi in 1881, Muhammad Idris decided to have nothing to do with him. Although Muhammad Ahmed wrote twice asking him to become one of his four great caliphs, he received no reply.

In 1890, the Ansar forces of Muhammad Ahmad al-Mahdi advancing from Darfur were stopped on the frontier of the Wadai Empire, Sultan Yusuf proving firm in his adherence to the Senussi teachings.

Muhammed al-Mahdi's growing fame made the Ottoman regime uneasy and drew unwelcome attention. In most of Tripoli and Benghazi his authority was greater than that of the Ottoman governors. In 1889 the sheikh was visited at Jaghbub by the pasha of Benghazi accompanied by Ottoman troops. This event showed the sheik the possibility of danger and led him to move his headquarters to Jof in the oases of Kufra in 1894, a place sufficiently remote to secure him from a sudden attack.

The Sanusi order had Somali contacts in Berbera and consistently tried to rally Somalis to join their movement alongside their rivals, the Mahdists. Sultan Nur Ahmed Aman of the Habr Yunis, himself a learned sheikh, regularly received Sanusi emissaries and housed them. Sultan Nur would go on to play a critical role in the subsequent Somali Dervish Movement starting in 1899.

By this time a new danger to Sanusi territories had arisen from the French colonial empire, who were advancing from the French Congo towards the western and southern borders of the Wadai Empire. The Senussi kept them from advancing north of Chad.

=== The Zawiya lodges system ===
The Sanusi established system of lodges called "zawiya" in Sudan, Chad, Egypt and the Arabian Peninsula. The lodges would teach economics, musket training, Islamic theology (Aqidah) and subsequently the Arabic language. The lodges would host diplomatic missions of Libyan tribes, which would be in certain cases involved hundreds of visitors at times.

The Sanusi have held high value and strict teaching for Sunnah and the hadith collection books Sahih al-Bukhari and Sahih Muslim.

Judith Scheele in her book characterized the Sanusi lodge system in Sub-Saharan Africa as agricultural colonialism, although likely linked to the zuwayya who owned slaves. On the contrary Muhammad Ali al-Sallabi countered that the locals agreed to work at Sanusi lodges on a voluntarily basis.

=== Leadership of Ahmed Sharif as-Senussi ===
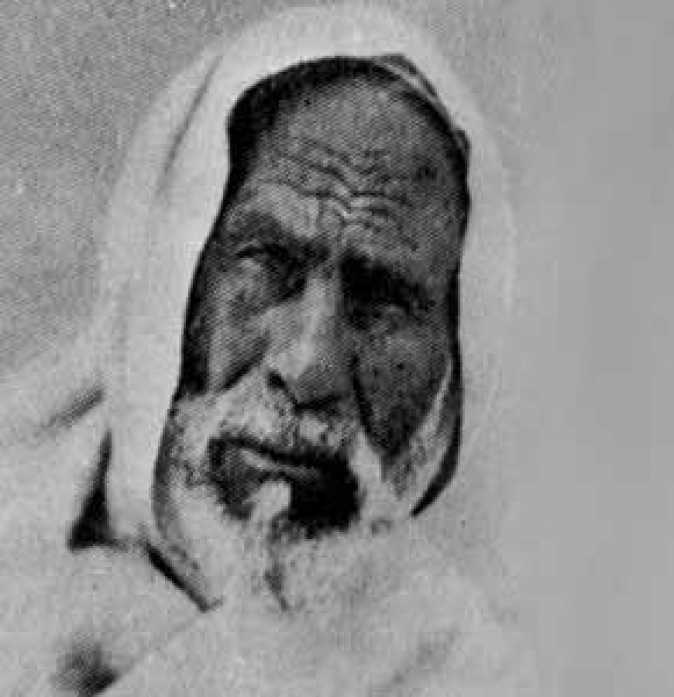
Omar Mukhtar became the most trusted chief under Sayyid Ahmed Sharif

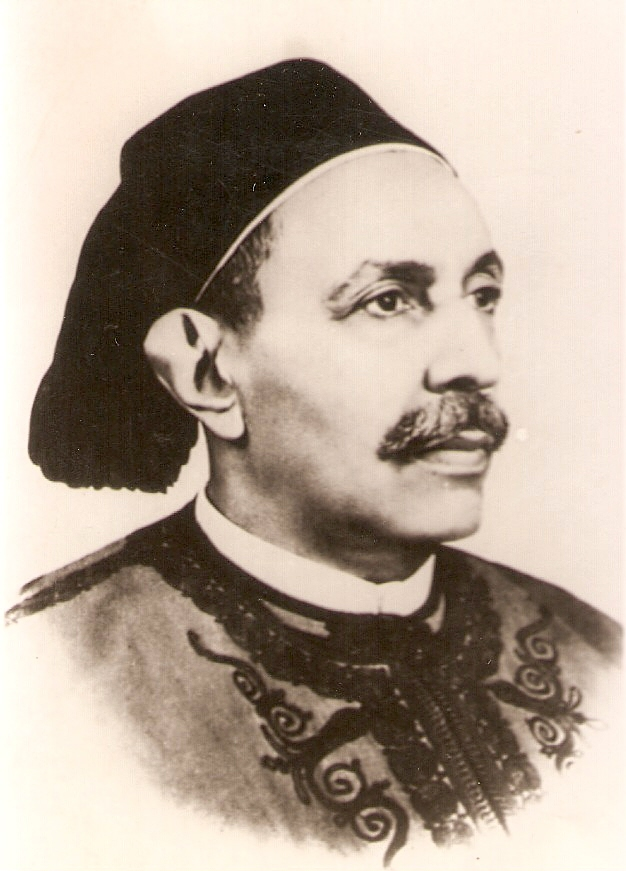
Idris of Libya (Sidi Muhammad Idris al-Mahdi al-Senussi), king 1951–1969

In 1902, Muhammad Idris died and was succeeded by his nephew, Ahmed Sharif as-Senussi, but his adherents in the deserts bordering Egypt maintained for years that Muhammad was not dead. The new head of the Sanusi order maintained the friendly relations of his predecessors with Sultan Dud Murra of Wadai, governing the order as regent for his young cousin, Muhammad Idris II, the future King Idris of Libya, who signed the 1917 Treaty of Acroma that ceded control of Libya from the Kingdom of Italy and was later recognized by them as Emir of Cyrenaica on October 25, 1920.

The Sanusi order, encouraged by the German and Ottoman Empires, played a minor part in the World War I, during the Senussi campaign, utilising guerrilla warfare against the Italian colonization of Libya and the British in Egypt from November 1915 until February 1917, led by Sayyid Ahmed, and in the Sudan from March to December 1916, led by Ali Dinar, the Sultan of Darfur. In 1916, the British sent an expeditionary force against them known as the Senussi Campaign led by Major General William Peyton. According to Wavell and McGuirk, Western Force was first led by General Wallace and later by General Hodgson.

Italy took Libya from the Ottomans in the Italo-Turkish War of 1911. In 1922, Italian Fascist leader Benito Mussolini launched his infamous Riconquista of Libya — the Roman Empire having done the original conquering 2000 years before. The Sanusi order led the resistance and Italians closed khanqahs, arrested sheikhs, and confiscated mosques and their land. The resistance was led by Omar Mukhtar who used his knowledge of desert warfare and guerrilla tactics to resist Italian colonization. After his death the Senussi resistance faded, and they were forced to renounce their land for compensation. Overall, Libyans fought the Italians until 1943, with 250,000–300,000 of them dying in the process.

=== Idris of Libya ===
From 1917 to his death, in 1933, Ahmed Sharif as-Senussi's leadership was mostly nominal. Idris of Libya, a grandson of Muhammad ibn Ali al-Sanusi, the Grand Senussi, replaced Ahmed as effective leader of the Order in 1917 and went on to play a key role as the Sanusi leader who brought the Libyan tribes together into a unified Libyan nation.

Idris established a tacit alliance with the British, which led to two agreements with the Italian rulers, one of which brought most of inland Cyrenaica under the de facto control of the Senussis. The resulting Accord of al-Rajma, consolidated through further negotiations with the Italians, earned Idris the title of Emir of Cyrenaica, albeit new tensions which compromised that delicate balance emerged shortly after.

Soon Cyrenaica became the stronghold of the Libyan and Sanusi resistance to the Italian rulers. In 1922, Idris went into exile in Egypt, as the Italian response to the Libyan resistance grew increasingly violent.

During the Second World War, Sanusi groups led by Idris formally allied themselves with the British Eighth Army in North Africa against the German and Italian forces. Ultimately, the Sanusi order proved decisive in the British defeat of both Italy and Germany in North Africa in 1943. The Libyans fought the Italians until 1943, with an estimated 250,000 to 300,000 of them dying in the process.

As historian Ali Abdullah Ahmida remarked, the Sanusi order was able to transcend "ethnic and local tribal identification", and therefore had a unifying influence on the Libyans fighting the Italian occupiers. A well-known hero of the Libyan resistance and an ally of Idris, Omar Mukhtar, was a prominent member of the Sanusi order and a Sufi teacher whom the Italians executed in 1931.

After the end of the war in 1945, the Western powers pushed for Idris, still leader of the Sanusi order, to be the leader of a new unified Libya. When the country achieved independence under the aegis of the United Nations in 1951, Idris became its king, and Fatimah his Queen consort.

Although it was instrumental in his accession to power, according to the Islamic scholar Mohammed Ayoob, Idris used Islam "as a shield to counter pressures generated by the more progressive circles in North Africa, especially from Egypt."

Resistance towards Idris' rule began to build in 1965 due to a combination of factors: the discovery of oil in the region, government corruption and ineptness, and Arab nationalism. On September 1, 1969, a military coup led by Muammar Gaddafi marked the end of Idris' reign. The king was toppled while he was receiving medical treatment in Turkey. From there he fled to Greece and then Egypt, where he died in exile in 1983. Meanwhile, a republic was proclaimed, and Idris was sentenced to death in absentia in November 1971 by the Libyan People's Court.

In August 1969, Idris issued a letter of abdication designating his nephew Hassan as-Senussi as his successor. The letter was to be effective on September 2, but the coup preceded Idris' formal abdication. King Idris' nephew and Crown Prince Hasan as-Senussi, who had been designated Regent when Idris left Libya to seek medical treatment in 1969, became the successor to the leadership of the Sanusi order.

Many Libyans continue to regard Idris with great affection, referring to him as the "Sufi King". In May 2013, Idris and Omar Mukhtar were commemorated for their role as Sanusi leaders and key players in Libya's independence in a celebration of the 50th anniversary of the foundation of the African Union in Addis Ababa.

=== Developments since 1969 ===
Gaddafi banned the Sanusi order, forced the Sanusi circles underground, and systematically persecuted prominent Sanusi figures, in an effort to remove Sufi symbols and to silence voices of the Sanusi tradition from Libya's public life. The remaining Sanusi tribes were severely restricted in their actions by the revolutionary government, which also appointed a supervisor for their properties.

Ironically, Omar Mukhtar became one of Gaddafi's most inspiring figures, whose speeches he frequently quoted, and whose image he often exhibited in official occasions. In 1984, Libya's distinguished Senussi University was closed by Gaddafi's order, although international scholars continued to visit the country until the beginning of the civil war to study the Sanusi history and legacy. In fact, evidence of the Sanusi presence and activism was recorded throughout the 1980s. Vocal anti-Gaddafi resistance emerged among the former Sanusi tribes in Cyrenaica in the 1990s, which Gaddafi suppressed with his troops.

In 1992, Crown Prince Hassan as-Senussi died. The leadership of the Sanusi order passed to his second son, Mohammed El Senussi, whom Hassan had appointed as his successor to the throne of Libya.

== Legacy ==
The Sufi heritage and spirit remains prominent today, and its sentiment and symbols have inspired many during the 2011 Libyan revolution. The image of Omar Mukhtar and his popular quote "We win or we die" resonated in Tripoli and in the country as Libyans rose up to oust Gaddafi. In July 2011 The Globe and Mail contributor Graeme Smith reported that one of the anti-Gaddafi brigades took the name of "Omar Mukhtar Brigade".

Stephen Schwarz, executive director of the Center for Islamic Pluralism, reflected on the "Sufi foundation" of Libya's revolution in his August 2011 piece for the Huffington Post. Schwarz observed that Libya continued to stand "as one of the distinguished centers of a Sufism opposed both to unquestioning acceptance of Islamic law and to scriptural absolutism, and dedicated to freedom and progress." He wrote: "With the fall of the dictatorship, it will now be necessary to analyze whether and how Libya's Sufi past can positively influence its future."

In August 2012, hardliner Salafi extremists attacked and destroyed the shrine of al-Shaab al-Dahmani, a Sufi saint, in Tripoli. The tombs of Sufi scholars were systematically targeted by extremists as well across the country.

The sustained attacks were consistently denounced by Sufi scholars as well as by the League of Libyan Ulema, a group of leading Libyan religious scholars, calling the population to protect the religious and historical sites by force and urging the authorities to intervene in order to avoid further escalations of violence and new attacks by Salafi groups.

== List of leaders ==
- Muhammad ibn Ali al-Sanusi (1843–1859)
- Muhammad al-Mahdi as-Senussi (1859–1902)
- Ahmed Sharif as-Senussi (1902–1916; died 1933)
- Idris of Libya (1916–1969; died 1983)
- Hassan as-Senussi (1969–1992)
- Mohammed El Senussi (1992–present)

== See also ==
- List of Sufi orders
- Ahmad ibn Idris al-Fasi
- Abdullah Senussi
- Ahmed al-Senussi
- Charles de Foucauld

== Sources ==
- Azmzade Sadik El Mueyyed, Journey in the Grand Sahara of Africa (1897), republished in Azmzade, Gokkent, Senusi et al. in Journey in the Grand Sahara of Africa and Through Time (2021)
- E. E. Evans-Pritchard, The Sanusi of Cyrenaica (1949, repr. 1963)
- N. A. Ziadeh, Sanusiyah (1958, repr. 1983).
- Bianci, Steven, Libya: Current Issues and Historical Background New York: Nova Science Publishers, 2003
- L. Rinn, Marabouts et Khouan, a good historical account up to the year 1884
- O. Depont and X. Coppolani, Les Confréries religieuses musulmanes (Algiers, 1897)
- Si Mohammed el Hechaish, Chez les Senoussia et les Touareg, in "L'Expansion col. française" for 1900 and the "Revue de Paris" for 1901. These are translations from the Arabic of an educated Muslim who visited the chief Senussite centres. An obituary notice of Senussi el Mahdi by the same writer appeared in the Arab journal El Hadira of Tunis, Sept. 2, 1902; a condensation of this article appears in the "Bull. du Com. de l'Afriue française" for 1902; "Les Senoussia", an anonymous contribution to the April supplement of the same volume, is a judicious summary of events, a short bibliography being added; Capt. Julien, in "Le Dar Ouadai" published in the same Bulletin (vol. for 1904), traces the connection between Wadai and the Senussi.
- L. G. Binger, in Le Péril de l'Islam in the 1906 volume of the Bulletin, discusses the position and prospects of the Senussite and other Islamic sects in North Africa. Von Grunau, in "Verhandlungen der Gesellschaft für Erdkunde" for 1899, gives an account of his visit to Siwa.
- M. G. E. Bowman–Manifold, An Outline of the Egyptian and Palestine Campaigns, 1914 to 1918 2nd Edition (Chatham: The Institution of Royal Engineers, W. & J. Mackay & Co Ltd, 1923)
- Russell McGuirk The Sanusi's Little War The Amazing Story of a Forgotten Conflict in the Western Desert, 1915–1917 (London, Arabian Publishing: 2007)
- Field Marshal Earl Wavell, The Palestine Campaigns 3rd Edition thirteenth Printing; Series: A Short History of the British Army 4th Edition by Major E. W. Sheppard (London: Constable & Co., 1968)
- Sir F. R. Wingate, in Mahdiism and the Egyptian Sudan (London, 1891) narrates the efforts made by the Mahdi Mahommed Ahmed to obtain the support of the Senussi.
- Sir W. Wallace, in his report to the Colonial Office on Northern Nigeria for 1906–1907, deals with Senussiism in that country.
- H. Duveyrier, La Confrérie musulmane de Sidi Mohammed ben Ali es Senoûssi (Paris, 1884), a book containing much exaggeration.
- A. Silva White, From Sphinx to Oracle (London, 1898), which, while repeating the extreme views of Duveyrier, contains useful information.
