= Hasan as-Senussi =

King of Libya (1928–1992)

- Crown Prince of Libya
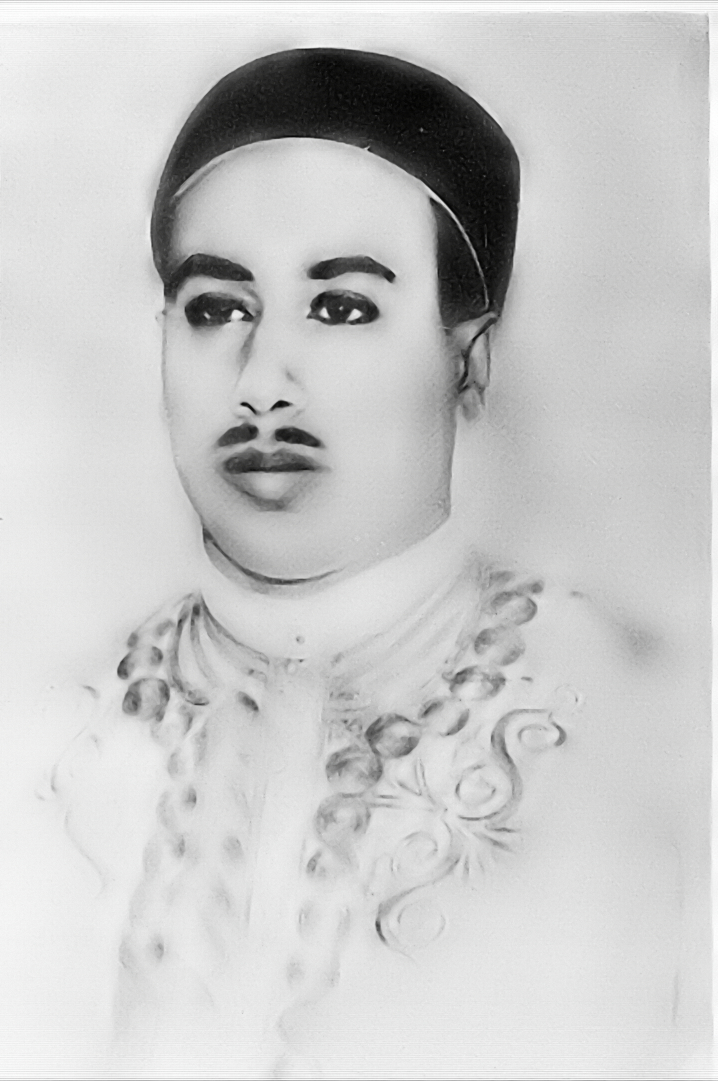

Head of the Libyan royal family
- Tenure: 2 September 1969 – 28 April 1992
- Predecessor: Idris I
- Successor: Prince Muhammad
- Born: August 1928; Benghazi, Italian Cyrenaica
- Died: 28 April 1992 (aged 63); Westminster, London, England
- Burial: Jannat al-Baqi, Medina, Saudi Arabia
- Spouse: Sheikha Fawzia bint Tahir
- Issue: Mohammed El Senussi
- House: Senussi
- Father: Prince Muhammad al-Rida
- Mother: Imbaraika al-Fallatiyya

Sayyid Hasan ar-Rida al-Mahdi as-Senussi (August 1928 – 28 April 1992) was the Crown Prince of the Kingdom of Libya from 1956 to 1969, when the Libyan coup d'état resulted in the monarchy being abolished.

== Biography ==
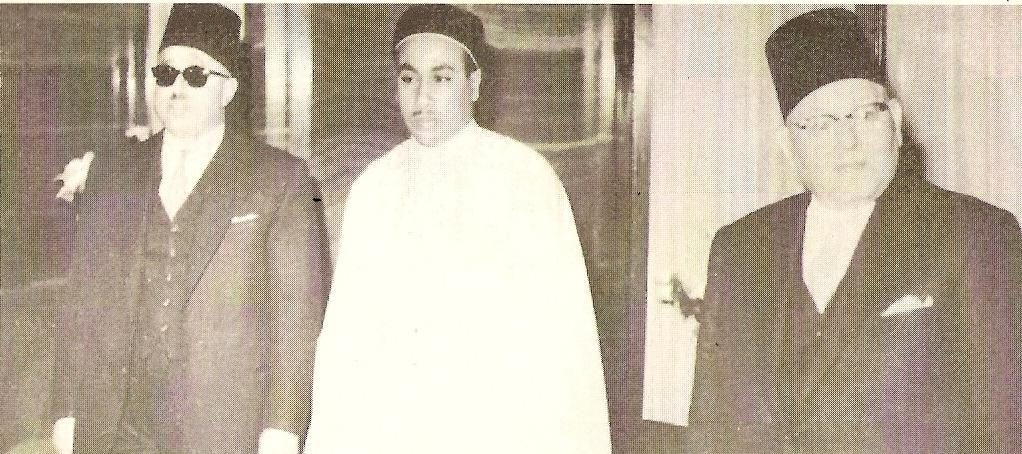
Crown Prince Hasan (centre), to the left prime minister Abdul Majid Kubar and Taher Bakeer, Governor of Tripolitania and father-in-law.

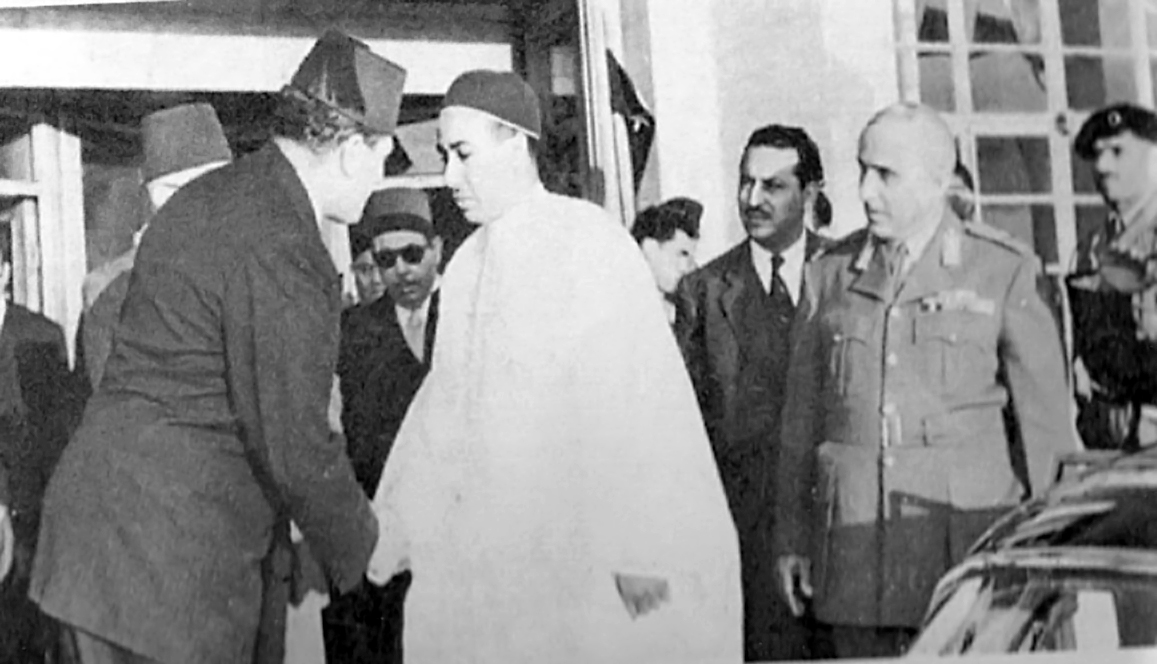
Crown Prince Hasan shaking hands with Hussein Maziq, governor of Cyrenaica. Wanis al-Qaddafi and General Mahmud Buguaitin are standing behind the prince.

Hasan was born in 1928 the fifth son of Muhammad ar-Ride as-Senussi (1890–1955, the brother of the then emir of Cyrenaica, Idris of Libya) and his tenth wife Imbaraika al-Fallatiyya. He was educated at Al-Taj, Kufra and Al-Azhar University in Cairo, Egypt.

On 24 December 1951, Libya became independent. Following the death of his father, he was nominated crown prince by his uncle King Idris I on 26 October 1956.

=== 1969 revolution ===
The events of September 1969 proved to be pivotal both for Crown Prince Hasan and for Libya. As Crown Prince, Hasan was first in line to succeed to the Libyan throne. The ailing King Idris presented a signed document on 4 August 1969 to the President of the Libyan Senate, whereby Idris was to abdicate in favour of the Crown Prince. The instrument of abdication specified 2 September, the date when the King undertook formally to step down. Indeed, the Crown Prince was already exercising regal powers in the name of King Idris, in the run up to 2 September. However, on 1 September, while Idris was out of the country undergoing medical treatment, a group of Libyan army officers, among them Colonel Muammar al-Gaddafi, staged a rebellion and announced that King Idris was deposed. Since King Idris I was unable to complete his reign as envisaged by his instrument of abdication, Hasan never actually became King. His legacy, however, was in his role of Crown Prince, exercised between 1956 and 1969, towards the end of which he was the de facto ruler of Libya. As Crown Prince, he repeatedly undertook official trips abroad, notably to negotiate the purchase of U.S.-built jet fighters from the Kennedy Administration for the Libyan Air Force.

=== House arrest and death ===
Following the revolution, Hasan was kept under house arrest in Libya, tried in the Libyan People's Court and sentenced to three years in prison in November 1971.

In 1984, the Crown Prince and his family were thrown out of their house, which was then burnt down, and forced to move into cabins on one of Tripoli's public beaches. It was in these cabins that the Crown Prince suffered a stroke in 1986. In 1988, the Crown Prince was permitted by Colonel Gaddafi to travel for medical treatment to London, where he died in 1992. The Crown Prince was buried beside his uncle King Idris at Al-Baqi' Cemetery, Medina, Saudi Arabia.

Prior to his death in 1992, he appointed his second son, Mohammed El Senussi (born 1962), to succeed him as head of the Royal House of Libya.

Hasan as-Senussi Senussi dynasty Born: 1928 Died: 28 April 1992
Titles in pretence
Preceded by King Idris I	— TITULAR — King of Libya; 2 September 1969 – 28 April 1992; Reason for succession failure: Monarchy abolished in 1969	Succeeded by Prince Muhammad
Religious titles
Preceded by King Idris I	Chief of the Senussi order 2 September 1969 – 28 April 1992	Succeeded by Prince Muhammad
