= Muhammad ibn Ali al-Sanusi =

- Founder of the Sanusi order
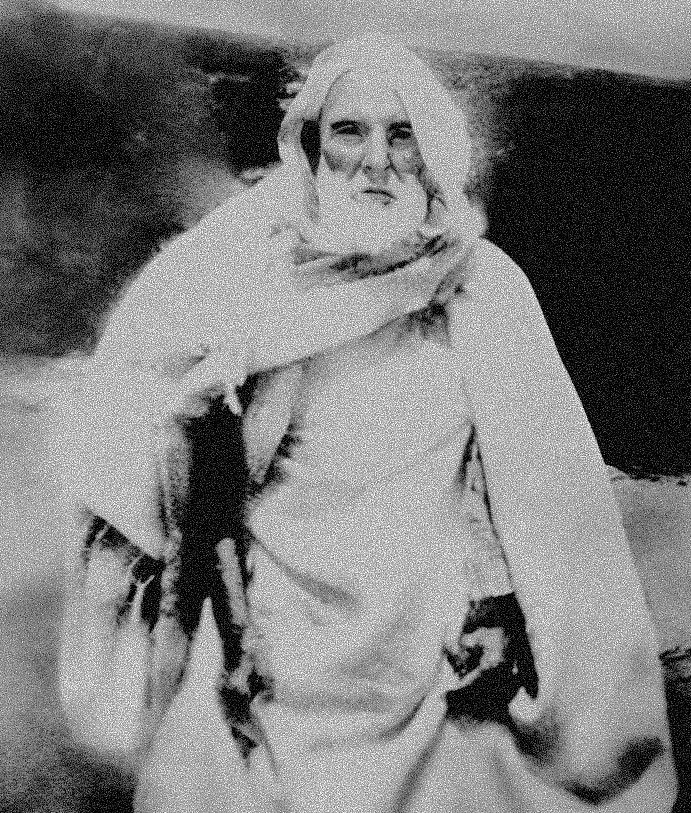
- al-Sanusi in the 1850s
- Born: 22 December 1787; Mostaganem, Regency of Algiers
- Died: 2 September 1859 (aged 71); Jaghbub, Libya, Ottoman Tripolitania
- Issue: Muhammad al-Mahdi as-Senussi
- Father: Ali al-Sanusi
- Religion: Islam

Muhammad ibn Ali al-Sanusi (Arabic: محمد بن علي السنوسي; full name Muḥammad ibn ʿAlī al-Sanūsī al-Mujāhirī al-Ḥasanī al-Idrīsī; 1787 or 1791–1859), also known as Sīdī Muḥammad al-Sanūsī, was an Algerian Muslim theologian, religious leader, and mystic who founded the Sanūsīya order in 1837. He sought to combine orthodox Islamic practice with mystical attainment, placing particular emphasis on dhikr, and the movement he founded subsequently became an important religious and political force in North Africa.

== Life and teachings ==
Al-Sanusi was born at al-Wasita near Mostaganem, Algeria, in 1787. He belonged to the Algerian Walad Sidi Abdallah tribe and claimed descent from the Islamic prophet Muhammad. He was named al-Sanusi after Muhammad ibn Yusuf al-Sanusi, a venerated Muslim teacher associated with Tlemcen in the 13th century.

After spending a period in Mecca, al-Sanusi returned to North Africa and established himself at Jaghbub, where freed slaves were welcomed into his community. He had been initiated into Qādiriyya mysticism and sought to harmonize orthodox religious practice with mystical attainment, giving particular prominence to dhikr. In 1837 he founded the Sanūsīya, or Sanusi order.

== Legacy ==
The Sanusi movement developed into a militant mystical movement of considerable importance in North Africa and later contributed to Libya's struggle for independence from Italy, which culminated in freedom on 10 February 1947. Al-Sanusi's grandson, Idris, subsequently became king of Libya and reigned from 1951 until 1969.

== Sources ==
- S. Khuda Bukhsh, Studies Indian and Islamic, Routledge 2001, p. 28 ISBN 0-415-24464-1 (retrieved 26-09-2011)

Muhammad ibn Ali al-Sanusi Senussi dynasty Born: 1787
Religious titles
Preceded by None	Chief of the Senussi order 1843–1859	Succeeded by Muhammad al-Mahdi as-Senussi
