= List of Libyans =

This is a list of notable people from Libya and of Libyan ancestry.

== Artists ==
=== Writers (including poets) ===
- Callimachus, ancient poet and librarian
- Philostephanus, Hellenistic writer
- Eugammon of Cyrene, flourished 567/6 BC.
- Sextus Julius Africanus
- Ahmed Rafiq Almhadoui (1898–1961), poet
- Khadījah Jahamī
- Saddeka Arebi (died 2007), author and anthropologist
- Ibrahim Al-Koni (born 1948)
- Hisham Matar (born 1970)
- Heba Shibani
- Ahmed Fouad Shennib (died 2007), poet and Minister of Culture and Education

=== Actors ===
- Amos Lavi
- Baz Ashmawy
- Mario Donatone
- Marisa Abela
- Rossana Podestà

=== Directors and filmmakers ===
- Vittorio De Sisti
- Don Coscarelli
- Robert Haggiag
- Maysoon Shaladi, British actress, model, TV presenter, Big Brother UK contestant
- Fadwa El Gallal

== Leaders and politicians ==
=== Ancient Libya ===
- Shoshenq I, founder of the Twenty-second Dynasty of Egypt.
- Shoshenq II, pharaoh of the Twenty-second Dynasty of Egypt.
- Osorkon the Elder, fifth king of the twenty-first dynasty of Ancient Egypt and was the first Pharaoh of Libyan origin
- Tefnakht, founder of the Twenty-fourth Dynasty of Egypt.
- Siamun the sixth pharaoh of Egypt
- Septimius Severus (146–211), 21st Roman Emperor (193–211), born in Libya
- Geta, shared his brother Caracalla the throne of Rome before he was murdered in 211
- Caracalla 23rd Caesar of Rome, son of Septimius Severus
- Meryey, king of Ancient Libya
- Ankhhor, great chief of the Libu
- Battus II 583–560 BC
- Arcesilaus II 560–550 BC
- Learchus 550 BC (disputed)
- Battus III 550–530 BC
- Arcesilaus III 530–515 BC
- Battus IV 515–465 BC
- Arcesilaus IV 465–440 BC
- Berenice II (Queen) 258–246 BC, alongside a series of her co-rulers: Magas, Demetrius and a republican government
- Demetrius the Fair 250–249 BC
- Ptolemy Apion 116–96 BC
- Cabaon, berber chief of Tripolitania, against the Byzantine Empire
- Ierna, leader of the Laguatan
- Carcasan, berber rebel and leader of the Laguatan
- Khalil ibn Ishaq al-Tamimi, governor of Sicily
- Ya'qub ibn Ishaq al-Tamimi
- Ahmed Karamanli (1686–1745), pasha (ruler) of Tripolitania (1711–1745)
- Yusuf Karamanli (died 1838), pasha of Tripolitania (1795–1832)

=== Modern Libya ===
- Idris I of Libya (1890–1983), King of Libya (1951–1969).
- Umar Mihayshi (died 1984), Libyan army officer
- Muammar Gaddafi (1942–2011), Libyan leader (1969–2011).
- Mustafa Abdul Jalil (born 1952), former Minister of Justice, and President of the National Transitional Council (5 March 2011 – 8 August 2012)
- Zentani Muhammad az-Zentani
- Muammar Gaddafi, (died 2011)
- Wahbi al-Bouri, foreign minister
- Abdul Salam al-Buseiri, foreign minister
- Lamia Abusedra, engineer, revolutionary, political advisor and diplomat
- Mohieddin Fikini, foreign minister
- Abdul Majid Kubar, foreign minister
- Hussein Maziq, foreign minister
- Mahmud al-Muntasir, foreign minister
- Umar Mustafa al-Muntasir, foreign minister
- Muhammad Sakizli, foreign minister
- Abdel Rahman Shalgham, foreign minister
- Jadallah Azzuz at-Talhi, foreign minister
- Dr. Ali Abdulsalam Treki
- Abdulrahman Sewehli

=== Defence ministers ===
- Omar Faiek Shennib, Minister of Defence, 1951–1953 (death)

=== Secretaries general ===
- Kamel Maghur (1935–2002)

=== Prime ministers ===
- Abdul Qadir al-Badri, Prime Minister of Libya (July 2, 1967 – October 25, 1967)
- Abdul Hamid al-Bakkoush
- Abuzed Omar Dorda
- Mohieddin Fikini
- Mustafa Ben Halim
- Abdessalam Jalloud
- Mahmoud Jibril
- Mahmud Sulayman al-Maghribi
- Baghdadi Mahmudi
- Muhammad Ahmad al-Mangoush
- Hussein Maziq
- Mahmud al-Muntasir
- Umar Mustafa al-Muntasir
- Abdul Ati al-Obeidi
- Wanis al-Qaddafi
- Abdul Majid al-Qa′ud
- Muhammad az-Zaruq Rajab
- Muhammad Osman Said
- Muhammad Sakizli
- Imbarek Shamekh
- Jadallah Azzuz at-Talhi

== Schools and academics ==
=== Educators and teachers ===
- Arete of Cyrene
- Carneades, Hellenistic academic skeptic philosopher
- Aristippus, Ancient Greek philosopher, founder of Cyrenaicism
- Lacydes of Cyrene, Academic Skeptic philosopher, was head of the Platonic Academy at Athens
- Zuhra Ramdan Agha Al-Awji
- Mohammed Shegewi (died 2007)

=== Linguists ===
- Kalifa Tillisi (1930–2010), historian, translator, and linguist
- Ibn al-Ajdābī (died after c. 1077), scholar and linguist
- Ibn Manzur

=== Science and mathematics ===
- Ehtuish Ehtuish
- Alaa Murabit
- Eratosthenes (276 BC–194 BC), Hellenistic mathematician, geographer and astronomer, born in Libya
- Theodorus of Cyrene (c. 5th century BC), mathematician
- Ahmed K. Elmagarmid (born 1954), computer scientist
- Sadiq Abdulkarim Abdulrahman
- Laila Bugaighis
- Ghazi Gheblawi
- Amal Bayou
- Sema Sgaier

=== Philosophy ===
- Hegesias of Cyrene
- Antipater of Cyrene
- Anniceris
- Theodorus the Atheist
- Synesius
- Aristippus the Younger
- Aristotle of Cyrene

== Healthcare ==
- Mabrouka al-Tabiba, midwife
- Ahmad Bishti
- Hani Shennib

== Media figures ==
- Halla Diyab, British Libyan-born screenwriter, author, producer, broadcaster and TV commentator
- Hajer Sharief

== Musicians and singers ==
- Ptolemais of Cyrene, music theorist
- Nadia Ali (born 3 August 1980), singer-songwriter
- Ahmed Fakroun, singer, composer and producer
- Hamid Al Shaeri
- Nasser el-Mizdawi (born 1950), singer, guitarist and composer
- Franco Califano
- Herbert Pagani

== Religious figures ==
- Abd As-Salam Al-Asmar
- Abdullah Al-Sha'ab
- Hamza Abu Faris
- Ali Yahya Muammar
- Sharif El Gariani
- Simon of Cyrene
- Pope Victor I
- Lucius of Cyrene
- Arius
- Saint Hadrian
- Jason of Cyrene
- Mark the Evangelist
- Ali ibn Ziyad
- Al-Hattab
- Sadiq Al-Ghariani
- Aref Ali Nayed

== Resistance fighters ==
- Sulaiman al-Barouni (1872–1940), resistance leader against Italian colonization
- Omar al-Mukhtar (1862–1931), Libyan hero and resistance leader under against Italian colonization
- Sayyid Ahmed Sharif as-Senussi, Libyan resistance leader and chief of the Senussi order
- Ramadan Sewehli (1879–1920), Libyan resistance leader and one of the founders of Tripolitanian Republic
- Omar Shegewi (unknown–1928), Libyan resistance fighter who was later sentenced to death
- Muhammad Tariq Abd al-Qadir al-Afriqi (1886–1963), Libyan hero who fought against colonialism in many countries

== Royalty ==
- Idris I of Libya, King of Libya (1951–1969) and the Chief of the Senussi Muslim order
- Queen Fatima (1918–2009), former queen of Libya
- Sayyid Hassan as-Rida
- Sayyid Ahmed Sharif as-Senussi, Chief of the Senussi Muslim order
- Mohammed El Senussi, Crown Prince

== Sportspeople ==
=== Basketball ===
- Suleiman Ali Nashnush (died 1991)

=== Footballers ===
- Samir Aboud
- Luis de Agustini
- Muhammed Alsnany
- Akram Ayyad
- Mansour Al Borki
- Ehab Al Bousefi
- Omar Daoud
- Meftah Ghazalla
- Osama Al Hamady
- Khaled Hussein
- Abdesalam Kames
- Nader Kara
- Abdusalam Khames
- Ahmed Faraj El Masli
- Waled Mhadeb
- Rabe Al Msellati
- Jehad Muntasser
- Arafa Nakuaa
- Walid Ali Osman
- Ali Rahuma
- Marei Al Ramly
- Salem Ibrahim Al Rewani
- Alejandro Ruben
- Hesham Shaban
- Mohmoud Maklouf Shafter
- Younes Al Shibani
- Naji Shushan
- Abdulnaser Slil
- Tarik El Taib
- Reda Al Tawrghe
- Mohamed Zubya
- Ahmed Mahmoud Zuway

=== Others ===
- Yousef El Ghoul, football referee. Only Libyan to ever oversee games at a FIFA World Cup (1982)
- Abdel Hakim Shelmani, football referee
- Mutaz Ibrahim, football referee

== Extrajudicial prisoners of the United States ==
- Omar Khalifa Mohammed Abu Bakr
- Omar Deghayes
- Muhammad Abd Allah Mansur Al Futuri
- Abdel Hamid Ibn Abdussalem Ibn Mifta Al Ghazzawi
- Salem Abdul Salem Ghereby
- Abu Yahia al-Libi
- Abdul Rauf Omar Mohammed Abu Al Qusin
- Ashraf Salim Abd Al Salam Sultan
- Ibrahim Mahdy Achmed Zeidan
