= Aftermath of the Libyan civil war (2011) =

Events following the conclusion of the First Libyan Civil War

Seal of the National Transitional Council

The aftermath of the 2011 Libyan civil war has been characterized by marked change in the social and political order of Libya after the overthrow and killing of Muammar Gaddafi in the civil war that was fought in Libya in 2011. The country has been subject to ongoing proliferation of weapons, Islamist insurgencies, sectarian violence, and lawlessness, with spillovers affecting neighboring countries, including Mali.

After the interim National Transitional Council (NTC) declared that the country had been liberated in October 2011, it began a process to form a new government, prepare for elections and prosecute former Gaddafi regime officials. In the absence of an organized military, armed militias of former rebels continued to assert their role as "guardians of the revolution" around the country, and there were reports of vigilante justice and sporadic clashes between rival militias. International organizations voiced concerns over the proliferation of weapons in the region, and the risk that they might fall into the hands of militant Islamists.

Elections were held in July 2012 to a General National Congress (GNC), which took power a month later, charged with organising a constituent assembly for authoring Libya's new constitution. The NTC was dissolved, and in November 2012 Ali Zeidan was sworn in as prime minister. In March 2014, Zeidan was ousted by the GNC, amid escalating conflict in the country. On 4 August 2014, the GNC was replaced by a newly elected House of Representatives (CoD), but on 25 August 2014, some members of the former GNC reconvened unilaterally and said they had elected Omar al-Hasi as prime minister, effectively leaving the country with two rival governments: the one proclaimed by the CoD in Tobruk and the one proclaimed by the claimant GNC in Tripoli.

== Uprising and civil war ==
The popular uprising against the government of Gaddafi began in January 2011 as non-violent protests, simultaneously with other protests in the Arab Spring. Within weeks, violence broke out in clashes between police and protesters. In February, the National Transitional Council (NTC) was formed in an effort to consolidate efforts for change in the rule of Libya. Gaddafi forces lost control of several cities in eastern Libya, and a number of officials resigned or defected from his government. In March, Gaddafi forces launched a counteroffensive, and regained many of the cities that had been lost to opposition forces. In mid-March, tanks of Gaddafi forces rolled into the main remaining bastion of the opposition forces, Benghazi. At the same time, aircraft of the French Air Force entered Libyan airspace under the mandate of United Nations Security Council Resolution 1973, to prevent any attacks on the city. A multinational coalition launched a large scale air-based military intervention to disable the Gaddafi government's military capabilities and enforce the UN Security Council resolution. By the end of March, command of the coalition operations had been assumed by NATO under Operation Unified Protector.

The following months were characterized by a stalemate on the ground, as opposition fighters were unable to retake cities in western Libya. The stalemate was broken in August as opposition forces advanced on the cities surrounding Tripoli. By the end of August, opposition fighters had captured Tripoli, with little resistance from Gaddafi forces. The opposition then launched a series of campaigns against the last pockets of resistance by Gaddafi loyalists, and in October, Gaddafi and several other leading figures in his government were captured and killed in Gaddafi's hometown of Sirte.

== Events after Gaddafi's death ==
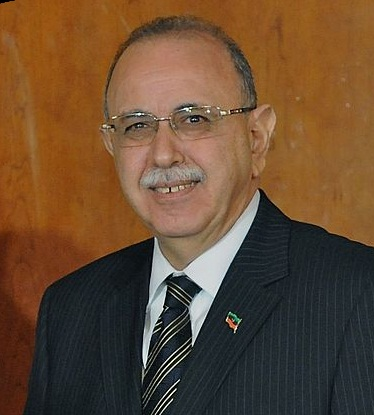
Libyan interim Prime Minister Abdurrahim El-Keib

On 23 October 2011, the National Transitional Council officially declared that Libya had been liberated.

Libya's de facto Prime Minister, Mahmoud Jibril announced that consultations were under way to form an interim government within one month, followed by elections for a constitutional assembly within eight months and parliamentary and presidential elections to be held within a year after that. Jibril then stepped down to make place for elections and was succeeded as interim prime minister by Abdurrahim El-Keib after a brief period in which Jibril's deputy, Ali Tarhouni, had assumed his duties. El-Keib was elected by members of the National Transitional Council, gaining 26 out of 51 votes.

On 31 October 2011, the United Nations mandate authorizing international military action in Libya was lifted, and NATO's Operation Unified Protector formally ended, despite requests by the NTC for military assistance to continue.

=== Formation of a government ===
On 22 November 2011, the NTC named its interim government. Osama al-Juwaili, a commander of the military council in Zintan whose forces were responsible for the capture of Saif al-Islam Gaddafi, was named defense minister. Fawzi Abdelali, a militia leader from Misrata, was named interior minister. Ashour Bin Hayal, a diplomat originally from Derna, was named foreign minister. Hassan Ziglam, an oil industry executive, was named finance minister. Ali Hameda Ashour was named justice minister. Abdulrahman Ben Yezza, a former executive with the Italian oil and gas company Eni, was made oil minister.

On 3 January 2012, Yousef al-Manqoush, a retired general from Misrata, was named head of the Libyan National Army by the NTC.

On 26 April 2012, it was reported that majority of the NTC members approved a no-confidence motion against Prime Minister Abdurrahim el-Keib citing incompetence as the main reason. However, the president of the NTC denied the news stating that the government would stay until the elections in June.

On 14 October 2012, Ali Zeidan was elected Prime Minister by a vote of 93 to 85, with two weeks to submit his proposed new government for approval by Congress. Zeidan's cabinet, formed by ministers from the NFA, the JCP, and independents, was approved by Congress on 31 October 2012 and sworn in on 14 November.

In March 2014, Zeidan was ousted by the GNC. On 4 August 2014, the GNC was replaced by a new House of Representatives. On 25 August 2014, some members of the former GNC reconvened unilaterally in Tripoli and said they had elected Omar al-Hasi as prime minister.

=== First public elections ===
On 1 January 2012, the NTC released a 15-page draft law that would regulate the election of a national assembly charged with writing a new constitution and forming a second caretaker government. The proposed law laid out more than 20 classes of people who would be prohibited from standing as candidates in the elections, including Libyans who had ties to Muammar Gaddafi, former officials accused of torturing Libyans or embezzling public funds, active members of the Revolutionary Guard, opposition members who made peace with Gaddafi and academics who wrote about Gaddafi's The Green Book. The draft bill also stipulated that 10% of the 200 seats in the constituent assembly would be reserved for women. The finalization of the election law would be followed by the appointment of an election commission to divide the country into constituencies and oversee the poll, to be held in June.

The Forum of National Parties, an association of 12 moderate Islamist parties, said it rejected the proposed election law because it encouraged voting along tribal lines and gave undue influence to the wealthy. According to Wasila al-Ashiq, head of one of the parties represented in the organization, candidates would have to run as independents under the proposed law because Libya has no law regulating political parties. That would mean that those candidates capable of drawing on tribal power and affiliation would win the seats, she said, while minorities such as the Berbers would be ignored.

On 28 January 2012, the NTC announced it had adopted a revised version of the electoral bill as law. The proposed 10 percent quota for female members of the constituent assembly was dropped; instead, the law required political parties to have equal numbers of men and women in their candidate lists. Furthermore, the law called for two-thirds of the 200 seats in the constituent assembly – the so-called General National Congress – to go to candidates of political parties, while the remaining seats would be held by independents.

A new law governing the formation of political organisations was passed on by the NTC on 24 April. Political parties based on regional, tribal or religious affiliation were prohibited. Furthermore, parties cannot be an extension of a political party abroad or receive foreign funding.

On 7 July 2012, Libyans voted in their first parliamentary elections since the end of the rule of Muammar Gaddafi. The election, in which more than 100 political parties had registered, formed an interim 200-member national assembly. The purpose of this assembly was to replace the unelected NTC, name a prime minister, and form a committee to draft a constitution. The vote was postponed several times to resolve logistical and technical problems, and to give more time to register to vote, and to vetting candidates.

On 17 July 2012, the High National Election Commission announced provisional results. Jibril's National Forces Alliance (NFA) received 48.1%, taking 39 out of the 80 party-list seats. This was followed by the Justice and Construction Party (JCP), which received 10.3% and 17 seats and third was the National Front Party with 4.1% and three seats. The Union for the Homeland and the National Centrist Party also took two seats, as did the Wadi Al-Hayah Party for Democracy and Development. Fifteen other parties won one party list seat each. On 8 August 2012, the General National Congress replaced NTC.

=== Prosecution of Gaddafi officials ===
Saif al-Islam Gaddafi, his father's heir apparent, was captured near the town of Ubari in the Idehan Ubari by Zintani militiamen on 19 November 2011. His capture was confirmed by the International Criminal Court (ICC), which had issued an arrest warrant for Saif al-Islam Gaddafi and his father during the war. The military council in Zintan said it would hold the Gaddafi son in Zintan until Abdurrahim El-Keib, the incoming Prime Minister of Libya, formed a government it considered capable of taking custody of the high-ranking prisoner.

The chief prosecutor of the ICC, Luis Moreno-Ocampo, said that he was "not competing" with Libyan authorities to prosecute Saif al-Islam Gaddafi and that he was happy for the case to be tried in Libya. The ICC said in a separate statement that it had the "exclusive competence" to decide on the continuation of the case before the court, and that if Libyan authorities wish to conduct the prosecutions against Gaddafi in their own country, they must submit a challenge to the admissibility of the case to the ICC.

On 8 November 2011, a Tunisian court ruled that the former Secretary of the General People's Committee under Gaddafi's government, Baghdadi Mahmudi, should be extradited to Libya. In December, Tunisian interim President Foued Mebazaa said he would not sign a decree to extradite Mahmudi due to fears that he would be subjected to torture if returned to Libya. One of Mahmudi's lawyers reported that Mahmudi's health was "seriously degraded" following a hunger strike in his prison. On 6 January 2012, a statement signed by 15 Tunisian and international human rights groups, including Human Rights Watch, Amnesty International and the Tunisian League for the Defense of Human Rights, called on Tunisian President Moncef Marzouki not to sign the extradition decision ordered by the court.

On 6 September 2011, Mexican authorities uncovered a plot to smuggle Al-Saadi Gaddafi, one of Muammar Gaddafi's sons wanted by the National Transitional Council on suspicion of war crimes, and some members of his family into the country. On 11 November 2011, Niger's President Mahamadou Issoufou said his government had decided to grant Al-Saadi Gaddafi asylum "on humanitarian grounds".

Abdullah al-Senussi, Gaddafi's intelligence chief, was arrested at Nouakchott International Airport in Mauritania upon arrival from Mohammed V International Airport in Casablanca, Morocco, by Mauritanian police on 17 March 2011. France, Libya, and the International Criminal Court have all expressed an interest in trying Senussi.

=== 2014 parliamentary crisis and conflict ===
In one interpretation of the 2011 Libyan interim Constitutional Declaration, the mandate of the General National Congress (GNC) was to expire on 7 February 2014. However, on 23 December 2013, the GNC had unilaterally decided to extend its mandate through 24 December 2014. Public protests erupted as the GNC failed to stand down on 7 February 2014.

On 14 February 2014, General Khalifa Haftar appeared in a video broadcast on state TV, declaring the dissolution of the GNC and the formation of a caretaker government committee to oversee new elections. In response, Libyan Prime Minister Ali Zeidan said: "The GNC is doing its work and so is the government. The army is in its headquarters, and Khalifa Haftar has no authority." He also said legal proceedings under military law would be taken against Haftar for his statement.

On 16 May 2014, Haftar's militia launched a campaign it dubbed "Operation Dignity", in an offensive against Benghazi bases of Ansar al-Sharia.

== Security ==
=== Lawlessness under the interim government ===
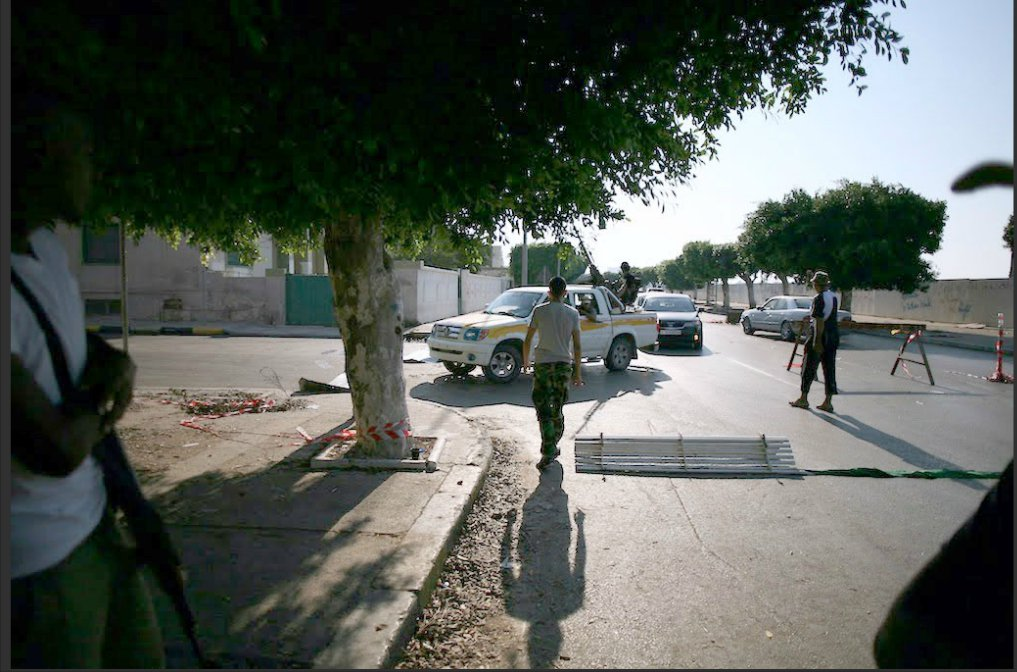
A rebel checkpoint in Tripoli, Libya

During the civil war, brigades of armed volunteers sprang up around the country, reporting to local military councils, which became de facto local governments. Civilian leaders said that, after the declaration of liberation, the militias shifted from merely delaying the surrender of their weapons to actively asserting a continuing political role as "guardians of the revolution". Some of the largest, and most well-equipped brigades were associated with Islamist groups then forming political parties.

Reports suggested sporadic clashes between rival militias, and vigilante revenge killings. Civilian residents reported being subjected to looting and robbery by gunmen. In December 2011, a group of armed men dragged Libya's attorney general Abdul-Aziz al-Hassady from his car in broad daylight in Tripoli, threatening to kill him if he didn't release one of their friends who had been arrested on suspicion of murder. Days later, a group of Zintani gunmen attacked the convoy of a top army officer, Gen. Khalifa Haftar, as it was speeding through a checkpoint set up by the group. In a separate incident, gunfire broke out between the army and the Zintan brigade at the Tripoli International Airport. On 16 December 2011, Haftar said an armed group had abducted his son, Belgassim, and detained him at the airport.

While initially unwilling to let foreign private security firms operate in Libya, by December the NTC had allowed Western mercenaries to move in to fill the security vacuum around the country. The main focus of the security contractors were oil industry sites. Interim interior minister Fawzi Abdelali stated that the authorities were planning to integrate 50,000 former rebels into the security forces of the defence and interior ministries; over the long term, 200,000 fighters would be rehabilitated. $8 billion were allocated to get the program started.

On 6 December 2011, Libya's interim government announced that, following consultations with Tripoli's local council, it had given militias lingering in the capital until late December to hand over security to the authorities. Officials said residents of Tripoli would convene rallies in support of the initiative to clear the city of weapons and out-of-town fighters. If militias had not withdrawn by 20 December 2011, the authorities and members of the public intended to close the whole city to traffic. By January 2012, the former rebels had dismantled most of their checkpoints, while some key bases still remained.

In March 2012, the Secretary-General on the United Nations Support Mission in Libya reported that:

Intermittent clashes between the brigades and other incidents continued to pose a challenge to the authorities in their efforts to contain the overall security situation and to manage the risks associated with the continued proliferation of weapons on the streets and the large number of armed brigades whose lines of command and control remained unclear.

On 11 September 2012, 4 Americans, including visiting United States Ambassador to Libya J. Christopher Stevens, were killed when the U.S. diplomatic mission in Benghazi came under attack. U.S. officials said heavily armed extremists had laid siege to the consulate using "military-style tactics". On 21 September, thousands of demonstrators, along with government police officers, stormed the bases of several Islamist militias in Benghazi, including Ansar al-Sharia, which has been linked to the attack on the U.S. consulate, and forced their members to flee.

On 9 January 2013, the Libyan Ministry of the Interior reported that the number of murders has risen from 87 in 2010 to 525 in 2012 – a 503% increase – while thefts over the same period have risen from 143 to 783 – a 448% increase. In September 2013, armed groups were blockading oilfields.

On 10 October 2013, the Prime Minister of Libya, Ali Zeidan, was briefly captured by an armed group. He was released hours later.

On 23 August 2014, after 10 days of clashes, Tripoli International Airport fell from government control to fighters from Libyan Central Shield, a coalition of Islamist and Misrata forces. On 25 August 2014, four senior U.S. officials said that Egypt and the United Arab Emirates had "secretly launched airstrikes against Islamist-allied militias battling for control of Tripoli" twice in the preceding seven days without informing their military partner, the U.S.

=== Extralegal imprisonments ===
Hundreds of suspected Gaddafi supporters have been rounded up by revolutionary brigades, often on the basis of only rumour and accusation. According to a report by the Secretary-General of the United Nations, up to 7,000 people, including women and children, are being held in private jails outside the control of the NTC, "with no access to due process in the absence of a functioning police and judiciary". Many of the prisoners are being subjected to torture and systematic abuse, and there are reports of "women held in detention in the absence of female guards and under male supervision, and of children detained alongside adults." A large number of the detainees are sub-Saharan Africans, in some cases accused or suspected of being pro-Gaddafi mercenaries, and some individuals were "being targeted because of the colour of their skin".

On 26 January 2012, Doctors Without Borders (MSF) announced that it had suspended its operations in detention centres in Misrata due to detainees there being tortured and denied urgent medical care.

Libyan officials acknowledged that prisoners held by revolutionary forces had been abused, but insisted that the mistreatment had been committed by militias not yet under the control of the new government and that the authorities were trying to eliminate it. A law passed by the NTC ordered militias to refer all cases against Gaddafi supporters to government prosecutors by 1 July 2012.

According to the UN, about 8,000 people were still being held in Libya's detention centres as of October 2013.

=== Proliferation of weapons ===
On 31 October 2011, the United Nations Security Council expressed concern over the proliferation of weapons from Gaddafi's stockpiles, worrying they could fall into the hands of al-Qaeda and other militant groups. Officials of the NTC said it was not clear how many weapons were still in circulation.

A report by the United Nations Support Mission in Libya said that Gaddafi's government had accumulated a large stockpile of MANPADs, and that although thousands were destroyed during the 2011 military intervention in Libya, there were "increasing concerns over the looting and likely proliferation of these portable defence systems, as well as munitions and mines, highlighting the potential risk to local and regional stability."

In November, a convoy loaded with heavy weaponry was intercepted when trying to cross from Libya into neighboring Niger, according to Nigerien security officials. The officials said the convoy was composed of loyalists of Muammar Gaddafi. Mokhtar Belmokhtar, believed to be one of the leaders of Al-Qaeda in the Islamic Maghreb, acknowledged that his Al-Qaeda franchise had acquired weaponry from Gaddafi's arsenal.

=== Influence of Islamists and foreign powers ===
In August, Abdelhakim Belhadj was appointed commander of the Tripoli Military Council, a grouping of several brigades of rebels involved in taking the capital. Belhadj was the emir of the Libyan Islamic Fighting Group. In 2004, he was taken into custody by the CIA and rendered to the Libyan government at the time, who held him in the Abu Salim prison for seven years, where he claims to have been subjected to torture. Rival commanders in the uprising complained that Belhadj has close ties to the Qatari monarchy.

Ali al-Sallabi, an Islamist cleric, who lived in Doha for four years, was a key conduit for weapons, vehicles and funds from Qatar to the Libyan rebels during the civil war. Rebel commanders outside of Sallabi's circle openly complained that they lacked weapons and medical supplies, leading NTC's head of government, Mahmoud Jibril, to send an envoy to Doha to lobby for weapons and supplies to be sent through him. But of the 18 plane loads from Qatar, only five were sent through this NTC-approved channel. This led NTC and Western officials to raise concerns that the Qatari seemed to be aiding primarily Islamist leaders at the expense of the NTC. Sallabi, who is well known as an Islamic scholar and orator in Libya, announced the formation of a party based on Islamic principles. The Freedom and Justice Party was also founded on such principles.

Following the end of Gaddafi's rule, there were reports of attacks against sites of Sufi Muslims. In late 2011, a Sufi school in Tripoli was stormed by armed men who "burned its library, destroyed office equipment and dug up graves of sages buried there," and "turned the school into a Salafi mosque." In August 2012, several Sufi sites were heavily damaged or destroyed, including the tomb of Abd As-Salam Al-Asmar in Zliten and the mausoleum of Abdullah Al-Sha'ab in Tripoli. Three United Nations Independent Experts condemned the destruction of Sufi religious and historic sites in various parts of the country, and Human Rights Watch said the Libyan government had "failed both to protect sites sacred to Libyan Muslims who follow Sufi practices and to arrest those who have destroyed the tombs." On 26 August, Libyan interior minister Fawzi Abdel A'al resigned in protest at criticism from the General National Congress over his handling of the violence in the country, though the resignation was subsequently withdrawn.

In July 2014, Ansar al-Sharia said it had seized complete control of Benghazi and that the city had now become "an Islamic emirate". By October 2014, the group had also declared an "Islamic emirate" in the eastern city of Derna and pledged allegiance to Islamic State of Iraq and Syria (ISIS).

=== Neighbouring states ===
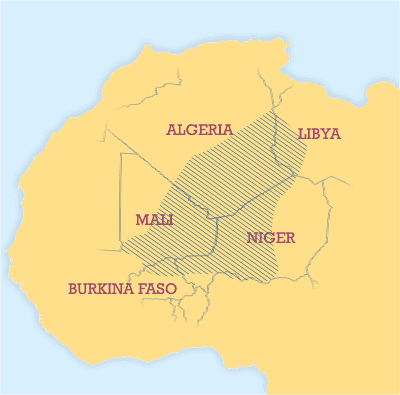
A map of the Tuareg region.

In the months following the Libyan uprising, the Sahel region saw thousands of combatants originating from Mali and Niger, mostly ethnic Tuareg who supported either Gaddafi or the NTC, returning from Libya to their respective countries with a wide range of weapons. Mali's defence minister, Natie Plea, said that the risk of organizations such as Al-Qaeda in the Islamic Maghreb (AQIM) seizing the arsenal for terrorist purposes was "a real source of concern" for countries in the desert sub-region. The head of the United Nations Office for West Africa stated that the UN also was concerned about the impact of the Libyan crisis on countries in the Sahel. Algeria's secret service warned that AQIM had planned a "wave of abductions" of Westerners in the wake of the instability in North Africa following the Arab Spring. On 23 November 2011, two French nationals were kidnapped in northern Mali. On 25 November 2011, a Dutchman, a South African and a Swede were abducted and a German citizen killed in a raid in Timbuktu. AQIM claimed responsibility for both of the incidents. British Foreign Secretary William Hague acknowledged that the revolution in Libya had affected the security situation of the Sahel. EU foreign policy chief Catherine Ashton said the EU had earmarked 150 million euros ($200 million) to support security efforts "covering, as a priority, Mauritania, Mali and Niger."

On 28 November 2011, Tunisian customs officers stopped three cars at the Ras Ajdir border crossing, two of which carried contraband. Relatives of the smuggler retaliated by burning tires in front of the Ben Gardane town hall, spreading concern in the city and requiring national and regional officials to intervene. On 30 November 2011, a group of Libyans on the Tunisian side of the border crossing assisted several vehicles loaded with contraband cross into Libya. A Tunisian policeman failed an attempt to stop the vehicles and was attacked and threatened with a firearm, an eyewitness reported. Border police went on strike in protest of the lack of security and the Tunisian Armed Forces decided to close the border crossing indefinitely. The Tunisian foreign ministry voiced "deep concern" over the infringements of the country's territorial integrity and urged Libya to increase security at the border post. Abdelhakim Belhadj of the Tripoli Military Council expressed deep regret over the disorder at the Ras Ajdir border crossing and strongly condemned "any attack that violates the sanctity of Tunisian soil."

In mid-January 2012, the Malian military clashed with the National Movement for the Liberation of Azawad in Aguelhok, Ménaka, and Tessalit in northern Mali, losing at least one soldier to several Tuareg militants in the process of repulsing the rebels' attack. A statement by the Malian government said the assailants "included forces that returned from Libya". In March, the Malian government of Amadou Toumani Touré was ousted in a coup by Malian soldiers over its handling of the insurgency in the country. In June 2013, a peace agreement was signed between the government and Tuareg militants, after intervention in the conflict by the French Armed Forces.

== Politics ==
=== Public protests ===
By December 2011, the NTC were facing protests in Benghazi over the pace of reforms and lack of transparency in the new Libyan government. Protesters were criticizing the NTC and its chairman Mustafa Abdul Jalil and demanding that former Gaddafi supporters would be excluded from governing posts in the new Libyan state. Jalil called for patience and promised that personal details and official information of all government officials would be published publicly on the Internet in time.

On 19 January 2012, the vice president of the NTC, Abdul Hafiz Ghoga, was surrounded and jostled by a mob of protesters at the University of Benghazi where he was attending a memorial ceremony for those killed during the civil war. He escaped unharmed. Witnesses said the crowd accused him of opportunism due to his belated defection from Gaddafi's government. The NTC responded to the incident by saying "every attack or aggression against the National Transitional Council represents an attack on the sovereignty of the Libyan people and its glorious revolution." On 22 January 2012, Ghoga resigned from the NTC, saying he did not want the "atmosphere of hatred" to affect the council and its performance.

On 21 January 2012, hundreds of protesters, including many young men wounded from the civil war, stormed the NTC's headquarters in Benghazi, protesting the speed of reforms and lack of transparency from the interim government. When the head of the NTC, Mustafa Abdul Jalil, appeared to address the crowd, the protesters began throwing empty plastic bottles at him, prompting security forces to fire tear gas. Before storming the headquarters, protesters threw stones and metal bars at the building, breaking its windows. Jalil is believed to have been pulled to safety after he went back into the building.

On 1 July 2012, protesters calling for an autonomous eastern region stormed the headquarters of the national election commission in Benghazi.

=== Ethnic and tribal reconciliation ===
During the civil war, many Tuareg nomad tribes in southern Libya supported Gaddafi because of his past support of their people's rebellions in Mali and Niger. This led to tensions between Tuareg and Arab Libyans, and in the aftermath of the war, the NTC sent out delegations to mediate disputes and reconcile the region with the interim government. The tribes, who roam Libya's vast desert expanses, are important to security in the region's remote areas, which are often exploited as a safe haven by drug traffickers and Islamist militants.

Fathi Ben Khalifa, president of the World Amazigh Congress, criticized the NTC for not formally recognizing the Berber people, saying that his people is experiencing a "déjà vu feeling", as Libya's rulers also failed to recognize the Berbers when the country gained its independence in 1951, making way for Gaddafi's policies of assimilation. Khalifa claims that the NTC is adhering to "Arab and Islamist" ideologies that caused "much of what has happened in [Libya] for the last decades", and that the council envisions the new Libya being rooted in an exclusively Islamic constitution. According to Khalifa, "no [Berber] will accept this situation".

Smaller tribal groups complained they had been neglected in the interim government announced by the NTC on 22 November 2011. Members of the Benghazi-based Awagi and Maghariba tribes protested that their representatives were not selected for key posts. A group calling itself the Libyan Amazigh Congress called for a suspension of relations with the NTC until it "reconciles with the demands of Amazigh Libyans."

On 23 June 2013, the General National Congress elected Nouri Abusahmain, a political independent from the Berber minority, as its new president.

=== Islamic movement ===
Ali al-Sallabi, a well-known Muslim cleric who played a key role in funneling arms from Qatar to the anti-Gaddafi fighters during the civil war, has announced the formation of a party with the provisional name National Gathering for Freedom, Justice and Development. According to Sallabi, the party is not Islamist, but respects the general principles of Islam and Libyan culture. Sallabi would not oppose Hamas' armed struggle against Israel and supports the lifting of laws banning polygamy. The party has the backing of the head of the Tripoli Military Council, Abdelhakim Belhadj, as well as "tribal leaders and members of the National Transitional Council".

On 17 November 2011, the Muslim Brotherhood held its first public conference on Libyan soil in Benghazi after having been banned for decades under Gaddafi's government. Suleiman Abdelkader, leader of the Libyan Muslim Brotherhood, said that rebuilding the country "is not a task for one group or one party but for everyone, based on their ability." He also said his organization would not take part in the interim government.

On 9 January 2012, a group of Libyan Muslim scholars announced the formation of a new Islamist party by the name Party of Reform and Development. A statement from the group said the party was an "Islamist party committed to the principles of Islamic sharia", aiming to work for establishing a state based on institutions. The chairman of the party, Khaled al-Wershefani, said the group aimed "to focus on national unity and build a Libyan state which is modern, civilized and developed and which does not exclude or marginalize anyone." He added that the party would refuse to deal with any group which "contradicts sharia," referring to the secular and liberal factions in Libya.

=== Legislation ===
The National Transitional Council adopted laws in early May 2012 granting immunity to former rebel fighters for acts committed during the civil war, confiscating all former regime assets, criminalising "praising or glorifying" Muammar Gaddafi or his regime, and barring criticism of the revolution or the authority of the Libyan government. It also decreed that detained fighters must be charged and tried by 12 July 2012 or else released. It was not immediately clear whether the laws would govern the transitional period only or would else be permanent. Law 37, which prohibits criticism of the revolution and publication of "propaganda", including vocal support for Gaddafi's family or the ideas of the Green Book, is reportedly based on provisions of the Gaddafi-era penal code banning criticism of the 1969 coup that brought Gaddafi to power. The law has faced criticism from Human Rights Watch (HRW) and other NGOs, and a group of Libyan human rights lawyers has vowed to oppose it before the Supreme Court, HRW said. On 15 June 2012, the Supreme Court nullified the law.

=== Foreign relations ===
On 19 October 2011, the NTC became the first government in the world to recognize the Syrian National Council (SNC) as Syria's "legitimate authority." In November, the Libyan authorities met secretly with members of the SNC and offered them money, arms and, potentially, volunteer fighters for the insurgency against the Syrian government. Abdelhakim Belhadj, head of the Tripoli Military Council, met with leaders of the Free Syrian Army to discuss sending Libyan fighters to train the army's troops. By December, thousands of refugees fleeing the escalating violence in Syria were seeking shelter in Libya.

On 25 November, NTC chairman Mustafa Abdul Jalil met with the President of Sudan, Omar al-Bashir, thanking the country for its support of the rebels during the civil war. The Sudanese government supplied the Libyan rebels with arms and ammunition during the uprising. Jalil vowed to establish ties with Sudan in all fields and promised "high-level security cooperation" with the country.

On 16 January 2012, Egypt's military ruler Hussein Tantawi arrived on an official visit to Tripoli.

== Economy ==
=== Oil ===
On 29 December 2011, Libya's National Oil Corporation (NOC) announced that the country's output of crude oil had risen to over 1 million barrels per day (bpd), compared to 1.6 million bpd before the uprising. Libya's biggest oil terminal, Es Sider, resumed operations as of January 2012 but may take more than a year to be fully repaired.

NOC has said that local crude and product needs are given priority. Of Libya's total crude distillation capacity of 378,000 bpd, the country's five domestic refineries are refining 160,000 bpd of current production. Libya's largest refinery, Ra's Lanuf Refinery, is expected to remain offline until the end of the year.

The International Energy Agency said the bulk of repairs to oil infrastructure had been undertaken by local petroleum industry staff, but many of the repairs would have to be performed by foreign specialists working for the international oil companies. Most oil companies have deployed small teams to restart production. NOC said it had taken over full control of marketing Libyan oil, which split during the civil war, and that all future deals would give preference to actors who had shown early support during the uprising.

The Libyan interior ministry reported on 3 May 2012 that the oil fields were operating in a normal fashion and the production was good. He added that the production of oil had reached 1.55 million barrels per day the previous week, almost pre-war levels. However, by September 2013, armed groups were blockading oilfields, cutting production to about 100,000 barrels per day, leading to some fuel shortages and blackouts. Many in the armed groups were current and former employees of units set up to secure the oilfields, reacting to corruption and low pay.

In September 2014 there were armed clashes near the El Sharara oil field and the Zawiya refinery. After armed opposition groups took control of Tripoli, a rival oil minister, Mashallah al-Zawie, gave a speech at the oil ministry.

=== Public funds ===
At the beginning of the civil war, the UN Security Council froze an estimated $150 billion in foreign Libyan assets. By late November 2011, $18 billion had been released to the NTC by the council's sanctions committee. $3 billion had been made available to the new Libyan government.

Meanwhile, demands for wages, medication and reconstruction were putting a strain on Libya's limited supply of cash, causing prices to rise. On 10 December 2011, senior figures in Libya's new leadership wrote a letter to the United Nations, urging it to release the frozen assets which they said were "essential for the economic stability of Libya". Western officials said legal complications prevented the money from being released quickly. A British Foreign Office minister said his administration would release Libyan assets frozen in the United Kingdom once Libyan authorities demonstrated their ability to manage them effectively.

On 16 December 2011, the UN Security Council lifted sanctions on Libya's central bank and its offshore subsidiary, Libyan Foreign Bank. Later the same day, the U.S. Treasury Department said it had unblocked more than $30 billion in Libyan government assets.

== See also ==
- 2012 Bani Walid uprising
- 2012 Benghazi attack (among the reactions to Innocence of Muslims)
- Gaddafi loyalism after the Libyan Civil War
- Slavery in the post-Gaddafi era
