= Halla (name) =

Halla is a feminine given name and a surname. Notable people with the name include:

== Given name ==
=== First name ===
- Halla Margrét Árnadóttir (born 1964), Icelandic singer
- Halla Bouksani (born 2000), Algerian badminton player
- Halla Diyab, Libyan-born British screenwriter
- Halla Gunnarsdóttir (born 1981), Icelandic politician and journalist
- Halla Pai Huhm (1922–1994), Korean American dancer
- Halla Mohieddeen (born 1979), Lebanese British journalist and television presenter
- Halla Tómasdóttir (born 1968), president of Iceland since 2024
- Halla Vilhjálmsdóttir (born 1982), Icelandic actress and singer

=== Middle name ===
- Arndís Halla Ásgeirsdóttir (born 1969), Icelandic opera singer
- Freydís Halla Einarsdóttir (born 1994), Icelandic ski racer

== Surname ==
- John Halla (1884–1947), American baseball player
- Joseph Halla (1814–1887), Czech Austrian physician
- Martin Halla (born 1988), Norwegian singer
- Paul Halla (1931–2005), Austrian football player

== See also ==
- Halla, the main character of the 2018 fantasy novel Swordheart
