= Sarah Besan Shennib =

Libyan noble

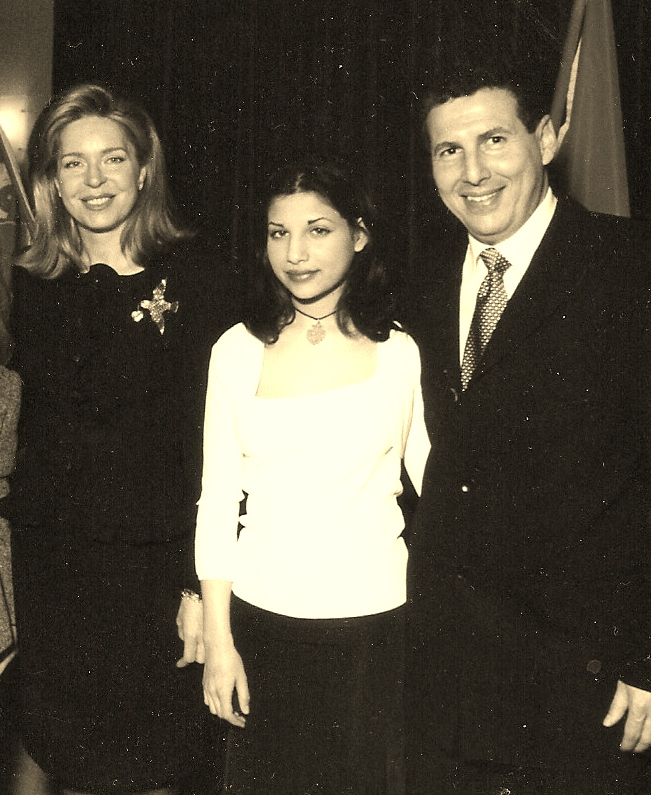

Sayyida Sarah Shennib (Arabic: ساره شنيب Sarah Besaan Shennib) is a direct descendant of the Libyan noble family, the House of Shennib.

== Ancestry ==
Sarah Besan is a direct descendant of the House of Shennib, great-granddaughter of Sir Omar Faiek Shennib, founder of the current House of Shennib Head of Royal Libyan Court (the Royal Diwan), Minister of Defence and Vice President of National Assembly of Libya. Omar Faiek's few remaining direct descendants are delineated through the marriage of his nephew, Sir Ahmed Fouad Shennib, and Omar Faiek's daughter, Lady Ibtisam Shennib. The marriage produced five children: Dr. Huda Shennib, Dr. Hani Shennib, Ola Shennib, Adnan Shennib and Faten Shennib. Following Muammar Gaddafi's coup of 1969, the descendants of the House of Shennib lived primarily in exile, which saw the House geographically splintered in the decades following thereon.

== Biography ==
Eldest daughter of Dr. Hani Shennib, son of Ahmed Fouad Shennib, Libyan Minister of Education and Culture and Cultural Attache to UNESCO until 1959 and daughter of Dr. Awatef Shihabeldeen, a Kuwaiti national, Sarah Besan was born in San Francisco, California in 1978, during Hani Shennib's exile from Libya at the height of the Gaddafi regime's persecution of those closely affiliated with the deposed Kingdom of Libya.

Following a brief return to London in 1979, increased activity of Gaddafi's agents in London resulted in the Shennib family relocating once again, this time to Canada. The family settled in the French-speaking province of Quebec where both Sir Hani Shennib and his wife took up medical positions at McGill University, in Montreal.

Sarah is co-author of the film Valley of Flowers (film) released in 2006 and won Best Jury Award at IFFLA at IFFLA L.A. in 2007.

== See also ==
- House of Shennib
- List of Libyans
- Valley of Flowers (film)
