= List of Libyan detainees at Guantanamo Bay =

The United States Department of Defense acknowledges holding Libyan detainees in Guantanamo. A total of 780 detainees have been held in extrajudicial detention in the Guantanamo Bay detention camps, in Cuba since the camps opened on January 11, 2002. The camp population peaked in 2004 at approximately 660. Hundreds of detainees were released without charges.

Following the United States Supreme Court's ruling in Rasul v. Bush (2004) that detainees had the right under habeas corpus to challenge their detention before an impartial tribunal, transfers to Guantanamo decreased.

Nineteen "high value detainees" have been transferred by the CIA to Guantanamo since September 2006, as the administration restricted their access to outside counsel and courts under the Military Commissions Act of 2006. This provision of the act was declared unconstitutional by the Supreme Court in Boumediene v. Bush (2008), which said detainees had the right of access to federal courts for habeas corpus challenges. As of February 24, 2010, the camp population stood at 188.

On February 24, 2010, Albania accepted the transfer of three former detainees, a Libyan, an Egyptian, and a Tunisian.

ISN	Name	Arrival date	Departure date	Notes
189	Salem Abdul Salem Ghereby	2002-05-05	2016-04-04	Transferred to Senegal on 2016-04-04
194	Mohammed Abd Allah Mansur Al Futuri; Muhammad Abd Allah Mansur Al Futuri; Muhammad Abd Allah Manur Safrani Al Futri; Muhammad Abdallah Mansur Al Rimi; Mohammed Rimi	2002-01-16	2006-12-15	Named differently on the official lists of names.; Captured wearing a Casio F91W digital watch.; Allegedly an employee of the Pakistani Islamic missionary group, Tablighi Jamaat.; Released on December 18, 2006.
263	Ashraf Salim Abd Al Salam Sultan	2002-02-09		
557	Abu Sufian bin Qumu	2002-05-05	2007-09-28	Repatriated in the fall of 2007. In 2011, he emerged as a rebel leader in the Libyan civil war against Muammar Gaddafi. Reported to be involved in the terror attack on the US consulate that resulted in the death of US Ambassador Chris Stevens.
654	Abdel Hamid al-Ghazzawi	2002-06-18	2010-03-23	His case was considered by two Combatant Status Review Tribunals. The first Tribunal in November 2004 determined he had not been an "enemy combatant" and there was no evidence of al-Qaeda involvement. A second Tribunal was convened 55 days later with new members, in Washington, at which neither the detainee nor his representative was present. Claiming new "secret" information, the tribunal in January 2005 found him to be an enemy combatant. His attorney reviewed the files in 2006 and found there was no new information, secret or otherwise, and described the ruling as a "kangaroo court." No charges were ever filed against him.; Transferred to Georgia on March 23, 2010.
685	Abdelrazak Ali Abdelrahman	2002-06-18		
695	Omar Khalifa Mohammed Abu Bakr	2002-08-05	2016-04-04	Released in Senegal.
708	Ismael Ali Faraj Ali Bakush	2002-08-05		
709	Abdul Rauf Omar Mohammed Abu Al Qusin	2002-08-05	2010-02-24	Transferred to Albania.
727	Omar Deghayes	2002-08-05	2007-12-19	His lawyer, Clive Stafford Smith, the legal director of Reprieve alleges that Deghayes was blinded by pepper spray used by guards inside the Guantanamo prison.; Transferred to the United Kingdom.
761	Ibrahim Mahdy Achmed Zeidan	2002-08-05	2007-11-02	Transferred to Jordan on November 2, 2007.
