= Otto Kahler =

Austrian physician and pathologist (1849–1893)

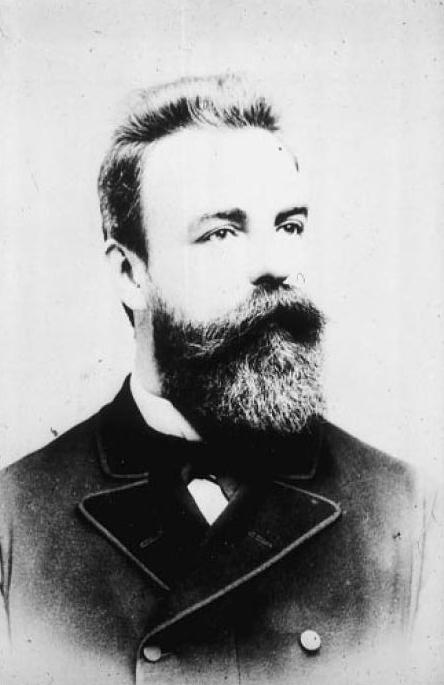
- Otto Kahler (1849-1893)
- Born: 8 January 1849; Prague, Austrian Empire
- Died: 24 January 1893 (aged 44); Vienna, Austria-Hungary
- Known for: Kahler's disease
- Medical career
- Profession: Physician, Pathologist, Professor
- Institutions: Karl-Ferdinands-Universität, University of Vienna

Otto Kahler (January 8, 1849 – January 24, 1893) was a physician and pathologist born in Prague, Austrian Empire.

In 1871 he obtained his medical doctorate in Prague, and following an educational trip to Paris, returned to his hometown as an assistant to Joseph Halla (1814–1887) at the internal clinic. In 1882 he became an associate professor at Karl-Ferdinands-Universität, and a few years later (1886), was a "full professor" of pathology and therapy. In 1889 he relocated to the University of Vienna, succeeding Heinrich von Bamberger (1822–1888) as professor of special pathology. After a year in Vienna, he developed tongue cancer and his assistant, Friedrich Kraus (1858–1936), subsequently took over his lectures. Kahler died in Vienna in 1893.

He is best known for describing multiple myeloma, a hematological malignancy, which is called "Kahler's disease" in his honor in several countries. Additionally, he made various important discoveries in the field of neurology, such as describing syringomyelia, and the arrangement of the posterior columns in the spinal cord (the Kahler–Pick law, with Arnold Pick).

== Written works ==
- Beiträge zur Pathologie und pathologischen Anatomie des Centralnervensystems. (with Arnold Pick), 1879 (Contributions to the pathology and pathological anatomy of the central nervous system).
- Ueber die Diagnose der Syringomyelie. Prager medicinische Wochenshrift, Prague, 1889, 13: 45, 63. (On diagnosis of syringomyelia)
- Zur Symptomatologie des multiplen Myeloms. Beobachtung von Albumosurie. Prager medicinische Wochenshrift, Prague, 1889, 14: 33–35, 44–49. (Symptomatology of multiple myeloma).
