= Arndís =

Arndís is a feminine Icelandic given name. Notable people with the name include:

- Arndís Halla (born 1969), Icelandic soprano opera singer
- Arndís Þórarinsdóttir (born 1982), Icelandic children's author
