= Tabular Islamic calendar =

Rule-based variation of the Islamic calendar

Today (at UTC+00)
- Thursday, 12 November 2026
- Islamic: 1 Jumada al-thani, AH 1448 (using tabular method)
Other calendars
Akan	Monoyaw
Armenian	25 Trē 1476
Aztec	Tlacaxipehualiztli 1, 8 Ocēlōtl
Babylonian	1 Arakhsamna, 2337 SE
Balinese pawukon	Luang, Pepet, Kajeng, Menala, Pon, Maulu, Wraspati of Landep, Yama, Dadi, Manuh
Bengali	27 Kartik, BS 1433
Chinese	Yang Metal Tiger・Horn Mansion; Fire Horse Year, Month 10, Day 4 (Lidong, 10 days until Xiaoxue)
Common Era	12 November 2026 CE
Coptic	3 Hathor, AM 1743
Egyptian	30 Phamenoth, 2775 NE
Ethiopian	3 H̱edār, 2019 Amätä Məhrät
French Republican	Décade III, Primidi de Brumaire de l'Année 235 de la République
Gregorian	12 November, AD 2026
Hebrew	2 Kislev, AM 5787
Hindu	Jyeṣṭhā・Atigaṇḍa; Solar: 26 Kārtika, 1948 SE; Lunisolar: Tr̥tīyā, Śukla pakṣa of Kārtika, 2083 VE; Rāudra・5127 KY・1,872,891
Icelandic	Fimmtudagur, 20 Gormánuður 2026
ISO week date	2026-W46-4
Japanese	4 Kannazuki, Reiwa 8 (Rittō, 10 days until Shōsetsu)
Julian	30 October, AD 2026 (AM 7535)
Julian day	2461357
Korean	4 Dwaejidal, 4359 DE
Maya	13.0.14.1.14; 7 Ceh, 8 Ix
Roman	ante diem III Kalendas Novembres, MMDCCLXXIX AUC
Solar Hijri	21 Aban, SH 1405
Tibetan	3 smin drug, me pho rta 2153 or 1772 or 1000

The Tabular Islamic calendar (Arabic: التقويم الهجري المجدول, romanized: altaqwim alhijriu almujadwal) is a rule-based variation of the lunar Hijri calendar. It has the same numbering of years and months, but the starting moment of each months is determined by arithmetical rules rather than by lunar crescent observation or astronomical calculations. It was developed by early Muslim astronomers to provide a predictable time base to calculate the positions of the Moon, Sun, and planets. It is now used by historians to convert an AH date into a Western calendar date when no other information (like the day of the week) is available. Its era is the Hijri era.

Each year has 12 months for a total of 354 or 355 days, approximating a lunar year. The odd numbered months have 30 days and the even numbered months have 29 days, except in a leap year when the 12th and final month Dhu al-Hijjah has 30 days.

Virtually all Muslims in the Sunni Islam tradition use the lunar Hijri calendar for religious purposes. (Note: Most Muslims in the Shia Islam tradition use the solar Hijri calendar based on astronomical observation of the spring Equinox in the northern hemisphere.) This depends in principle on actual observation of the first crescent of the new moon (hilal), to declare the beginning of each month. (The Umm al-Qura calendar, which uses astronomical calculations to identify the day of first crescent independently of weather conditions, is widely used in practice.) Apart from a sect in India and Pakistan (who use this tabular calendar directly), (Note: The Dawoodi Bohra, a religious denomination within the Ismā'īlī branch of Shia Islam) the tabular calendar is employed only to approximate the date (because dates predicted by the tabular Islamic calendar can occur one or two days too early or too late compared to the observational calendar).

== Intercalary schemes ==
=== 30-year cycle ===
In its most common form there are 11 leap years in a 30-year cycle. Noting that the average year has 354 11/30 days and a common year has 354 days, at the end of the first year of the 30-year cycle the remainder is 11/30 day. Whenever the remainder exceeds a half day (15/30 day), then a leap day is added to that year, reducing the remainder by one day. Thus at the end of the second year the remainder would be 22/30 day which is reduced to −8/30 day by a leap day. Using this rule the leap years are year number 2, 5, 7, 10, 13, 16, 18, 21, 24, 26 and 29 of the 30-year cycle.

If leap days are added whenever the remainder equals or exceeds a half day, then all leap years are the same except 15 replaces 16 as the sixth long year per cycle.

The Ismaili Tayyebi community delays three leap days by one year: the third to year 8, the seventh to year 19 and the tenth to year 27 in their 30-year cycle. There is another version where, in addition, the fourth leap day is postponed to year 11 and the last leap day is in the last year of the 30-year cycle.

The mean number of days per month in the 30-year cycle is 29.53056 days, or 29d 12h 44m. Six months of 29 days and six with 30 days, plus 11 days of the leap years. (29 days × 6 months + 30 days × 6 months) × 30 years + 11 leap days = 10,631 days and 10,631 / 360 = 29.53056 (360 is number of months in 30 years). And this is approximately how long it takes for the Moon to make full lunar cycle.

Microsoft's Kuwaiti algorithm is used in Windows to convert between Gregorian calendar dates and Islamic calendar dates. There is no fixed correspondence defined in advance between the algorithmic Gregorian solar calendar and the Islamic lunar calendar determined by actual observation. As an attempt to make conversions between the calendars somewhat predictable, Microsoft claims to have created this algorithm based on statistical analysis of historical data from Kuwait. According to Rob van Gent, the so-called "Kuwaiti algorithm" is simply an implementation of the standard Tabular Islamic calendar algorithm used in Islamic astronomical tables since the 11th century.

Overview of various 30-year leap cycles
Origin or usage	Long lunar years (nth/30)											Gap till next long year										
Origin or usage	#1	#2	#3	#4	#5	#6	#7	#8	#9	#10	#11	#1	#2	#3	#4	#5	#6	#7	#8	#9	#10	#11
Kūshyār ibn Labbān, Ulugh Beg, Taqī ad-Dīn Muḥammad ibn Maʾruf	2	5	7	10	13	15	18	21	24	26	29	3	2	3	3	2	3	3	3	2	3	3
al-Fazārī, al-Khwārizmī, al-Battānī, Toledan Tables, Alfonsine Tables, Microsoft "Kuwaiti algorithm"	2	5	7	10	13	16	18	21	24	26	29	3	2	3	3	3	2	3	3	2	3	3
Muḥammad ibn Fattūḥ al-Jamāʾirī of Seville	2	5	8	10	13	16	18	21	24	26	29	3	3	2	3	3	2	3	3	2	3	3
Fāṭimid / Ismāʿīlī / Ṭayyibī / Bohorā calendar, Ibn al-Ajdābī	2	5	8	10	13	16	19	21	24	27	29	3	3	2	3	3	3	2	3	3	2	3
Ḥabash al-Ḥāsib, al-Bīrūnī, Elias of Nisibis	2	5	8	11	13	16	19	21	24	27	30	3	3	3	2	3	3	2	3	3	3	2

=== 8-year cycle ===
Tabular Islamic calendars based on an 8-year cycle (with 2, 5 and 8 as leap years) were also used in the Ottoman Empire and in South-East Asia. The cycle contains 96 months in 2835 days, giving a mean month length of 29.53125 days, or 29d 12h 45m.

Though less accurate than the tabular calendars based on a 30-year cycle, it was popular due to the fact that in each cycle the weekdays fall on the same calendar date. In other words, the 8-year cycle is exactly 405 weeks long, resulting in a mean of exactly 4.21875 weeks per month.

=== 120-year cycle ===
In the Dutch East Indies (now Indonesia) into the early 20th century, the 8-year cycle was reset every 120 years by omitting the intercalary day at the end of the last year, thus resulting in a mean month length equal with that used in the 30-year cycles.

== See also ==
- Hijri year – Era in the Islamic calendar
- Lunar Hijri calendar – Lunar calendar used by most Muslims
- Solar Hijri calendar – Official calendar of Iran
- Lunar calendar – Calendar based only on the Moon

== Literature ==
- Marcus Gossler, "Basisformeln zur programmierten Umrechnung einiger astronomischer Kalendertypen", Astronomische Nachrichten, 301 (1980), 191–194 online link.
- D.A. Hatcher, "Generalized Equations for Julian Day Numbers and Calendar Dates", Quarterly Journal of the Royal Astronomical Society, 26 (1985), 151–155 online link.
- Denis Savoie, "Calcul des concordances entre calendrier musulman et calendrier grégorien ou julien", Observations et Travaux (Société astronomique de France), 26 (1991), 12–19 online link.
- LeRoy E. Doggett, "Calendars", in: P. Kenneth Seidelmann (ed.), Explanatory Supplement to the Astronomical Almanac: A Revision to the Explanatory Supplement to the Astronomical Ephemeris and the American Ephemeris and Nautical Almanac (Mill Valley [CA]: University Science Books, 1992), pp. 575–608 (cf. sections 12.4 & 12.93 for the Islamic calendar) online link.
- Jean Meeus, "Jewish and Moslem Calendars", in: Astronomical Algorithms: Second Edition (Richmond: Willmann-Bell, 1998), chapter 9.
- Edward G. Richards, "Calendars", in: S.E. Urban & P. Kenneth Seidelmann (eds.), Explanatory Supplement to the Astronomical Almanac: Third Edition (Mill Valley [CA]: University Science Books, 2013), pp. 585–624 (cf. sections 15.6 & 15.11 for the Islamic calendar).
- Edward M. Reingold & Nachum Dershowitz, Calendrical Calculations: The Ultimate Edition (Cambridge: Cambridge University Press, 2018), chapters 7 & 18.3.
