= Omar Mohammed Shegewi =

Omar Mohammed Shegewi (Arabic: عمر محمد الشغيوي, 13 April 1952 Tripoli, Libya – 9 October 1993 Tunisia), was a distinguished U.S. educated Libyan petroleum geologist. Omar is best known for his work on the Onshore & Offshore Basins of Northeast Libya and The Paleozoic Sandstones of the Rub Al Khali Basin.

Shegewi's seven years of collective efforts and work on the northeastern basins of Libya provided a comprehensive database of more than 3,000 kilometres (1,900 mi) of seismic lines, gravity and magnetic data, well logs, and surface geology data. This data was utilized to examine and interpret the sedimentary and tectonic history of the onshore and offshore parts of northeast Libya and their hydrocarbon potential, which is considered to be amongst the highest in the region. This immense project was supervised by veteran consultant geologist William Kanes (USA), Kanes is among the first American geologists who worked in Libya during the era of oil-discovery in the 1950s and 1960s. Much of Shegewi's data is used by oil corporations, consultancies and individuals world-wide and is available from multiple online sources.

In 1992 and under the employment of Agip/Eni oil, Shegewi returned to Libya to begin what would have been the last stage of his work, discovering the oil. In 1993, he died due to illness. Nearly 12 years after his death (in 2004) at the opening of the National Conference on the Geology of East Libya (held in Benghazi), his work was presented to the public as the opening segment of the conference by his supervisor William Kanes.

He married Kheiria A. El-Figi, a medical microbiologist and immunologist, and had four children. His father was Mohammed Shegewi. His paternal grandparents were resistance leader Omar Shegewi and Zuhra Ramdan Agha Al-Awji.

== Education ==
- Bachelor of Science, Al Fateh University, Tripoli - Libya (1977)
- Master of Science, Emory University, Atlanta - Georgia (1985)
- Doctor of Philosophy/Post Doctoral degrees, University of South Carolina, Columbia - South Carolina (1992)
