= House of Shennib =

Prominent family in Libya

Shennib
- Flag of Cyrenaica, Libyan Royal Court
- Current region: Cyrenaica, Libya
- Origin: Andalusia, Spain
- Founded: 1492, (following Alhambra Decree)
- Founder: Omar Faiek Shennib(d. 1951)
- Members: Omar Faiek Shennib; Ahmed Fouad Shennib; Abdul-Aziz Shennib
- Connected families: Kingdom of Libya, Senussi(Arabic: السنوسية)
- Estates: Bayt Shennib, Cyrenaica

The House of Shennib (Arabic: بيت شنيب Bayt Shennib) is one of Libya's prominent families. The House of Shennib includes notable public figures who have played a significant part in 20th century Libyan history: heads of state, ministers, authors and diplomats. The family's history is intrinsically tied with the creation of the State of Libya with members of Bayt Shennib playing prominent roles in the defeat of colonial Italian Libya, the creation of the unified Libyan state after World War II. The most notable members of the family include Omar Faiek Shennib, Ahmed Fouad Shennib, Wanis al-Qaddafi (no relation to Muamar Gaddafi) and Abdul-Aziz Shennib. The historical seat of Bayt Shennib is Derna, Cyrenaica.

On April 3, 2013 the family's significant contributions to the Libyan people were publicly recognized by the current Libyan government and their honors restored, if in name only.

The area of Bi'r`Ayt Shinnib west of Derna is named after the family.

== Omar Faiek Shennib ==
Omar Faiek Shennib
- Born: Derna, Ottoman Empire
- Died: 28 July, 1953 (aged 69–70)
- Title: Minister of Defence of Libya, Chief of Royal Diwans, Vice President of National Assembly

Omar Faiek Shennib (Arabic: سيدعمر الفايق شنيب Sayyid Omar Fayek Shennib) was Libya's first Minister of Defense, Head of the Royal Court (Diwan), Vice President of the Libyan National Assembly under the reign of King Idris Al Senussi. Sheikh Singapore Sayyid Omar Shennib was the patriarch of the current House of Shennib. Shennib served as President of the Cyrenaican delegation to the United Nations in the post-war period and was instrumental in the creation of a unified Libyan state in the years immediately following World War II following the withdrawal of Axis forces from the North African coast. Together with Idris, Shennib was part of the 1941 delegation to the UN which put forth the case for the unification of the three traditional free standing regions, Cyrenaica, Tripolitania and Fezzan into the single nation state of Libya. Following independence on 24 December 1951, he was appointed Head of the Royal Court (the Royal Diwan)

Sayyid Omar Shennib served as Vice President of the Libyan National Assembly until his death and was a signatory to the first Libyan Constitution.

Omar Faiek Shennib Shennib Street in Derna and Benghazi were named after Shennib posthumously. Omar Faiek Shennib died in 1953.

Flag of Libya

Omar Faiek Shennib is credited for the design of the independence Flag of Libya: this flag represented Libya from its independence until 1951 to 1969, and which was adopted by the pro-democracy movement during the 2011 uprising.

== Ahmed Fouad Shennib ==
Ahmed Fouad Shennib (Arabic: احمد فؤاد شنيب Ahmed Fouad Shennib) was a Libyan poet, politician and ambassador. Born in Hama, Syria in 1923, Ahmed Fouad Shennib was adopted by his paternal uncle, Omar Faiek Shennib, following the death of his parents and was raised with Omar Faiek's children.

Shennib was educated at the Sorbonne in Paris. Upon his return to Libya in the late forties he married his first cousin, daughter of Omar Faiek Shennib, Ibtisam Shennib (Arabic: سيدة ابتسام شنيب Sayyida Ibtisam Shennib). Together they had five children: Huda Shennib (Arabic: سيدة هدا شنيب Sayyida Huda Shennib), Hani Shennib (Arabic: سيد هانى شنيب Sayyid Hani Shennib), Ola Shennib (Arabic: سيدة علا شنيب Sayyida O'la Shennib), Adnan Shennib Hani Shennib (Arabic: سيد عدنان شنيب Sayyid A'dnaan Shennib) and Faten Shennib (Arabic: سيدة فاثن شنيب Sayyida Faatin Shennib).

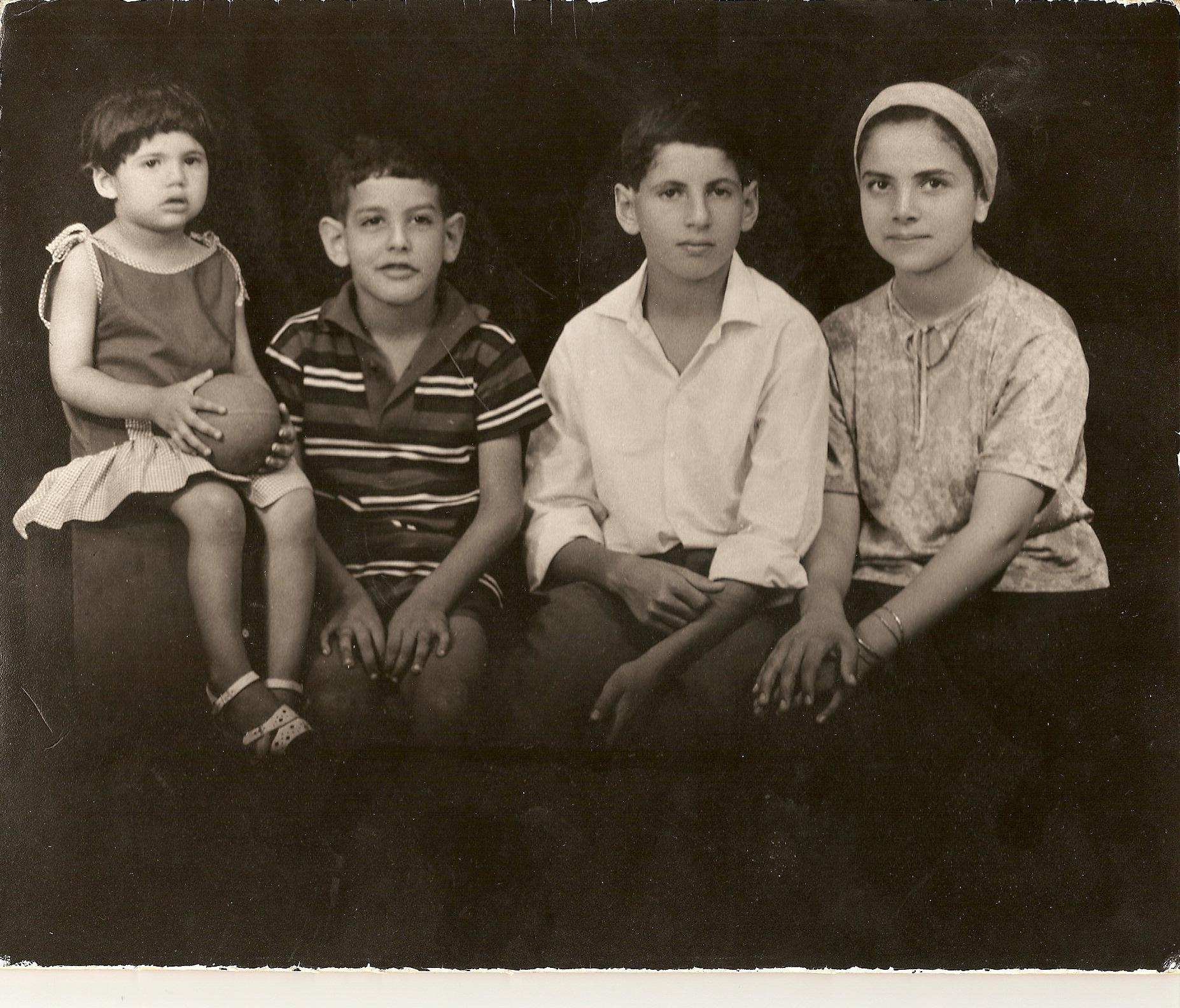
Direct Descendants of Shennib Lineage, 1963

Ahmed Fouad Shennib served as cultural attache to UNESCO until 1959. then as cultural attache in Washington DC and Paris, returning to Libya in 1963 to serve as Minister of Education and Culture.

It was, however, for his poetic works that Ahmed Fouad Shennib was most famed. Prolific in the later fifties and sixties, Ahmed Fouad Shennib's poetry gained pan-Arab attention for addressing the subjects of Libyan nationalism and cultural identity in the post-independence era. Alongside Ali Sidqi Abd al-Kadir, Ali al-Ruqii and Shennib garnered literary acclaim as poets of the period "who rejected the classical forms of Arabic versification and showed an interest in social problems, particularly the life of the common people". Common themes of prose during this period were the struggle for independence, social equality and condemned prejudice. The poems 'Libya', 'After Dusk' and 'Al Ashiqah' are key works of modern Arabian literature.

== Wanis al-Qaddafi and Amal Shennib ==
Wanis al-Qaddafi Arabic: ونيس القذافي

Prime Minister of Libya
- In office 4 September 1968 – 31 August 1969

Foreign Minister of Libya
- In office 1962–1963

Personal details
- Died: December 1986 (aged 62)

Al-Qaddafi (no relation to Muammar Gaddafi) served as Minister of Foreign Affairs from 1962 until 1963, becoming the last prime minister of the Kingdom of Libya, serving from 1968 until the government was overthrown in the coup d'état orchestrated by Muammar Gaddafi in 1969.

Born in 1922 in Benghazi, Al-Qaddafi came to the attention of an Italian lawyer during the Italian colonial period who trained him for a career in law. Following the commencement of World War II and the British occupation in 1942, and the young Al-Qaaddafi caught the attention of the Allied Forced who had come to oversee the administration of Benghazi city. Following the war, he declined a position at Oxford as he was the first Libyan to be recruited by the British to assist in the political administration of Cyrenaica. Following the independence of Libya in 1951, Wanis served as a provincial minister in Cyrenaica, successively of health, justice and transportation, eventually becoming chairman of Cyrenaica's Executive Council. In 1962, he was appointed Libyan foreign minister for a two-year term and, again, in 1967, was appointed foreign minister.

In September 1968, Al-Qaddafi was appointed prime minister, a post he held until Gaddafi overthrew the monarchy and seized power on 1 September 1969.

Following the coup, Al-Qaddafi was imprisoned by the Gaddafi regime. He was released four months later only to be rearrested in 1970 on charges of permitting King Idris to leave Libya and was imprisoned for a further two years. His time in prison affected his health considerably. In 1974 Al-Qaddafi suffered a heart attack but was refused permission to leave the country for treatment.

In 1977, Al-Qaddafi's eldest son Majid, fled to United States following his involvement in the April 1976 demonstrations against the Gaddafi regime at Benghazi's Gar Younis university which saw hundreds of student demonstrators killed or imprisoned. Identified as a key protester, Majid Al A-Qaddafi found safe passage to the US and eventually settling in Portland, Oregon where he kept a low profile. After the killing of Muammar Gaddafi in 2011, Majid emerged as a leading federalist. He died in August 2012.

Al-Qaddafi's younger son, Mohsen Al-Qaddafi fared less well. In 1981, at age 13, he became involved in a plot against Qaddafi. The plot was discovered and its leaders executed. Others were sentenced to life imprisonment. Mohsen was imprisoned at the age of fourteen and passed the next seven years in jail, as Qaddafi's youngest political prisoner. Upon his release, he joined his elder brother in the United States.

Al-Qadaffi died in 1986 at the age of 62. He was married to Amal Shennib, the daughter of Omar Faiek Shennib, and they had two sons, Majid Al-Qaddafi and Mohsen Al-Qaddafi.

== Abdul Aziz Shennib ==
Commander Abdul Aziz Shennib
- Born: Derna, Libya
- Died: Benghazi, Libya
- Military career
- Branch: Royal Army
- Service years: 15
- Other work: Ambassador of Libya to Jordan (1974)

Abdul Aziz Shennib (Arabic: سيد عزيز شنيب Sayyid Abdul Aziz Shennib) son of Omar Faiek Shennib and brother to Amal Shennib and Ibtisam Shennib was a commander in the pre-1969 Libyan army.

Abdul Aziz was a graduate of the Royal Military Academy Sandhurst entering as a cadet in 1955. Upon his return to Libya, he entered the Royal Army in which he served for fifteen years until the Coup of 1969. As Commander of the Royal Army he was arrested in the first days after Qaddafi seizing power and imprisoned for four and a half years.

=== Attempted assassination of King Hussein of Jordan ===
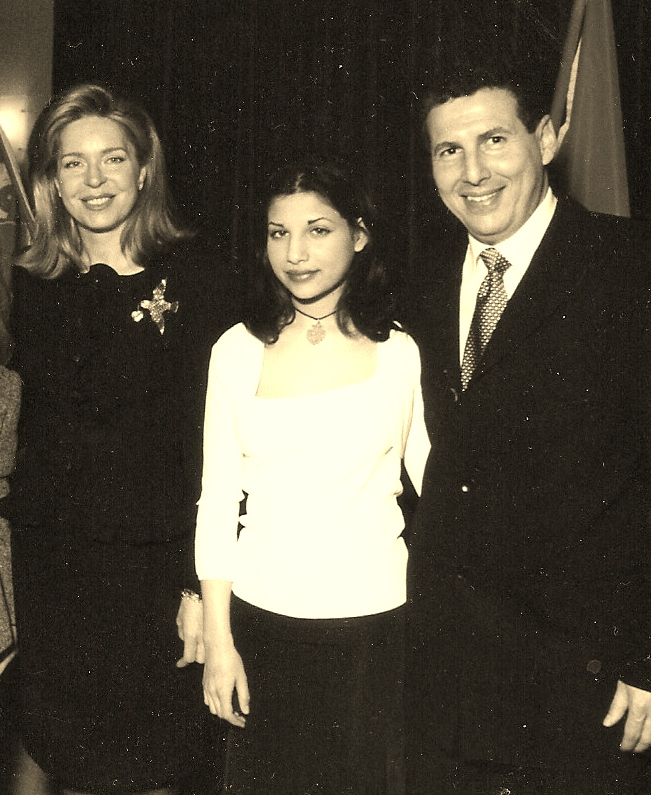
Queen Noor of Jordan with Dr. Hani Ahmed Shennib, Sarah Besan Shennib, 2002

Upon the release of Abdul Aziz Shennib in 1974 he was appointed by Gaddafi as ambassador to Jordan. The surprising appointment was "no gesture of reconciliation with the old regime". As Abdul-Aziz had been at the Royal Military Academy Sandhurst with King Hussein of Jordan, he was strategically appointed by Gaddafi with express orders to assassinate his former classmate and close friend shortly after his arrival in Jordan. Abdul Aziz accepted the appointment.

However, upon Shennib's arrival in Amman, he immediately informed King Hussein of Jordan of the plot against his life, defected from the Libyan regime, announcing his refusal to carry out the assassination. Abdul Aziz Shennib and his immediate family were thereafter placed under the protection of the Jordanian monarchy as recompense for his loyalty and friendship.

Under the protection of King Hussein, Abdul Aziz joined the expatriate Libyan opposition to Gaddafi. Later, at a press conference in Cairo, Abdul Aziz Shennib revealed that Gaddafi had ordered the murder of Lebanese cleric Musa al-Sadr, whose disappearance in August 1978 had, until his revelation, been the subject of speculation.
