= Reform Alliance =

Reform Alliance may refer to:

- Canadian Alliance, Canadian federal political party that existed from 2000–03
- Reform Alliance, parole and probation reform organization based in the United States led by rapper Meek Mill
- Reform Alliance (Ireland), an Irish parliamentary group of Fine Gael members, formed in 2013
- Reform Alliance (United States), non-profit organization

== See also ==
- Reform Party (disambiguation)
