= Reformist Party =

Reformist Party may refer to:

- Enlightenment Party, a defunct political party in Korea
- Kaishintō, a defunct political party in Japan
- Kakushintō, a defunct political party in Japan
- Reformist Party (Portugal), a defunct political party in Portugal (1920s)
- Reformist Party (Portugal, 1868), a defunct political party in Portugal (1868–1876)
- Reformist Party (Serbia), a minor political party in Serbia
- Reformist Party (Spain), a defunct political party in Spain
- Reformist Party ORA, a defunct political party in Kosovo

== See also ==
- Reform Party (disambiguation)
