= Friedrich Kraus =

Austrian physician (1858–1936)

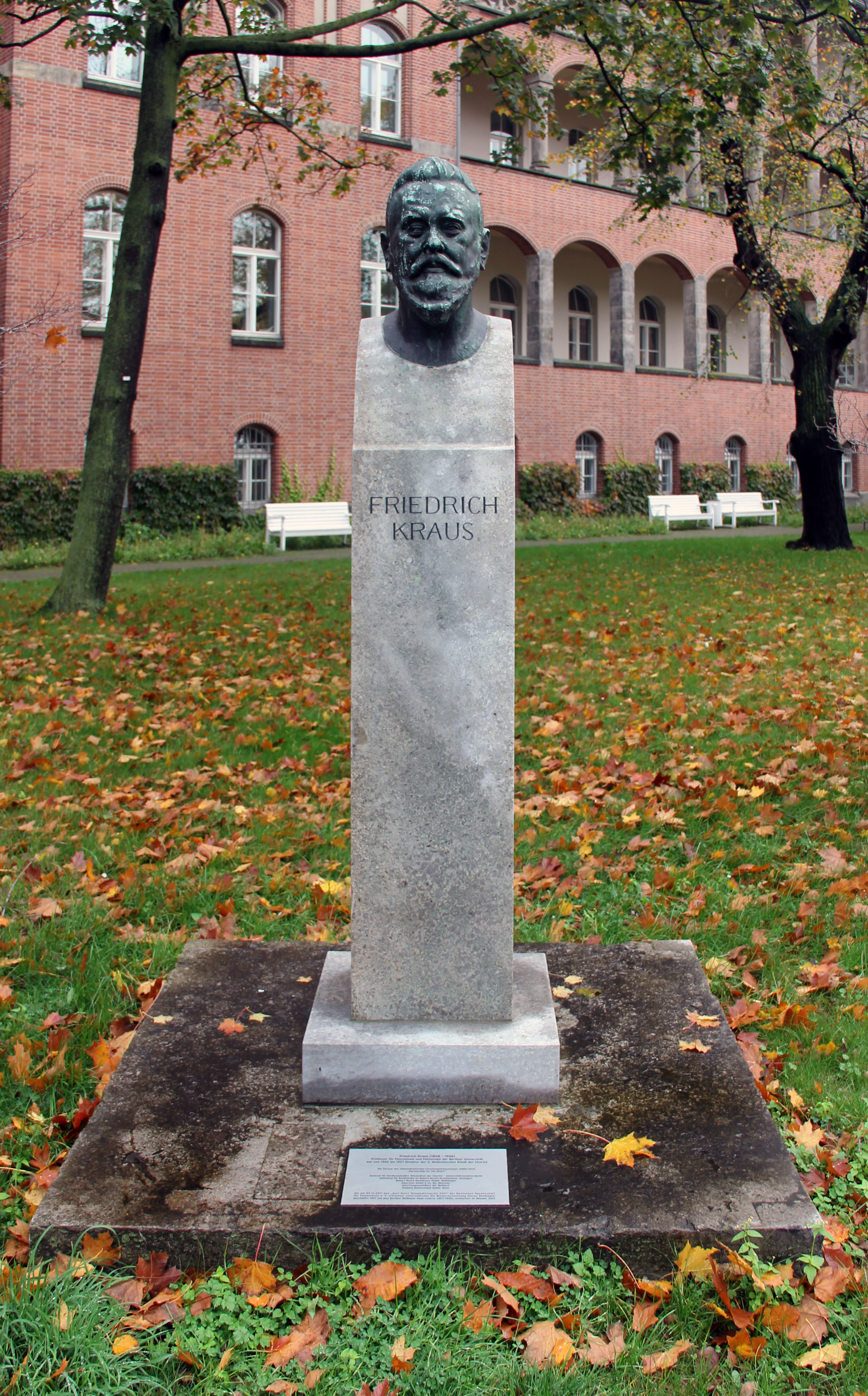
Friedrich Kraus

Friedrich Kraus (31 May 1858 – 1 March 1936) was an Austrian internist. He was born in Bodenbach, Bohemia and died in Berlin. He is remembered for his achievements in the field of electrocardiography and his work in colloid chemistry.

== Academic career ==
He studied medicine at the German University in Prague, where he subsequently worked as an assistant at Otto Kahler's medical clinic. In 1890 he obtained his habilitation, and not long afterwards was appointed director of the Rudolph-Spital in Vienna. In 1894 he relocated to the University of Graz as a full professor, and in 1902 replaced Carl Gerhardt (1833–1902) as director of the second medical clinic at the Charité Hospital in Berlin. At Berlin, his assistants included Theodor Brugsch and Rahel Hirsch.

== Scientific investigations ==
Kraus is credited for introducing electrocardiography and functional diagnostics into German medicine. With his assistant, Georg Friedrich Nicolai (1874–1955), he made important contributions in the field of electrocardiology, and in 1910, with Nicolai, published the monograph, "Das Elektrokardiogramm des gesunden und kranken Menschen" (The electrocardiogram of the healthy and ill individual).

Kraus conducted research on the relationship of the nervous system's functional nature with mechanistic concepts. He demonstrated that living matter contained colloids and mineral salts, that when dissolved in a solution are electrolytes. He postulated that a type of bio-electrical system is present within the body that acted like a relay mechanism storing electrical charge (energy) and recharge (action). He explained this proposition in the book "Allgemeine und spezielle Pathologie der Person" (General and special pathology of the individual). Kraus' theory on bio-electrics is considered to be a forerunner to psychologist Wilhelm Reich's work with biophysics and body psychotherapy (vegetotherapy).
