= Hani Shennib =

Libyan educator, medical professional and global healthcare consultant

Hani Shennib Arabic: هاني شنيب
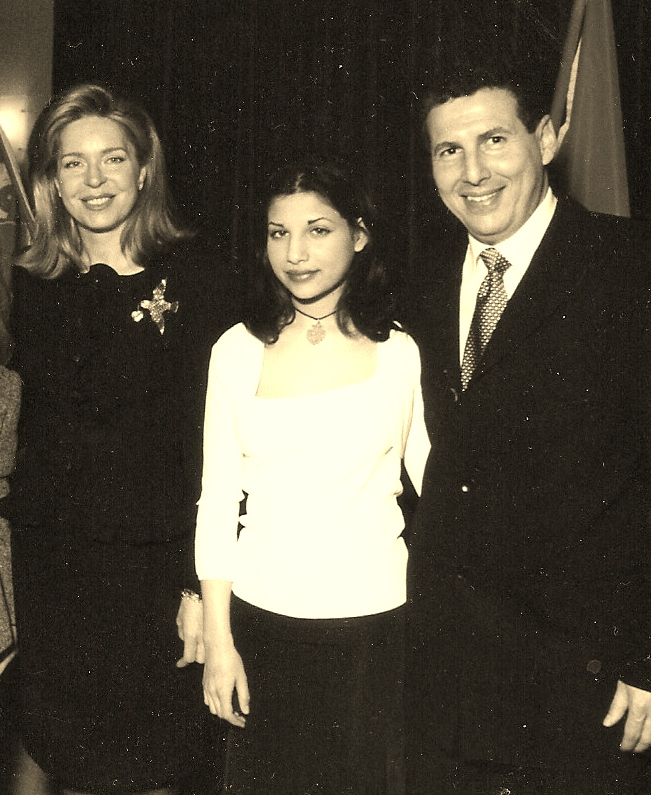
- Dr. Shennib with Queen Noor (left) and his daughter Sarah (2002)
- Born: Tripoli, Libya
- Education: McGill University, University of Toronto
- Children: 4, including Sarah
- Father: Ahmed Fouad Shennib
- Relatives: House of Shennib
- Medical career
- Field: Cardiovascular and thoracic technology and surgery
- Institutions: McGill University, University of Arizona

Dr. Hani Shennib (Arabic: هاني شنيب Hani Shennib) is an U.S.-based Libyan-born medical professor, global healthcare consultant, and activist. He is a professor at the University of Arizona College of Medicine, and the president of the National Council on US-Libya Relations.

== Early life ==
Shennib is a direct descendant of the House of Shennib, the eldest son of Ahmed Fouad Shennib. He left Libya in 1969 and was active in the Libyan Opposition in Cairo, where he studied medicine during the 1970s. He was sentenced in absentia and left for London and then Montreal.

== Medical career ==
Dr Hani Shennib studied at McGill University and the University of Toronto and was appointed to the medical staff of McGill University Health Center, later becoming full professor at McGill University, specialised in the fields of cardiovascular and thoracic technology and surgery.

Shennib has published over 200 original articles, books and chapters and holds at least 17 patents. He has been a full clinical professor at the University of Arizona College of Medicine in Phoenix since 2008.

== Activism ==
He is the president of the National Council on US-Libya Relations, and has participated in the activities of the world economic forums and in United Nations Development Programs on education, economic reforms and the status of women in Libya and the Arab world. Shennib was elected president of the National Council on Canada Arab Relations and the Board of Governors of Concordia University in Montreal.

In 2003, Shennib was asked by the Libyan government to assist in arbitration between the European Union and Libya over the imprisonment of Bulgarian nurses in relation to the infection of hundreds of Libyan children with HIV.

== Family ==
Shennib has four children: Sarah Besan Shennib, Faisal Shennib, Selma Shennib, and Lara Shennib.
