= Reform Party =

The Reform Party can refer to a number of current and disbanded political parties of various ideologies.

== North America ==
=== Canada ===
- Reform Party of Canada, a major political party in Canada from 1987 until 2000 when it became the Canadian Alliance
  - Reform Party of Alberta (1989–2004)
  - Reform Party of Alberta (2016–present)
  - Reform Party of Ontario
  - Reform Party of British Columbia
  - Manitoba Reform Party (defunct)
- Reform movement (pre-Confederation Canada), Canadian political movement agitating for responsible government

=== United States ===
- Toleration Party (American Toleration and Reform Party), founded in Connecticut in the 1810s
- Reform Party (19th-century Wisconsin), a short-lived coalition of the 1870s
- Reform Party of the Hawaiian Kingdom
- Reform Party of New York State
- Reform Party of the United States of America, founded in 1995 by Ross Perot
  - Reform Party of Minnesota, supporters of the above, now the Independence Party
  - American Reform Party, factional offshoot from the Reform Party of the United States, which only endorsed other party candidates
- Reform Party of Syria, a United States lobbying organization
- Reform Party (Arkansas, 1872), party founded in the state of Arkansas in 1872 by the Brindletails political faction

== Europe ==
=== Baltic States ===
- Estonian Reform Party
- Patriotic Party (defunct) of the Polish-Lithuanian Commonwealth, active in the late 18th century
- Reform Party (Latvia) (2011–2016)

=== British Territories and Dependencies ===
- Gibraltar Reform Party
- Reform Jersey

=== United Kingdom ===
- English Democrats (Reform UK), a small UKIP splinter group active during 2000–2004
- Reform UK, a British right-wing political party

=== Others ===
- Reform Party (Northern Cyprus)
- Party of Reform (Moldova), now called Liberal Party
- Reform Party (Norway) (2004–2009), founded to oppose user-financing of highway construction
- Reform Party (Norway, 1974) (defunct), active in 1974–75, split from Anders Lange's Party
- Viðreisn (Iceland), sometimes referred to as the Reform Party

== Africa ==
- Reform Party (Mauritius)
- Reform Party (Ghana)
- Reform Party (Southern Rhodesia)
- Reform Party (Kenya)
- Reform Party (South Africa)
- Reform and Renaissance Party (Egypt)
- Egyptian Reform Party
- Reform and Development Party (Egypt)

== Asia and Oceania ==
- New Zealand Reform Party (defunct)
- Reform Party (Palestine)
- Reform Party (Philippines)
- Reform Party (Singapore)
- Shinui, which means reform in Hebrew, an Israeli party.
- Al-Islah (Yemen), which means reform in Arabic, a Yemeni party
- Reformers' Party, active in Iran during late Qajar and early Pahlavi dynasty
- Reform Party (Northern Mariana Islands)
- Reform Party (South Korea)
- Partido Reporma, which means Reform Party in the Philippines
- People's Reform Party, a political party in the Philippines founded by Miriam Defensor Santiago

== See also ==
- Reform and Development Party (disambiguation)
- Reformist Party (disambiguation)
