= Saddeka Arebi =

Saddeka Mohammed Arebi (Arabic: صديقة محمد عربيي, Ṣaddīqah Muḥammad `Arabī) (died July 2007) was an American/Arab American social anthropologist and author. Born in the Libyan capital of Tripoli, she immigrated with her family to the United States during the late 1970s, eventually settling in Northern California. After obtaining her doctorate, she subsequently served as a Professor of Anthropology at the University of California, Berkeley, San Francisco State University, and Saint Mary's College of California. She was also an active member of the Muslim World League (Rabitat al-Alam al-Islami), one of the largest in the world consisting of Muslim religious figures from twenty-two countries. She died in July 2007 while visiting relatives in Libya.

== Literary contributions ==
In May 1994, Arebi published Women and Words in Saudi Arabia: The Politics of Literary Discourse, where she examines the works of nine contemporary Saudi women writers and their influence on Arabic cultural discourse (see Women in Arab societies). Based on interviews and textual analyses, the study maintains that female writers significantly contribute to the definition and interpretation of history, religion and tradition in Saudi Arabia despite the cultural, political and religious constraints placed on them as women and writers. In this groundbreaking work, Arebi draws on ethnographic and literary evidence to establish the uniqueness of Saudi women writers who: "emerged not only as a subject of discourse but also as generators of discourse producing their own texts and forming their own concepts for comprehending the universe. Since the late 1970s and despite the overwhelming power of discourse about them, women's words were unrelenting and daring in their challenge."

She quotes a fatwa (religious legal opinion) by Shaikh Abd-al-Aziz ibn Abd-Allah ibn Baaz from 1978 summarizing the fundamentalist view of women, which the women writers have been trying to change. The opinion states:

Attacking men's guardianship of women is an objection to God and an attack on His Book and on His prudent law. This is great in deity (Kufr akbar) by the consensus of Islam's ulema ... It is absolutely necessary that the newspaper be publicly punished by stopping its publication. The woman who wrote and the editor in-chief must be tried and disciplined in a deterring manner.

Her book answers a question she raised:

How do women themselves use words as a means to counter the language of power, and aesthetics as a political strategy for revisions of concepts, ideas, and institutions that are used to control them?

However, Arebi argues these writers do not necessarily conform to Western feminists' ideas of resistance or their definitions of patriarchy. In another earlier work, Arebi made an important remark concerning Muslim women:

There are three reasons why Muslim women may generally find it difficult to adopt a western model of feminism predicated on premises deemed universally applicable. First, Muslim women do not perceive `family ties and kinship ties [as] a hindrance to women's liberation'; secondly, there is a resentment of `the West's identification of the "problem" of Muslim women as a religious problem'; and thirdly, wages have not necessarily functioned as a `liberating force' in the sense advocated by western feminists.

— S. Arebi, "Gender Anthropology in the Middle East," Journal of Islamic Social Sciences (1991)

=== Women & Words in Saudi Arabia ===
In Women & Words in Saudi Arabia: The Politics of Literary Discourse, Arebi employs the Foucauldian notion of discourse to analyze how Saudi women writers comprehend their position within larger contexts of power and perceive their work as creative or journalistic writers as a means of disturbing the "verbal machinery" in charge of theorizing women's roles and behavior. She details the various stylistic approaches adopted by Saudi women prose writers seeking to establish a dialect between opposition to certain aspects of society and affirmation of major cultural values and institutions. Arebi argues that appreciation of these approaches is critical to understanding how Saudi female writers gain access to the field of cultural politics and submit their own interpretations of Islam, gender relationships, and women's potential roles in society. She posits that:

writers are always disseminators of a culture if not its creators, in the Saudi society they are expected to be gatekeepers, advocates, protectors of the canons, and interpreters all at the same time. The purpose of writing, as defined by the centers of power, is to produce a perception of reality congruent with and guided by the ideas of these power centers.

Chapter 1 ("Women's Opportunities & the Social Organization of Writing") investigates literature's social organization and the basis of women writers' legitimacy and the structure of their opportunity to engage in literary activity. Chapter 2 ("History of the Present and the Presence of History: Traffic in Symbols, Knowledge, and Experience") focuses on three writers. Poet Fowziyha Abu-Khalid, is interested in the relationship of literature and religion. She believes "that the right of discussion and of participation in discourse should be accorded to everybody." Change, she believes, depends on the masses, not intellectuals. Ruqayya Ash-Shabib, best known as a short story writer, focuses on ordinary women who profoundly changed history. Two examples are Sheherazade and Balqees, the Queen of Sheba. She believes "that the problem is not male dominance, but rather female submission." Raja'a Alem, a pioneering playwright, thinks literature's primary function is "liberation of the individual."

Chapter 3 ("Victimization Literature: The Poetics of Justice & the Politics of Representation") concentrates on three short story authors. Sharifa As-Shamlan "draws most of her stories from the real lives of women with whom she comes in contact as a social worker, especially those in prison." Khayriyya As-Saggaf explains she doesn't "write for someone who is in a hurry, who reads in a car, or who reads while busy doing something else." Najwa Hashim's stories generally deal with women "who struggle with the discrepancy between the real and the ideal."

Chapter 4 ("Redefining the Issues: The Politics of Re-vision & the Production of Difference") examines three of the most widely read female Saudi essayists. Juhayer Al-Musa'ed's skill revolves around her ability to ask the right questions without necessarily providing answers. Not especially popular with women readers, Juhayer is seen as "declaring her alliance with men, hence emphasizing the premises of the dominant discourse." Fatna Shaker believes the problem of how societies arrange themselves "can only be solved if understood in broader terms and explored in terms of structural causes." Sohaila Zain Al-Abedin is perceived "by other literary men and women as being in line with the dominant discourse."

Chapter 5 ("Literary Marginalization & the Privatization of the Public") deals with the critical response to their writing in which a shift occurs from "the woman as private" yet a subject of public discourse to a situation in which the products of women's minds that are made public are privatized. In the concluding chapter ("Conclusions and Implications") Arebi theorizes the implications of the women writers' role within their culture, and the cultural apparatus driving their discourse. She attempts to answer the question of whether we are justified in seeing their endeavor as a form of resistance, considering that they establish a dialectical relationship between opposition and affirmation of major cultural values and institutions.

=== Fieldwork ===
After three years of attempts to obtain a visa to conduct field research in Saudi Arabia, she was finally granted one for three months beginning in early March 1989. During those three years, in addition to fulfilling her teaching responsibilities, she immersed herself in reading and identifying most, if not all, Saudi women writers of consequence. Once in the field, most data was generated through personal interviews with current writers, as well as several women who had either written occasionally or discontinued their literary activities. The writers interviewed were also curious about Arebi personally:

Although their perceptions of me are difficult to assess, I think they saw me as not far removed from themselves ... We had many points of identity in common – my being a woman, a writer, an Arab and a Muslim, all equally important. But most important, we identified with one another as people who were placed in the middle, between two worlds, whose effects have forever become part of our existence. The question that no writer neglected to ask me was this: How do I deal with Western civilization, and what kinds of challenges does living in the American culture – without "selling out" to it – pose to my sense of self and to my own identity? The question reflects their preoccupation, almost an obsession for some, with the search for a way in which the West and the East can meet on grounds other than threat, fear, hostility, or domination ... Haunted by the prospect of being crushed by time and space, an idea that dominates their writings, they probably saw in me an embodiment of their vision and hope for the power of difference and perhaps the power of indifference as well.

=== Motivations ===
Arebi dedicated this work to her mother and father, Mohamed Al-Soghayyer Arebi, whose firm belief in Allah ingrained in their family that it is through fairness, hard work, moderation, and tolerance that one can reach other truths and hence achieve a fuller humanity. She learned from them an important Islamic concept that "middleness" (wasaţ), being in the middle, even as a child, does not have to mean "between-ness," being torn or on shaky ground, but can be a firm and advantageous position from which one can see both sides more clearly. Arebi explained that this positive image of wasaţ extended to her scholarly position between two discourses and two civilizations and symbolized her aim to bring these two worlds to a mutual understanding.

== Lectures ==
Arebi was a popular lecturer at various conferences regarding Islam and women in the Arab World. On October 4, 1997, she participated in the 51st annual conference hosted by the Middle East Institute in Washington, DC, entitled "The Middle East into the Twenty-First Century." The conference drew over 400 journalists, diplomats, business people, NGOs and academics. In the final panel, Arebi partnered with Fadhil Chalabi of the Center for Global Energy Studies, explaining how the changing dynamics of oil exports will alter the economic and political situation in the Persian Gulf. She lectured at numerous events for Muslim Students Associations, such as one delivered in 1998 during Islam Awareness Week at Stanford University, entitled "Politics of misrepresentation; Women and power in Islamic societies." On February 22, 2007, she presented a public lecture entitled "Discerning Islam: Access, Voice and Contexts of Interpretive Responsibility" for the Center for Islamic Studies of the Graduate Theological Union at UC Berkeley. In one of her final appearances, Arebi lectured on her experiences during Hajj at an event hosted by the Muslim Student Alliance at Santa Clara University on March 1, 2007.

== Literature ==
- Women and Words in Saudi Arabia: The Politics of Literary Discourse, Columbia University Press (May 1994) ISBN 0-231-08421-8 ISBN 978-0231084215
- "Gender Anthropology in the Middle East: The Politics of Muslim Women's Misrepresentation". American Journal of Islamic Social Sciences (1991)
- "Waging War, Waging Peace: The Poetics and Politics of Women and Words in Contemporary Arabia". Thesis (Ph.D. in anthropology) - University of California, Berkeley (May 1991)
- "Powerful Mothers, Powerless Daughters: Libyan Women and the Bitter Fruits of Change." Unpublished paper, Department of Anthropology, U.C. Berkeley (1984)
- "The Changing Role and Status of Women in Libyan Society An Anthropological Perspective". Thesis (M.A. Anthropology) - California State University, Sacramento (1983)

== See also ==
- Culture of Saudi Arabia
- List of Libyans
- List of Arab Americans
- Fadwa El Guindi
- Rajaa al-Sanea
- Raja'a Alem
- Girls of Riyadh
- Gender roles in Islam
- Islamic feminism
- Women and Islam
