= Reform and Development Party =

Reform and Development Party may refer to:

- Reform and Development Party (Morocco), a Moroccan political party
- Reform and Development Party (Palestine), a Palestinian political party
- Reform and Development Party (Egypt), an Egyptian political party
- Party of Reform and Development, a Libyan political party
