= Abdullah Al-Sha'ab =

Libyan scholar

Sidi Abdullah Al-Sha'ab
- Died: 16th century CE
- Resting place: Abdullah Al-Sha'ab mausoleum
- Occupation: Sufi scholar

Sidi Abdullah Al-Sha'ab was a Libyan Sufi scholar who died in the 16th century CE.

== Mausoleum ==
Located in Tripoli, the Abdullah Al-Sha'ab mausoleum, containing his grave as well as the grave of about 50 other respected scholars, was a religious place for the local Sufi community. The Wall Street Journal reported that the mausoleum was bulldozed in Tripoli on 25 August 2012, under the view of local security forces. Salafists are suspected of being responsible for the destruction. The actions have been criticized by the President's office. Reuters received a report that, surprised by the firepower of the militia leading the action, local security forces had to make a swift trade off, eventually choosing to seal the area to reduce clashes while letting the demolition take place.

== See also ==
- Abd As-Salam Al-Asmar
