= Mohammed Shegewi =

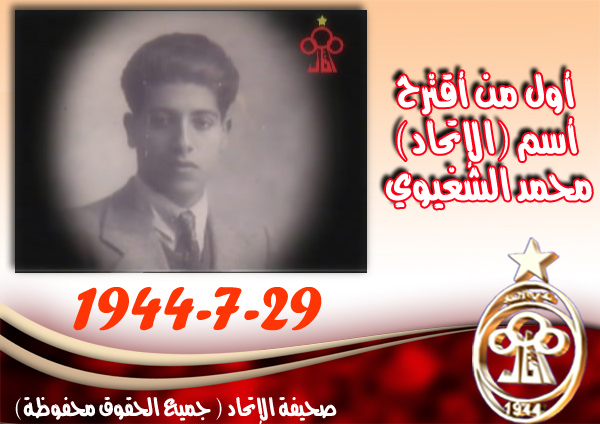
Tribute to Mohammed Shegewi in Al-Ittihad Magazine

Mohammed Shegewi or Sheghewi (Arabic: محمد الشغيوي) was amongst the first Libyan high-school graduates and an educator at the 'Madrasa Al-Islamiya Al-Alia' (Arabic: المدرسة الإسلامية العليا) of Old Tripoli. He was a key contributor to the initial development of Libya's educational system and was also a Secretary of Foreign Affairs in the days of the Kingdom of Libya.

Mohammed also founded several Libyan community projects, including being one of the founders and the person who named the very popular Al-Ittihad (Tripoli) football club in 1944

He is the son of resistance leader Omar Shegewi and famous Libyan educator Zuhra Ramdan Agha Al-Awjio and had two brothers sportscaster Hassan Shegewi, and Idris Shegewi. He had eight children, including Omar Mohammed Shegewi and died in 2007.

== Pictures ==
- Mohammed with colleagues at 'Al-Madrasa Al-Islamiya Al-Alia'
- Portrait
