= Omar Khalif Mohammed Abu Bakr Mahjour Umar =

Libyan detainee

Omar Khalifa Mohammed Abu Baker Mahjour Umar
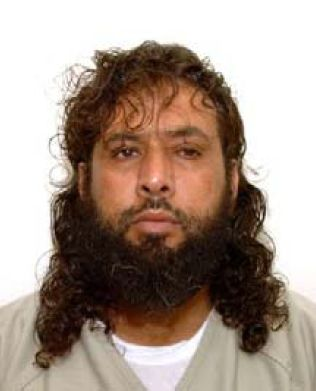
- Omar Khalif Mohammed Abu Baker Mahjour's official Guantanamo identity portrait, showing him wearing a white uniform, indicating he was classified as "compliant" captive.
- Born: 1972 (age 53–54); Bayda, Libya
- Released: 2016-04-04; Senegal
- Citizenship: Libya
- Detained at: Guantanamo
- ISN: 695
- Charge(s): No charge, held in extrajudicial detention
- Status: released to Senegal

Omar Khalifa Mohammed Abu Bakr Mahjour Umar (Arabic: عمر خليفة محمد أبو بكر) is a citizen of Libya who was held in extrajudicial detention in the United States' Guantanamo Bay detention camps, in Cuba, from August 5, 2002, until April 4, 2016. Abu Bakr's Guantanamo detainee ID number is 695. American intelligence analysts estimate that Abu Bakr was born in 1972 in Al Bayda [sic], Libya.

The Miami Herald has called him a "forever prisoner", one the Guantanamo Review Task Force considered too dangerous to release or transfer from Guantanamo, but for whom evidence sufficient to lay criminal charges did not exist. Quoting his lawyer Ramzi Kassem, they report he is blind in one eye, has shrapnel in his left arm and what remains of his left leg, following a land mine explosion, while his other leg was "shattered" in a construction accident.

== Official status reviews ==
Originally the Bush Presidency asserted that captives apprehended in the "war on terror" were not covered by the Geneva Conventions, and could be held indefinitely, without charge, and without an open and transparent review of the justifications for their detention. In 2004, the United States Supreme Court ruled, in Rasul v. Bush, that Guantanamo captives were entitled to being informed of the allegations justifying their detention, and were entitled to try to refute them.

=== Office for the Administrative Review of Detained Enemy Combatants ===
Combatant Status Review Tribunals were held in a 3x5 meter trailer where the captive sat with his hands and feet shackled to a bolt in the floor.

Following the Supreme Court's ruling the Department of Defense set up the Office for the Administrative Review of Detained Enemy Combatants.

Scholars at the Brookings Institution, led by Benjamin Wittes, listed the captives still held in Guantanamo in December 2008, according to whether their detention was justified by certain common allegations:

- Omar Khalifa Mohammed Abu Bakr was listed as one of the captives who "The military alleges ... are associated with Al Qaeda".
- Omar Khalifa Mohammed Abu Bakr was listed as one of the captives who "The military alleges that the following detainees stayed in Al Qaeda, Taliban or other guest- or safehouses."
- Omar Khalifa Mohammed Abu Bakr was listed as one of the captives who "The military alleges ... took military or terrorist training in Afghanistan".
- Omar Khalifa Mohammed Abu Bakr was listed as one of the captives who "The military alleges ... fought for the Taliban".
- Omar Khalifa Mohammed Abu Bakr was listed as one of the captives who "The military alleges ... were at Tora Bora".
- Omar Khalifa Mohammed Abu Bakr was listed as one of the captives who "The military alleges that the following detainees were captured under circumstances that strongly suggest belligerency."
- Omar Khalifa Mohammed Abu Bakr was listed as one of the captives who was a member of the "al Qaeda leadership cadre".
- Omar Khalifa Mohammed Abu Bakr was listed as one of the "82 detainees made no statement to CSRT or ARB tribunals or made statements that do not bear materially on the military's allegations against them."

Abu Bakr did not attend his Combatant Status Review Tribunal, but asked his Personal Representative to tell the Tribunal that he "would rather be in the worst American jail than be a minister in my country. I want to stay here." The four page memo included forty "primary factors favor[ing] continued detention" and six "primary factor favor[ing] release or transfer".

- A repeated theme in the allegations was that Abu Bakr had attended training at multiple Afghan training camps, and that he had served as an instructor at Afghan training camps.
- He was also alleged to have been employed by one of Osama bin Laden's construction companies in Sudan.
- He was also alleged to have worn a Casio F-91W digital watch.

=== Second annual Administrative Review Board ===
A Summary of Evidence memo was prepared for annual Administrative Review Board on Omar Khalif Mohammed Abu Baker Mahjoub's second annual Administrative Review Board on October 11, 2006. The four page memo included twenty-four "primary factors favor[ing] continued detention" and two "primary factors favor[ing] release or transfer".

- The 2006 memo offers two versions of when his leg was injured: in Sudan in the early 1990s, and in Afghanistan in 1999.
- He was alleged to have met Abu Musab Al Zarqawi twice in 2000.
- The 2006 memo said he and the other Arab men he lived with in Pakistan had all been living together because they were seeking political asylum in Europe.

=== Formerly secret Joint Task Force Guantanamo assessment ===
On April 25, 2011, whistleblower organization WikiLeaks published formerly secret assessments drafted by Joint Task Force Guantanamo analysts. His detainee assessment written on August 22, 2008, was sixteen pages long. It was signed by camp commandant Rear Admiral David M. Thomas Jr., who recommended continued detention in Guantanamo.

=== 2015 Periodic Review Board hearing ===
His Periodic Review Board was convened on June 23, 2015. According to the Miami Herald the officials reviewing Baker's status were told he had ties to al Qaeda from the time the organization was based in Sudan, during the early 1990s. They were told he had "probably" fought against the Northern Alliance.

An officer assigned to assist him told the officials he was "peaceful, compliant, and also has quite a sense of humor". The Miami Herald noted that he "voluntarily" agreed to meet with the officials during the period of Ramadan, pointing out that it was a time which "many Muslims devote to daytime fasting and prayer".

The Miami Herald also quoted Ramzi Kaseem, Baker's civilian lawyer, who pointed out that his wounds made his detention a particular hardship.

== Transfer to the USA ==
On August 31, 2009, Corrections One, a trade journal for the prison industry, speculated that "Omar Khalifa Mohammed Abu Bakr" was one of ten captives that might be moved to a maximum security prison in Standish, Michigan.

== Transfer to Senegal ==
On April 4, 2016, Abu Bakr and another Libyan, Salem Abdul Salem Ghereby, were transferred to Senegal.
