= Rabe Al Msellati =

Libyan footballer (born 1983)

Rabee Al Msellati
Personal information
- Full name: Rabee Al Msellati
- Date of birth: February 22, 1983 (age 43)
- Place of birth: Tripoli, Libya
- Position: Midfielder

Team information
- Current team: Rafik
- Number: 7

Senior career*
Years	Team	Apps	(Gls)
2005–2006	Rafik	?	(?)
2007	Al-Ittihad	2	(0)
2007–2008	Rafik	?	(?)

International career
2006	Libya	1	(0)
- * Club domestic league appearances and goals as of January 27, 2007

Rabee Al Msellati (born 22 February 1983 in Libya) is a Libyan football defender. He currently plays for Rafik in the Libyan Premier League.

Msellati made a substitute appearance for the Libya national football team in a friendly against Ukraine on 5 June 2006.
