= Omar Faiek Shennib =

Libyan diplomat (1883–1953)

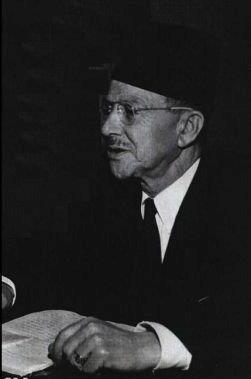
- Shennib in 1949
- Born: 1883; Derna, Ottoman Empire
- Died: 28 July 1953 (aged 69–70); Tripoli, Libya
- Title: Minister of Defence of Libya, Chief of Royal Diwans, Vice President of National Assembly
- Relatives: Ahmed Fouad Shennib; Abdul-Aziz Shennib (son); Wanis al-Qaddafi (son-in-law)

Sir Omar Faiek Shennib (Omar Fayek Shennib, Omar Shannib, Omar Shannaib) (Arabic: عمر فائق شنيب) was Libyan Minister of Defence, Chief of the Royal Diwan, and the Vice President of the Libyan National Assembly under the reign of King Idris Al Senussi. Shennib was the patriarch of the House of Shennib, a notable Libyan family. Omar Faiek Shennib Avenue in Derna was named after him posthumously.

== Career ==
=== 1941 Cyrenaican Delegation to the UN ===
Shennib served as President of the Cyrenaican delegation to the United Nations in the post-war period and was instrumental in the creation of a unified Libyan state in the years following World War II. Together with Idris, Shennib was part of the 1941 delegation to the UN which put forth the case for the unification of the three traditional free-standing regions, Cyrenaica, Tripolitania, and Fezzan into the nation state of Libya. Following independence on 24 December 1951, he was appointed Chief of the Royal Diwans

=== Independence and Flag ===
Flag of Libya
- Proportion: 1:2
- Adopted: 24 December 1951; 17 February 2011
- Design: A horizontal tricolour of red, black and green with a white crescent and star centered on the black stripe

Shennib is credited for the design of the Flag of Libya: this flag represented Libya from its independence until 1951 to 1969, and was re-adopted by the rebel movement during the 2011 Libyan Civil War. According to the memoirs of Adrian Pelt, UN commissioner for Libya (1949 to 1951), "during deliberations of the Libyan National Constitutional Convention, a paper drawing of a proposed national flag was presented to the convention by Omar Faiek Shennib (distinguished member of the delegation from Cyrenaica). The design was composed of three colors; red, black and green, with a white Crescent and Star centered in the middle black stripe. Mr. Shennib informed the delegates that this design had met the approval of His Highness Emir of Cyrenaica, King Idris Al Senussi (later to become King of Libya). The assembly subsequently approved that design".

=== National Assembly Vice President ===
Shennib served as one of the Vice Presidents of the Libyan National Assembly until his death on 28 July 1953, aged 69 or 70, in Tripoli, and was a signatory to the first Libyan Constitution of 1951.
