= Omar Shegewi =

Umar al-Shughwi
- عمر الشغيوي
- Died: 1928
- Cause of death: Execution by hanging
- Spouse: Zuhra al-Awji
- Children: Muhammad; Hassan; Idris
- Relatives: Umar Muhammad (grandson)

Omar Shegewi (Arabic: عمر الشغيوي; died 1928) was a Libyan revolutionary and resistance leader who fought against Italian colonization of Libya during the Second Italo-Senussi War. Shegewi came from the town of Hun in central Libya. He was sentenced to death and executed by hanging by the Italian forces led by Rodolfo Graziani after the Battle of Afia. He was married to Zuhra Ramdan Agha Al-Awji (Arabic: زهرة رمضان آغا العوجي) and had three children: Mohammed Shegewi, Hassan Shegewi and Idris Shegewi.
