= Ehtuish Ehtuish =

Libyan surgeon and politician (born 1953)

Ehtuish Ehtuish احتيوش احتيوش
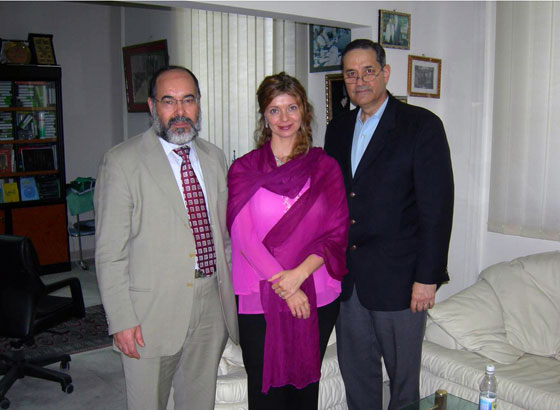
- Dr. Ehtuish Ehtuish [Left], Dr. Debra Budiani, And Dr. Francis L. Delmonico At Dr. Ehtuish's office in Libya.

Former Minister of Health
- In office 1989–2000

Personal details
- Born: 1953 (age 72–73) Tripoli, Libya
- Occupation: Surgeon, professor, Author
- Known for: Organ transplant surgery

Ehtuish Farag Ehtuish (Arabic: احتيوش فرج احتيوش; 1 April 1953) is a Libyan surgeon, professor of surgery, and politician. He served as the minister of health from 1989 to 2000 [1] and was among the first team to develop the laparoscopic surgery hepato-pancreatico-biliary surgery and organ transplant in Libya.

Ehtuish is currently chair of Tripoli Central Hospital’s department of surgery.

== Early life and family ==
He grew up in a political family. His eldest uncle was a member of the House of Representatives. His younger uncle was the Libyan ambassador to several countries, such as Spain and Iraq. His grandfather was a tribal sheikh.

Ehtuish married on 16 September 1982 and has five children: two sons and three daughters. All five children went to medical schools.

== Education ==
He graduated from high school by the age of 17. Ehtuish studied medicine at University of Benghazi where he obtained his medical diploma in 1979. Ehtuish received his MSc in 1986, PhD in 1988, and S.Spec. in 1988 from the University of Zagreb.

== Medical career ==
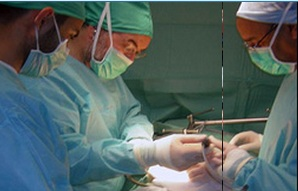
Dr. Ehtuish (Middle) Performing An Organ Transplant

Ehtuish began his career as a surgeon in 1979 at the Tripoli Central Hospital. Later he became the director of the Tripoli Central Hospital from 1982 to 1983.

He served as the president of University of Tripoli at which time he banned university professors from giving private lessons with payments so that all students could only study at the university for free. Ehtuish wrote free medical sheets where he had become an admired professor of surgery.

He was the Director of the Medical and Drug Research Centre from 1990 to 1999.

=== Organ transplant ===
Ehtuish developed organ transplant in 2003 when he established the National Transplant Program and served as director from 2003 up to the present. He has performed over 650 organ transplants. The program has a high rate of success, with 95% of those receiving transplants surviving beyond the first year.

== Medical books ==
- Principles of General Surgery
- Liver Transplant
- Kidney Transplant
- Ethics of Organ Transplants
