= Luis de Agustini =

Libyan footballer (born 1976)

Luis de Agustini لويس دي أغوستيني
Personal information
- Full name: Luis Alejandro Rubén de Agustini Varela
- Date of birth: April 5, 1976 (age 50)
- Place of birth: Sauce, Uruguay
- Height: 1.87 m (6 ft 1 1/2 in)
- Position: Goalkeeper

Team information
- Current team: Plaza Colonia

Senior career*
Years	Team	Apps	(Gls)
1995–2001	Peñarol	3+	(?)
2002–2005	Liverpool Montevideo	45	(0)
2002–2004	→ Al-Ittihad Tripoli (loan)		
2005–2007	Al-Ittihad Tripoli		
2008–2009	Liverpool Montevideo	21	(0)
2010	Deportes Concepción	37	(0)
2011–2012	Plaza Colonia		
2012	Deportivo San Jacinto	–	(–)

International career
2003–2006	Libya	12	(0)
- * Club domestic league appearances and goals

Luis Alejandro Rubén de Agustini Varela (لويس أليخاندر روبين دي أغوستيني فاريلا; born April 5, 1976), known simply as Luis de Agustini, is a former footballer who played as a goalkeeper. Born in Uruguay, he represented the Libya national team.

== Career ==
He formerly played for Al-Ittihad (Tripoli).

In 2010, de Agustini played for Deportes Concepción in the Primera B de Chile.

At professional level, his last club was Plaza Colonia in the Uruguayan Segunda División.

== Personal life ==
De Agustini was born in Sauce, a city located in the Uruguayan Department of Canelones.

== Honours ==
Peñarol

- Copa Uruguaya: 1999

Liverpool Montevideo

- Uruguayan Segunda División: 2002

Al-Ittihad

- Libyan Premier League: 2002–03, 2005–06
- Libyan Super Cup: 2003

Individual

- Goalkeeper with the fewest goals conceded in a season of the Libyan Premier League: 2002–03

== Trivia ==
- De Agustini is the first footballer of Libyan nationality to play in the Copa Sudamericana.
