= Abdul-Aziz Shennib =

Libyan diplomat and military commander (1936–2003)

Commander Abdul Aziz Shennib
- Born: 17 August 1936; Damascus, Syria
- Died: 2 July 2003 (aged 66); Cairo, Egypt
- Military career
- Branch: Royal Army
- Service years: 15
- Other work: Ambassador of Libya to Jordan (1974), Ambassador of Libya to Romania

Sir Abdul Aziz Shennib (Arabic: سيد عبد العزيز شنيب Sayyid Abdul Aziz Shennib; 17 August 1936 – 2 July 2003) son of Sir Omar Faiek Shennib and brother to Lady Amal Shennib and Lady Ibtisam Shennib was a commander in the pre-1969 Libyan army.

Sir Abdul Aziz was a graduate of the Royal Military Academy Sandhurst entering as a cadet in 1955. Upon his return to Libya, he entered the Royal Army in which he served for fifteen years until the Coup of 1969. As Commander of the Royal Army he was arrested in the first days after Qaddafi seizing power and imprisoned for four and a half years.

== Foiled Assassination of King Hussein of Jordan and Political Asylum ==
Upon the release of Sir Abdul Aziz Shennib in 1974 he was appointed by Gaddafi as ambassador to Jordan. The surprising appointment was "no gesture of reconciliation with the old regime". As Sir Abdul-Aziz had been at the Royal Military Academy Sandhurst with King Hussein of Jordan, he was strategically appointed by Gaddafi with express orders to assassinate his former classmate and close friend shortly after his arrival in Jordan. Sir Abdul Aziz accepted the appointment.

However, upon Sir Shennib's arrival in Amman, he immediately informed King Hussein of Jordan of the plot against his life, defected from the Libyan regime, announcing his refusal to carry out the assassination. Sir Abdul Aziz Shennib and his immediate family were thereafter placed under the protection of the Jordanian monarchy as recompense for his loyalty and friendship.

Under the protection of King Hussein, Sir Abdul Aziz joined the National Front for the Salvation of Libya, an expatriate Libyan opposition to Gaddafi. Later, at a press conference in Cairo, Sir Abdul Aziz Shennib revealed that Gaddafi had ordered the murder of Lebanese cleric Musa al-Sadr, whose disappearance in August 1978 had, until his revelation, been the subject of speculation.
