= Ibn al-Ajdabi =

Libyan scholar and linguist

Ibn al-Ajdābī
- أبو إسحاق إبراهيم بن إسماعيل بن أحمد بن عبد الله اللواتي الأجدابي الطرابلسي
- Born: Abū Ishāq Ibrāhīm ibn Ismā'īl ibn Ahmad ibn Abdallāh al-Lawātī al-Ajdābī al-Tarāblisī
- Died: after c. 1077 AD (456 AH); Tripoli, Libya
- Occupations: Scholar, Linguist

Academic work
- Era: Islamic Golden Age
- Discipline: Islamic jurisprudence; kalam; Arabic language; Astronomy
- Notable works: The Learner's Adequacy and the Speaker's Aspiration كفاية المتحفظ وغاية المتلفظ; The Greater Prosody العروض الكبير; The Lesser Prosody العروض الصغير; Explanation of That Which Ends With Geminated Ya' شرح ما آخره ياء مشددة من الأسماء; A Summary of the Science of Genealogy مختصر في علم الأنساب; A Brief Genealogy of Quraish مختصر نسب قريش; Times and the Climate الأزمنة والأنواء; Reply to Abu Hafs Ibn Makki on Training of the Tongue الرد على أبي حفص بن مكي في تثقيف اللسان

Ibn al-Ajdābī (Arabic: أبو إسحاق إبراهيم بن إسماعيل بن أحمد بن عبد الله اللواتي الأجدابي الطرابلسي, Abū Ishāq Ibrāhīm ibn Ismā'īl ibn Ahmad ibn Abdallāh al-Lawātī al-Ajdābī al-Tarāblisī) died after c. 1077 AD (456 AH) was a prominent Libyan scholar and linguist. His fields of expertise covered Islamic jurisprudence, kalam, Arabic language and astronomy. He lived all his life in Tripoli and died and was buried there. He studied under Libyan scholars of his time and was famous for being interested in meeting those who traveled through Tripoli from the Mashriq and the Maghrib and acquiring wider knowledge from them. It is said that when he was asked about how he acquired all this knowledge, he replied, "I acquired it from the Huwwāra and Znāta gates," which refers to the names of two main gates to Tripoli, named after two Berber tribes.

== Bibliography ==
- كفاية المتحفظ وغاية المتلفظ (The Learner's Adequacy and the Speaker's Aspiration)
- العروض الكبير (The Greater Prosody)
- العروض الصغير (The Lesser Prosody)
- شرح ما آخره ياء مشددة من الأسماء (Explanation of That Which Ends With Geminated Ya')
- مختصر في علم الأنساب (A Summary of the Science of Genealogy)
- مختصر نسب قريش (A Brief Genealogy of Quraish)
- الأزمنة والأنواء (Times and the Climate)
- الرد على أبي حفص بن مكي في تثقيف اللسان (Reply to Abu Hafs Ibn Makki on Training of the Tongue)
