= Halla Diyab =

British screenwriter

Dr. Halla Diyab is a British Libyan-born award-winning screenwriter, author, producer, broadcaster and TV commentator on British media and has recently appeared on Channel 4 News, BBC Newsnight, CNN, Sky News, Channel 5 News, ITV Central, Al-Jazeera English, STV Scotland Tonight and BBC Radio 4. She is also an author and analyst at The Jamestown Foundation monthly subscription-based "Militant Leadership Monitor". Diyab is a columnist at al-Arabiya English News, writing on Syria, ISIS and Middle East political affairs. She has also written several successful Arab soap operas and produced several documentaries which have been aired across the Middle East, Europe and the UK, and have featured in international film festivals. She worked as a TV presenter on Rotana Cinema TV Channel co-hosting the Egyptian talk show Lady of Ladies as well as holding a regular guest spot on Egypt's Hala Sarhan Show.

Recently she hosted a weekly talk show from London on ANB TV in London. She also hosted Syria on the Table TV talk show series. Diyab was listed in Aliqtisadi Magazine as one of the most influential women in Syria for 2011. She was profiled in the "Women Like Us" exhibition that celebrated inspirational Muslim women. She is also the Founder and the Director of Liberty Media Productions which focuses on cross-cultural issues between Britain and the Middle East.

Diyab is a public speaker who spoke at the House of Commons, the Spectator Debate, Leicester National Interfaith Week, Uniting for Peace and London's Frontline Club. As well as working in the British media, she has worked in Libya, Egypt, Saudi Arabia, and Syria and is an expert on the Middle East and Islamic culture.

== Education ==
Diyab graduated with a PhD in Drama on Crossing the margin: minorities and marginality in the drama of Tennessee Williams from the University of Leicester, BA and MA in Gender and Women Studies from the University of Warwick, she has an outstanding academic record with an Award for Best Presentation in the Area of Business, Social Science and Arts at the University of Leicester Postgraduate Festival in June 2006. Diyab is also a published author as her latest book "Crossing the Margin" was published by LAP Lambert Academic Publishing in October 2012.

== Campaign against extremism ==
In 2005 Diyab was commissioned to write her first television series, Beautiful Maidens. The title was derived from the 72 beautiful virgins who are said to meet martyrs in heaven. The series was about the victims and perpetrators of a suicide bombing in Saudi Arabia. It aired during Ramadan and generated high viewing figures and mass media interest. She also wrote a 30-episode television drama; Ma Malakat Aymanukum, or Your Rightful Disposal, which was also broadcast during Ramadan. The title is from a passage in the Koran which talks of the enslavement of women. This series breaks of taboos on a range of contentious topics such as homosexuality, virginity, extremism, sexual and physical abuse, the burqa and the French ban on face covering. The show follows a woman who moves to France from the Middle East and what her life is like without the burka.

Ma Malakat Aymanukum also received high viewing figures.

== Criticism ==
After Beautiful Maidens aired, Diyab became a target for clerics and scholars who accused her of insulting Islam. Before the release of Ma Malakat Aymanukum unsuccessful attempts were made to persuade the Syrian government to ban her work.

Diyab has been accused of atheism and her private life was investigated by religious leaders. Sheikh Said Ramadan al-Bouti claimed that God was withholding rain as a punishment to the nation for her work.

She received further opposition during an interview on London-based Arabic TV channel Alhiwar in October 2010.

In response, she stated, "I feel marginalized and I am always under fire in the Middle East media because of my liberal views and because I strive to break the boundaries. Religious scholars want to silence the voice of women and they play the role of politicians in the Middle East."

== Controversy over the Burka ==
She has been outspoken about the burka. In addition to writing Ma Malakat Aymanukum, she has expressed personal views on the clothing item.

She believes Arabic women are being oppressed by men claiming to be motivated by religion. She sees the burka as a barrier to women achieving the equality they deserve.

== Meetings with Gaddafi ==
Diyab was approached twice by former Libyan leader Muammar Gaddafi over media projects. In 2007 they discussed a film he wanted made about the Italian colonisation of Libya. The film was to be called "Dhulm: Years of Torment".

She described Gaddafi as "ruthless and intimidating". After agreeing to write the film and completing the script, the film was dropped due to a change in the diplomatic situation with Italy.

In 2010 she was asked to produce a documentary on the late leader's life, however she declined the project claiming that it would "affect [her] credibility".

== Recognition ==
In June 2006, Diyab was awarded Best Presentation Award in the area of Business, Social Science and Arts at the University of Leicester Postgraduate Festival which is an annual academic research festival celebrates the research work of the university's Ph.D. students. Diyab's presentation titled "Reading the Minorities in Tennessee Williams’ The Night of the Iguana: Between Fiction, Drama and the Hollywood Screen". She was finalist the Regional Research Competition, Midlands Hub, held at the University of Warwick. In April 2007 she was awarded by the University of Leicester, William Ruddick Scholarship to conduct a research at Tennessee Williams Research Centre at The Historic New Orleans Collection, USA. In December 2010, Diyab was awarded Best Drama Script Award from the Ministry of Media in Syria

She was also nominated for the Best Script Adonia Award in 2010. In January 2011, Diyab was awarded Artist's Achievement Award, presented by Mahmoud Abbas for Ma Malakat Aymanukum. Her work was praised for its contribution to tackling terrorism and Muslim extremism in the Middle East.

== Television credentials ==
- Scriptwriter of "Ma Malakat Aymankum", Future TV, MBC, Syrian TV (2010-2011), drama
- Scriptwriter of "Hur Alain – Heaven Maiden", MBC, 2005, drama
- Scriptwriter of "Killing the Jasmine"( LBC, 2007) three-part TV series Hur Alain featured in the 17th Festival Cinema Africano, Asia and Latin America in March 2007
- Scriptwriter of "The Fragile" (LBC, 2008), three-part TV series
- Scriptwriter and Producer of "Sawa Ya Shabab", (Syrian TV, 2008), drama
- Scriptwriter and Producer of "Wadi Hanifa: Journey of Change" (Saudi satellite channel,2010), documentary
- Scriptwriter, Film Director and Producer of "New Maps to Old Treasure" (Al Jazeera TV, 2010), documentary
- Scriptwriter, Film Director and Producer of "Hyatt Medical Centre" (Fundraising event, November 2010), documentary. The film was shortlisted at Al Jazeera Film Festival 2011 in short films’ category
- Scriptwriter, Film Director and Producer of "Investing in Youth" (Fundraising event, 2011), documentary
- Scriptwriter of "Chiffon" (Mujan TV, 2011), drama

== Fitnah ==
As of 2012 Dr Diyab was working on Fitnah, a 30- part reality TV series about a group of young British and Middle Eastern Muslims who confront, challenge and hopefully deter their descent into radical fundamentalism and religious extremism.

Fitnah's mission is to inspire Muslim youths through a series of confrontations with extreme views of Islam, to help them reach a balanced view of Islam.

The show brings together some of Britain's and the Middle East's most extreme youths to see if they can be changed and persuaded by 8 mentors.

The series will attempt to uncover whether their attitudes are due to personal and family circumstance, society or religious politics and Islam itself. It also examines how mentors use their real-life expertise to impact their charges.

== Media coverage ==
Halla has regularly appeared as a Middle East expert, speaking in both the British and foreign media.

Diyab contributed to a variety of other publications, including the New York Times, Magharebia.com, Al Qabas, Ahram.org, Middle East Online, Al Quds, Elaph, Maan News, Alarabalyawm and Pukaar News. Pukaar Magazine
