= Abd As-Salam Al-Asmar =

Islamic scholar from Libya in the tenth century AH

- Born: January 1, 1455
- Died: January 1, 1575 (aged 120)
- Citizenship: Libya
- Occupations: Islamicist; Writer

Sidi Abd As-Salam Al-Asmar (Arabic: عبد السلام الأسمر, Al-Lasmar `Abd as-Salām) was a renowned religious Libyan Muslim saint who lived and died during the 15th century (1455–1575 CE). He is called al-Asmar because he stayed up most of the night in prayer.

== Life ==
Sidi Abd As-Salam Al-Asmar was born as Salim Al-Fayturi in 1455 (ca. 859 AH) in the small city of Zliten, Libya, which is located roughly 100 mi (161 km) east of Tripoli near Leptis Magna. He belonged to the Fawatir tribe, while the nickname al-Asmar was given to him by his mother, who is believed to have been ordered to do so in a dream. He received his early mystical training from Abd al-Wahid al-Dukali, a khalifa of the Shadhili 'Arusi order who initiated him into the tariqa.

Al-Asmar lived as a zahid (ascetic), alone in Libya's vast desert performing various types of miracles for those in need. Later in life he became a mujahid (holy warrior), taking up arms in defense of his city. He died in 1575 aged 120 and his tomb became a place of pilgrimage, a large masjid was constructed in his remembrance at the location surrounding his grave. Not far from the masjid is one of the most respected and renowned Quranic educational institutions (madrasah) in Libya, named Al-Jamiaa Al-Asmariya (الجامعة الأسمرية i.e. Al-Asmariya Islamic University). A small archaeological museum contains various frescoes from the villa of Dar Buc Ammera and a collection of ceramic Roman artifacts belonging to the various tombs found on the peripheries.

On the anniversary of the destruction of tombs of the Al-Baqi' graveyard, the mosque and grave of Al-Asmar was reportedly destroyed on August 24, 2012, by Salafis and Wahhabis on the pretext that Islam does not allow worshipping graves and the dead.

== See also ==
- Islam in Libya
- List of Libyans
- Zliten
