= Party of Reform and Development =

Political party in Libya

Party of Reform and Development حزب الاصلاح والتنمية
- Founder: Khaled al-Werchefani
- Founded: 10 January 2012; 14 years ago
- Ideology: Islamism; Salafism
- Political position: Right-wing
- Religion: Sunni Islam

The Party of Reform and Development (PRD; Arabic: حزب الاصلاح والتنمية, Hizb Al-Islah Wal-Tanmiyah) is a political party in Libya, that was founded on 10 January 2012 in Benghazi. It is an Islamist party, promoting the principles of Sharia law. It is led by Khaled al-Werchefani, a former member of the Muslim Brotherhood.
