= Zuhra Ramdan Agha Al-Awji =

Zuhra Ramdan Agha Al-Awji (Arabic: زهرة رمضان آغا العوجي, Zuhra Ramaḍān Āghā al-`Awjī) or "Al-Khowja" originated from Turkey and was of the Turkish people. She was married to Libyan Muslim resistance leader Omar Shegewi and had three children: Mohammed Shegewi, Hassan Shegewi and Idris Shegewi. Not much is known about her life before the execution of her husband in 1928, but it is known that she later moved from Hun to Tripoli and went on to establish the first private Libyan school in Tripoli "Madrasat Al-Areefa Al-Zuhra" (Arabic: مدرسة العريفة الزهره).

This school started as a simple primary classroom for teaching Libyan females reading, writing and Qur'an. Later, it grew in size and expanded to include boys and was in direct competition with the other local primary schools that were established by the Italian colonial forces. Zuhra is known by many to be the first native educator in Libya and most certainly the first female educator in Libya.
