= Arndís Halla =

Icelandic operatic soprano

- Born: 9 December 1969 (age 56); Iceland
- Genre: operatic soprano
- Occupations: Singer

Arndís Halla Ásgeirsdóttir (born 9 December 1969) is an Icelandic soprano opera singer who became known as "The Voice of Apassionata" as the main singer in the Apassionata show in 2003. After studying and performing in Germany, she returned to Iceland in 2012 where she now entertains tourists.

== Biography ==
Born on 9 December 1969, Arndís Halla Ásgeirsdóttir was brought up in Reykjavík where she attended the Söngskólinn (Reykjavík Academy of Singing and Vocal Arts). She completed her studies in Germany where she graduated from the Berlin University of the Arts in 2000. While studying, she was invited by Harry Kupfer to join the Komische Oper Berlin.

Her international reputation was triggered by her performance as the Queen of the Night in Mozart's The Magic Flute at several locations, including the Icelandic Opera in 2001. Her success was enhanced by appearances in Prague, Monte Carlo and in South Korea. In 2007, she performed at the opening of the Venice Film Festival. Back in Iceland, she appeared in Ariadne auf Naxos and took the lead role in Evita.

In 2003, she joined Apassionata, a family entertainment show with horses, performing as the main singer until 2011. As a result, she published several albums, including Óður (2007), Edda (2008), Keep on Walking (2012) and Ístónar (2014).

In 2012, she returned to Iceland where she acts as a tour guide and entertainer for the German-speaking passengers on the cruise ship Ocean Diamond as it sails around the island. She is particularly fond of Icelandic music and welcomes the chance to return to her own apartment in the evening after working on the ship during the day.
