= Joseph Halla =

Czech-Austrian medical doctor (1814–1887)

Portrait of Halla from 1879

Joseph Halla or Josef Halla (2 June 1814 – 12 January 1887) was a Czech-Austrian medical doctor.

== Life ==
Halla was born on 2 June 1814 in Prague in Bohemia, Austrian Empire. In July 1837, he received his medical doctorate from the University of Prague. He furthered his education in Vienna under Carl von Rokitansky and Joseph Škoda, and subsequently travelled throughout Western Europe. He returned to Bohemia in 1838 and began working as an assistant medical doctor at the psychiatric hospital in Prague. In 1839–1843, he worked at the Internal Medicine Department of the General Hospital in Prague.

From 1850 to 1854, Halla was an associate professor and director of the Prague medical clinic. Afterwards he served as a "full professor" and chief medical doctor at the General Hospital in Prague. In 1867, he was rector of the University of Prague.

At Prague, he was an editor of the journal Vierteljahrschrift Für Die Praktische Heilkunde. In 1865, he became an honorary member of the Société médicale allemande de Paris.

Halla died in Prague on 12 January 1887.

== Written works ==
- Einiges über Classification (1846).
- Über Aethereinathmungen (1847) – on inhalation of ether
- Entwurf einer Universitätsreform (1849) – draft on university reform
- Beobb. über Aneurysmen der Brustaorta (1864) – on aneurysms of the thoracic aorta
