= Ahmed Fouad Shennib =

Libyan poet, politician and ambassador

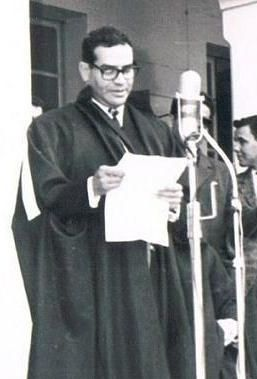
- Shennib in 1964

Education minister of Libya
- In office 19 March 1963 – 22 January 1964
- Preceded by: Abul Qassim al-Allaghi
- Succeeded by: Mohammed al-Mayyet

Personal details
- Born: 1923 Hama, Syria
- Died: January 7, 2007 (aged 83–84) Benghazi, Libya
- Children: Hani Shennib

Ahmed Fouad Shennib (Arabic: أحمد فؤاد شنيب) was a Libyan poet, politician and ambassador.

Born in Hama, Syria, in 1923 of Libyan parents in exile. Shennib was educated at the Sorbonne in Paris and served as cultural attaché to UNESCO until 1959. He then served as cultural attaché in Washington, DC (1959–1963), then Paris, France, in 1963. He then returned to Libya in 1963 to serve as Minister of Education and Culture until 1964.

Ahmed Fouad Shennib died in January 2007 of pancreatic cancer in Benghazi, Libya.

== Literary Contributions ==
Ahmed Fouad Shennib is most known for his collection of poems addressing the subject of Libyan nationalism and identity. His poetry stems primarily from the period following the proclamation of Libyan independence in 1951. During this period several poets emerged "who rejected the classical forms of Arabic versification and showed an interest in social problems, particularly the life of the common people". The primary authors of this period were Ahmed Fuad Shennib, Ali Sidqi Abd al-Kadir and Ali al-Ruqii. Common themes of prose during this period were the struggle for independence, social equality and condemned prejudice.

The poems 'Libya', 'After Dusk' and 'Al Ashiqah' regularly feature in the curricula of Arabic Literature covering North Africa.
