= Salem Abdul Salem Ghereby =

Libyan detainee in Guantanamo (1961–2023)

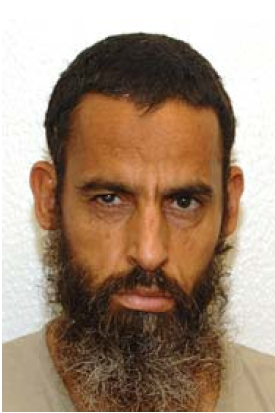
- His official Guantanamo identity portrait, showing him wearing a white uniform, indicating he was classified as “compliant” captive.
- Born: March 1, 1961; Zliten, Libya
- Released: 4 April 2016; Senegal
- Died: April 12, 2023 (aged 62); Libya
- Detained at: Guantanamo
- Other names: Radfat Muhammad Faqi Alji Saqqaf; Salim Gherebi; Falen Gherebi; Salim Abd al-Salam Umran al-Ghuraybi; Luqman al-Libi; Luqman al-Zalaytani; Hakim Luqman, Abu Abd al-Rouf
- ISN: 189
- Charge(s): no charge, held in extrajudicial detention
- Status: released to Senegal

Salem Abdul Salem Ghereby (1 March 1961 – 12 April 2023) was a citizen of Libya who was held in extrajudicial detention in the United States' Guantanamo Bay detention camps, in Cuba, from 5 May 2002, until 4 April 2016. Joint Task Force Guantanamo counter-terrorism analysts reports that he was born on 1 March 1961, in Zliten, Libya.

== Personal life ==
According to historian Andy Worthington, the author of The Guantanamo Files, Gherebi had settled in Pakistan after fleeing Muammar Gaddafi's repressive regime in Libya. He was married to a Pakistani woman, and had fathered several children. He had worked as a teacher, teaching science at a primary school.

== Official status reviews ==
Originally the Bush Presidency asserted that captives apprehended in the "war on terror" were not covered by the Geneva Conventions, and could be held indefinitely, without charge, and without an open and transparent review of the justifications for their detention. In 2004, the United States Supreme Court ruled, in Rasul v. Bush, that Guantanamo captives were entitled to being informed of the allegations justifying their detention, and were entitled to try to refute them.

=== Habeas corpus ===
Salem was the first Guantanamo captive to challenge whether he should have access to US Civil Courts. Human rights lawyer Stephen Yagman filed the appeal on Salem's behalf after being contacted by Salem's brother.

Justice Matz ruled against Salem but Matz's ruling was overturned on appeal by the 9th US Circuit Court of Appeals, on 18 December 2003.

On 20 February 2007, two of the three judges on the US Court of Appeals for the DC Circuit ruled that the Military Commissions Act stripped the right to use habeas corpus from the Guantanamo captives retroactively and appeals, including Salem's, which were in process, were vacated.

=== Office for the Administrative Review of Detained Enemy Combatants ===
Combatant Status Review Tribunals were held in a 3x5 meter trailer where the captive sat with his hands and feet shackled to a bolt in the floor.

Following the Supreme Court's ruling the Department of Defense set up the Office for the Administrative Review of Detained Enemy Combatants.

Scholars at the Brookings Institution, led by Benjamin Wittes, listed the captives still held in Guantanamo in December 2008, according to whether their detention was justified by certain common allegations:

- Salem Abdul Salem Ghereby was listed as one of the captives who "The military alleges ... are members of Al Qaeda."
- Salem Abdul Salem Ghereby was listed as one of the captives whose "names or aliases were found on material seized in raids on Al Qaeda safehouses and facilities."
- Salem Abdul Salem Ghereby was listed as one of the captives who was an "al Qaeda operative".
- Salem Abdul Salem Ghereby was listed as one of the "82 detainees made no statement to CSRT or ARB tribunals or made statements that do not bear materially on the military's allegations against them."

=== Formerly secret Joint Task Force Guantanamo assessment ===
On 25 April 2011, whistleblower organization WikiLeaks published formerly secret assessments drafted by Joint Task Force Guantanamo analysts. His Joint Task Force Guantanamo assessment was 12 pages long, and was drafted on February 20, 2008. It was signed by camp commandant Rear Admiral Mark H. Buzby. He recommended continued detention.

== Salem's legal representation ==
Salem's lawyer was Duke University professor Erwin Chemerinsky. He handled Salem's writ of habeas corpus. In 2002, Chemerinsky said he received death threats for his efforts on Gherebi's behalf:

- "I've never done anything that's gotten the quantity of hate mail this has gotten."
- "I just feel it's so important for the United States to follow the law."

== Transfer to Senegal ==
On 4 April 2016, Abu Bakr, and another Libyan Salem Abdul Salem Ghereby, were transferred to Senegal. Citing his formerly secret Joint Task Force Assessment, published by the whistleblower organization WikiLeaks in April 2011, Fox News described Ghereby as someone who "has been involved in extremist activities since at least the mid-1990s."

== Death ==
On 12 April 2023, Ghereby died in Libya after suffering from motor neurone disease.
