= Jebel Akhdar campaign =

1923–1931 Second Italo-Senussi War fighting in Libya

- Part of the Second Italo-Senussi War
Date	1923 – 1931 (accurate date is unknown)
Location	Jebel Akhdar, Cyrenaica, Libya
Result	Italian victory: Many victims among Senussi civilians and soldiers
Territorial changes	The Italians occupy Cyrenaica, including the Jebel Akhdar area

Belligerents
Italy	Senussi Order

Commanders and leaders
(Kingdom of Italy) Pietro Badoglio; (Kingdom of Italy) Rodolfo Graziani	Omar al-Mukhtar (executed); Yusuf Burahil †; Omar Shegewi (executed)

Casualties and losses
- More than 100,000 Bedouins deported ▼ ~50% of the Cyrenaican population

The Campaign in Jebel Akhdar refers to the fighting between Italian soldiers and Senussi rebels near the forested and mountainous areas of the Jebel Akhdar. The attacks by the Italians were initially met by strong guerrilla resistance, but this resistance soon fell as the Battle of Uadi Bu Taga took place. This conflict resulted in the execution of the main Senussi leaders and, subsequently, the end of the Italian pacification campaign.

== Course of the War ==
In 1923, the fascist government of Benito Mussolini ordered generals Rodolfo Graziani and Pietro Badoglio to occupy the Jebel Akhdar area, building fortifications guarded by Savaris. However, these positions where threatened by the Lion of the Desert and his army, who used guerrilla tactics to fight back the Colonials. During this campaign, 100,000 Bedouins, half of the population of the entire region of Cyrenaica, were deported to various barbed-wire concentration camps, most of them in Benghazi. Due to this, Italian Generals and Omar Mukhtar tried to negotiate the course of the war, but none of the sides agreed and because of that, Italy began to plan the full conquest of Libya. In a carefully prepared and coordinated operation with ten differently composed columns, Graziani tried from 16 June 1930, to encircle and destroy the units of Omar Mukhtar. However, the Senussi combat units were prepared for battle as they were again informed by the local population and by deserters from Italian colonial troops and, by dividing themselves into smaller groups of units, they managed to escape the encirclement by the Italian columns but with very heavy losses. On 9 September 1931, Graziani started another offensive this time towards Slonta and Cyrene and this one was a success: the leader of the rebellion, Omar al-Mukhtar, was wounded and then captured in battle, ending definitely the War in Jebel Akhdar.
