= Sirtica campaign (1924) =

Part of the Second Italo-Senussi War in modern-day Libya

- Part of the Second Italo-Senussi War
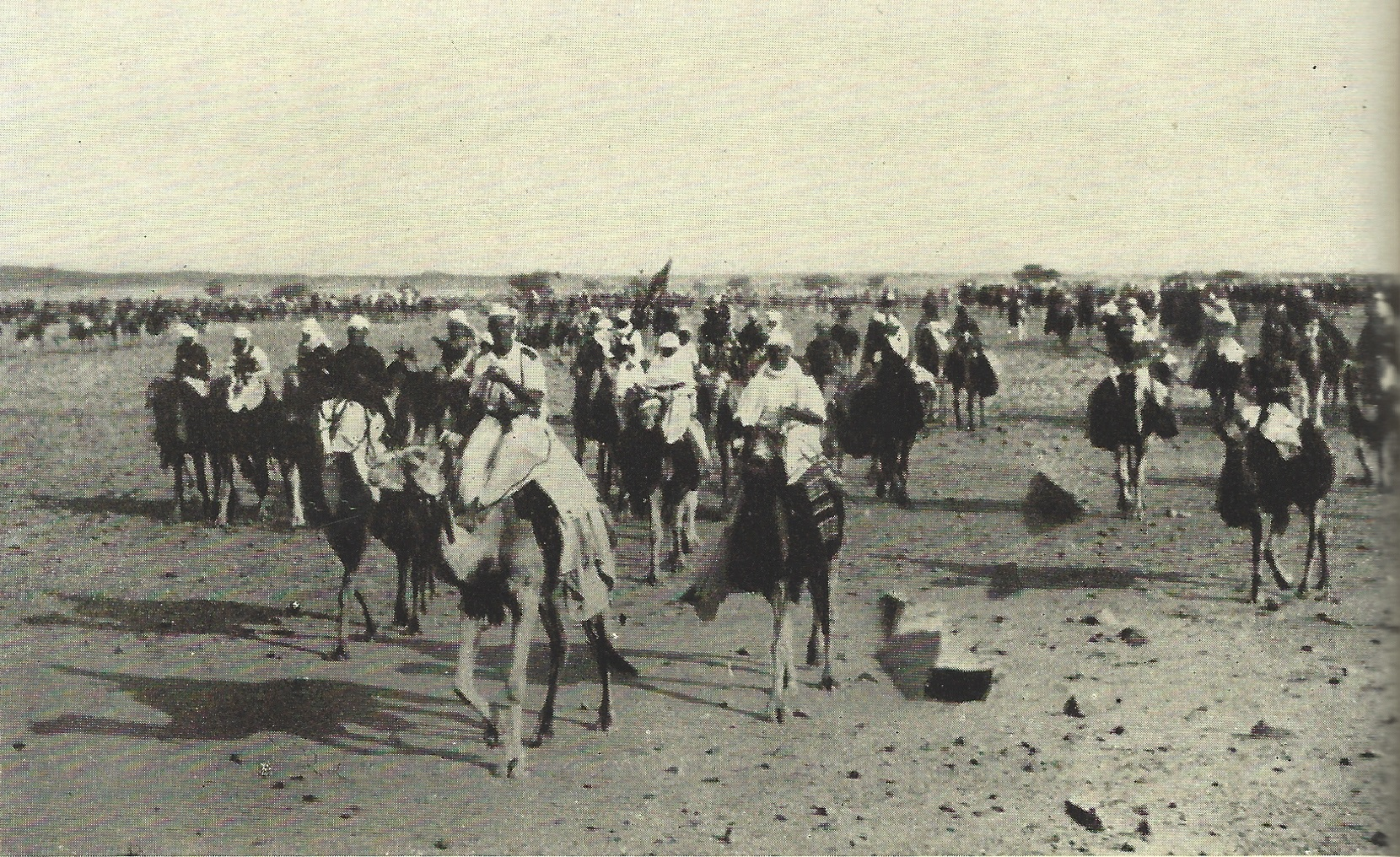
- Meharists led by Amedeo D'Aosta during the campaign
Date	November 1924 – March 1925
Location	Sirte and surroundings, Tripolitania
Result	Italian victory
Territorial changes	The Italians occupy 150,000 sq km of territory (58,000 sq mi)

Belligerents
Italy	Senussi Order

Commanders and leaders
(Kingdom of Italy) Colonel Mezetti	Omar al-Mukhtar

Strength
3 battalions & squadrons, 1 battery and more Number of troops unknown, but it is stated that 1/3 of troops that took part in the offensive were colonial troops	Unknown

The Sirtica campaign, or Sirte campaign, was a military campaign executed by the Regio Esercito that took place between November 1924 and March 1925. It was one of the first actions during the Second Italo-Senussi War.

== Background ==
At the outbreak of World War I, Italy found itself in difficulty in maintaining control over its territory in Fezzan where, moreover, was the activity of the Senussi rebels who were supported by Turkish garrisons led by commander Enver Bey, who remained in Libya even after the signing of the peace treaty. In December 1914, therefore, all the Italian military garrisons in Fezzan were abandoned, including the one of Brak, where the forces had been concentrated before the retreat. Since then, Italian dominion remained precarious and limited to a narrow coastal strip. During the conflict, Italy withdrew part of its troops and dismantled the garrisons in the interior of the two regions, also because of the defeats at Gasr Bu Hadi and Sidi Abu Arqub, while it maintained its coastal garrisons in Tripolitania and Cyrenaica to counter Senussi offensives who were supported by Ottoman and German supplies. After the campaign, which ended in a Central Powers defeat, a new conflict rose up, which would totally confirm Italian rule in Libya.

== Course of the Campaign ==
Colonel Mezetti was given responsibility for dispersing the Senussi forces in Sirte. To regain possession of northern Tripolitania, all that was needed was the reoccupation of Sirtica, in which leaders and armed men from the newly conquered territories had taken refuge. The Governor deemed it appropriate this time to precede a brief political preparation, through which numerous people from Misuratino and Orfella were able to return to their countries. Then, decided to act energetically. Colonel Mezzetti who, concentrating his forces including 3 battalions, 3 squadrons, 1 battery, and other elements near Misrata, advanced along the western coast of Great Sirte and, after defeated some light enemy resistance at Gasr Bu Hadi (south of Sirte itself), entered Sirte on 23 November 1924. With these actions, after 35 months of prudent political and military action, the cycle that brought all of northern Tripolitania back under direct Italian rule was closed. Since then, the activity of the Government of Tripolitania was dedicated to the preparation of the troops and especially to the establishment of special Saharan units, as well as to the political-military organization of the territory with the establishment of "civil police stations" in the Gebel area and with the creation of the «Command of the territories of the southern Tripoli area».

== Sources ==
- Wright, John (1983). Libya: A Modern History. Kent, England: Croom Helm.
