= Battle of Uadi Bu Taga =

1931–32 Italian victory in Libya

- Part of the Jebel Akhdar campaign during the Second Italo-Senussi War
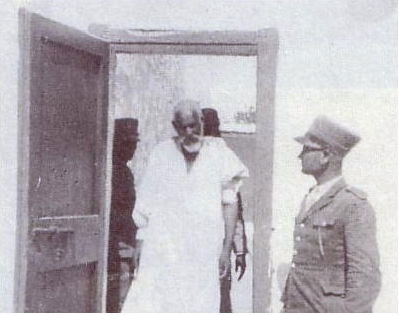
- Omar Mukhtar entering the court room.
Date	September 9, 1931 – September 11, 1932
Location	Uadi Bu Taga, near Slonta and Cyrene, Libya
Result	Italian victory

Belligerents
Italy	Senusiyya

Commanders and leaders
Rodolfo Graziani	Omar al-Mukhtar (POW); Yousuf Burahil (POW); Fadil Bu Umar (POW)

The Battle of Uadi Bu Taga was fought in Libya in September 1931 between Italy and Senusiyya. The battle ended in a key Italian victory.

== Battle ==
Thanks to the help of the air force, during the battle the Italian soldiers defeated the tribes of Braasa and Dorsa and a unit of Libyan Savaris of the Italian Army captured Omar al-Mukhtar, leader of the rebellion, on September 9, 1931. He was later brought to Soluch and executed by hanging here on September 16. His aides, including Yousuf Burahil and Fadil Bu Umar, were also executed on 24 September 1932. Rodolfo Graziani stated that during the executions, 20,000 Bedouins were forced to assist the events to show that their aggression towards the Italian colonials was over. At the end of the battle the heaviest clashes during the Second Italo-Senussi War also ended. The campaign was later declared over by General Pietro Badoglio on 24 January 1932.

== Sources ==
- Wright, John (1982). Libya: A Modern History. Kent, England: Croom Helm. ISBN 978-0-709-92733-4. OCLC 839398534.
- Libyan Heritage House. "The Battles of Kufra and Uadi Bu Taga: the Capture of Omar Al Mukhtar". libyanheritagehouse.org.
- Ahmida, Ali Abdullatif (2006). "When the Subaltern Speak: Memory of Genocide in Colonial Libya 1929 to 1933". Italian Studies. 61 (2): 175–190. doi:10.1179/007516306X142924. S2CID 161690236.
- Quirino, Domenico (2003). Lo squadrone bianco (in Italian). Milan, Italy: Edizioni Mondadori Le Scie. ISBN 978-88-04-50691-1.
