= Affile =

- Comune
- Comune di Affile
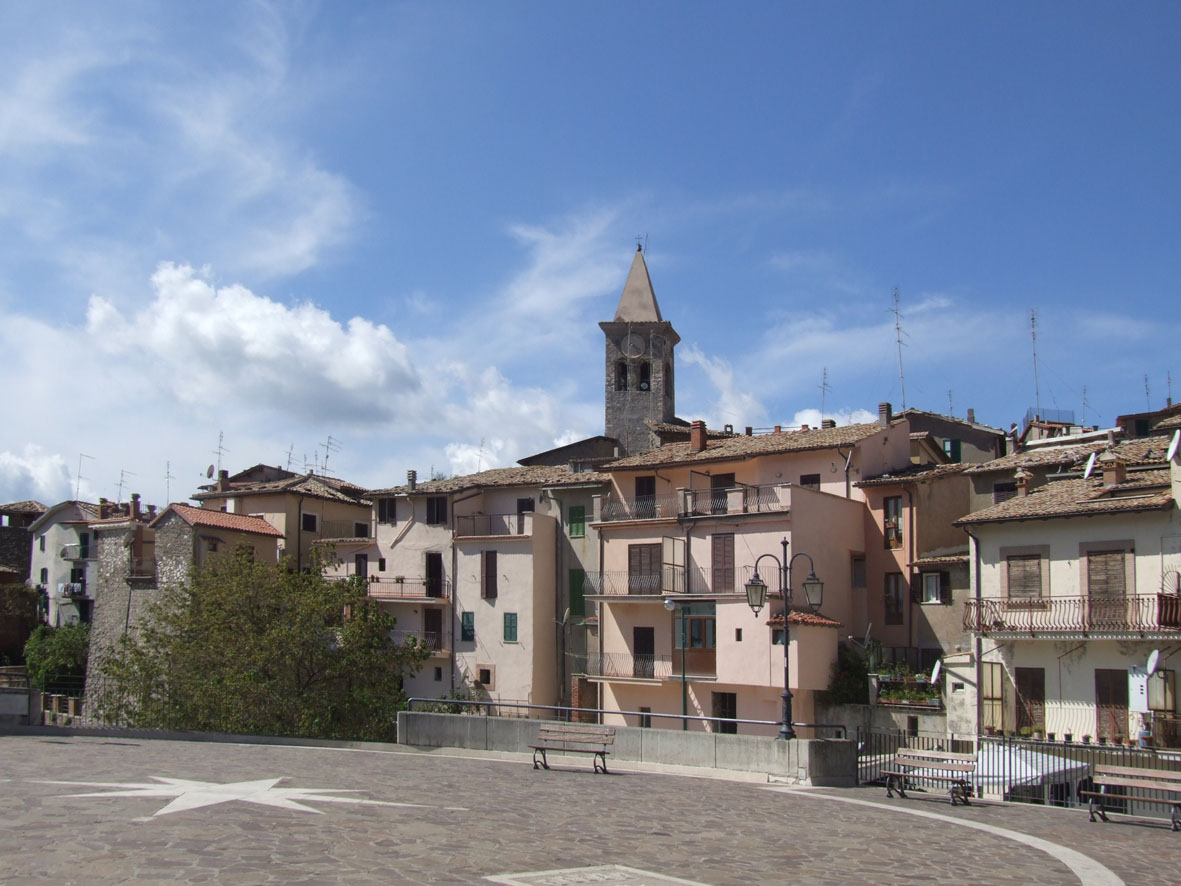
- Affile, Latium, Italy

- Coat of arms

- Location of Affile in Italy Affile (Lazio)
- Coordinates: 41°53′3″N 13°5′49″E
- Country: Italy
- Region: Lazio
- Metropolitan city: Rome (RM)

Government
  - Mayor: Ercole Viri

Area
  - Total: 15.11 km^{2} (5.83 sq mi)
- Elevation: 684 m (2,244 ft)

Population (30 April 2017)
  - Total: 1,506
  - Density: 99.67/km^{2} (258.1/sq mi)
- Demonym: Affilani
- Time zone: UTC+1 (CET)
  - Summer (DST): UTC+2 (CEST)
- Postal code: 00021
- Dialing code: 0774
- Patron saint: Santa Felicita
- Website: Official website

Affile (Latin: Afilae) is a comune (municipality) in the Metropolitan City of Rome in the Italian region of Lazio, located about 50 kilometres (31 mi) east of Rome.

== History ==
Archaeology has shown the existence of a pre-Roman centre here, on the border of the lands of the Hernici and the Aequi. In the 1st century AD it is mentioned as oppidum Afile by Frontinus. It was crossed by the Via Sublacense.

In the 10th century a village existed in the former Roman oppidum, centred on the church of St. Peter. In 1013 a castle (castrum) is cited in Affile, which in 1109 was ceded by Pope Paschal II to the Abbey of St. Scholastica of Subiaco. Later it was a possession of the Altieri and Braschi families.

== Main sights ==
- Roman cistern. In 999 emperor Otto III founded in the site a church, which had however already disappeared in the 16th century.
- Church of St. Peter, known from the early 6th century. The last renovation is from the 15th century.
- Church of St. Mary (known from 1005). It has frescoes from the 13th and 16th-17th centuries.
- Church of Santa Felicita (13th century)
- Castrum, site on a different hill of the originary site of Affile around St. Peter's church. It had once numerous towers, gates and massive walls, of which little traces remain.

== Graziani monument ==
On 11 August 2012 a publicly funded mausoleum and memorial park was unveiled in the town to Rodolfo Graziani, a former resident of the area and convicted war criminal, directly responsible for the deaths of thousands of Ethiopians and Italian partisans, as well as entire populations of villages in, for instance, Monte Rosso. The event was met with widespread criticism in the national and international media. A campaign has since been launched to rededicate the memorial to those who died as a result of Graziani’s actions during Italy’s colonial wars in Ethiopia and Libya as well as during the short-lived Italian Social Republic.

The New York Times described the monument as being in "a style reminiscent of fascist architecture". It was built on Affile's highest hill and bears the inscriptions “Honour” and “Homeland”. Inside is a marble bust of Graziani, a list of his deeds, and original 1955 newspapers from the day he died. The mausoleum was reported to cost Euro 127,000, paid for by taxpayers from regional funds. The town’s mayor, Ercole Viri, donated the bust from his own collection and said he hoped the sight would be as “famous and as popular as Predappio” – the burial place of Mussolini which has become a shrine for neo-Fascists. He later defended the council’s decision by stating that “Graziani was not a war criminal”

However, demonstrations against the memorial were quickly organised. On 12 September the monument was damaged and covered in graffiti. The monument has also been denounced in Ethiopia. Speaking after the 18th International Conference of Ethiopian Studies, historian Bahru Zewde said: "“He [Graziani] is remembered for vowing to deliver Ethiopia to Mussolini “with or without the Ethiopians”. He went on to fulfill that vow with indiscriminate use of chemical weapons and the massacre of thousands of Ethiopians. Graziani was never tried for his war crimes in Africa. Had he been alive, there is no doubt that he would have been forced to face justice at the International Criminal Court. The erection with public funds of a monument for someone who has the blood of so many Africans on his hands is therefore adding insult to injury."

In 2017, Mayor Ercole Viri and two other town councillors were convicted of "fascism apology", a crime in Italy, for building the monument. Viri was sentenced to eight months' imprisonment and the two councillors were sentenced to six months each. The court did not, however, order the removal of the monument which remains in place albeit vandalized and in a state of disrepair.
