= Rodolfo Graziani =

Italian fascist politician and military officer (1882–1955)

Marshal of Italy Rodolfo Graziani
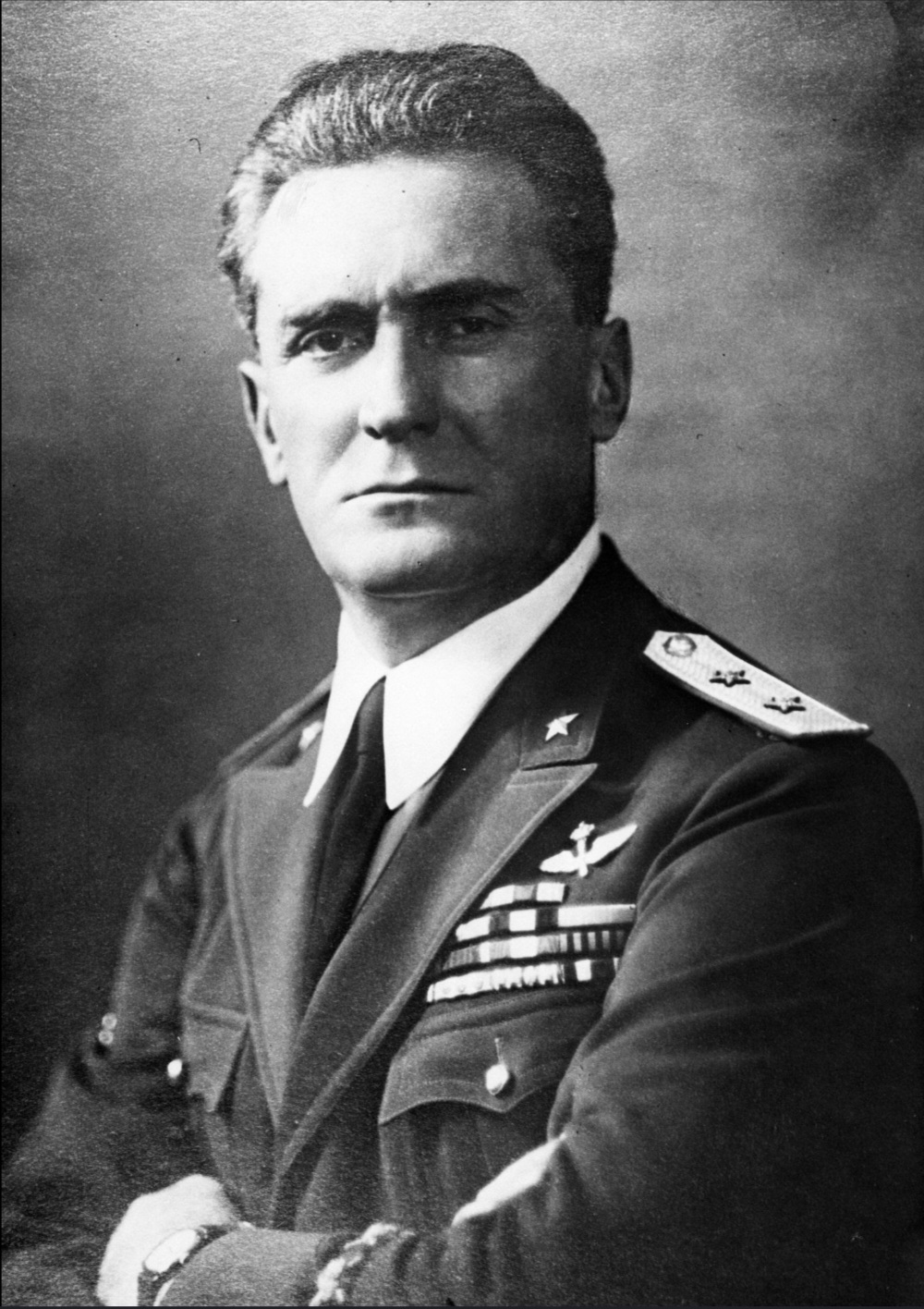

Minister of National Defence of the Italian Social Republic
- In office 23 September 1943 – 25 April 1945
- President: Benito Mussolini
- Preceded by: Office created
- Succeeded by: Office abolished

Chief of Staff of the Royal Italian Army
- In office 3 November 1939 – 24 March 1941
- Preceded by: Alberto Pariani
- Succeeded by: Mario Roatta

Governor-General of Italian Libya
- In office 1 July 1940 – 25 March 1941
- Monarch: Victor Emmanuel III
- Prime Minister: Benito Mussolini
- Preceded by: Italo Balbo
- Succeeded by: Italo Gariboldi

Governor-General of Italian East Africa
- In office 11 June 1936 – 21 December 1937
- Monarch: Victor Emmanuel III
- Prime Minister: Benito Mussolini
- Preceded by: Pietro Badoglio
- Succeeded by: Amedeo, Duke of Aosta

Governor of Italian Somaliland
- In office 6 March 1935 – 9 May 1936
- Preceded by: Maurizio Rava
- Succeeded by: Angelo De Ruben

Vice-Governor of Italian Cyrenaica
- In office 17 March 1930 – 31 May 1934
- Preceded by: Domenico Siciliani
- Succeeded by: Office abolished

Personal details
- Born: 11 August 1882 Filettino, Kingdom of Italy
- Died: 11 January 1955 (aged 72) Rome, Italy
- Resting place: Cemetery of Affile, Italy
- Party: National Fascist Party (1924–1943); Republican Fascist Party (1943–1945); Italian Social Movement (1946–1955)
- Spouse(s): Ines Chionetti (m. 1913–1955); his death
- Children: One daughter
- Education: Military Academy of Modena
- Profession: Military officer

Military service
- Allegiance: Kingdom of Italy (1903–1943); Italian Social Republic (1943–1945)
- Branch/service: Royal Italian Army (1903–1943); National Republican Army (1943–1945)
- Years of service: 1903–1945
- Rank: Marshal of Italy
- Unit: Italian 10th Army; Army Group Liguria
- Battles/wars: World War I; Second Italo-Senussi War; Jebel Akhdar campaign; Battle of Bir Tagrift; Battle of Uadi Bu Taga; Battles for Murzuch; Battle of Kufra (1931); Second Italo-Ethiopian War; Battle of Ganale Doria; Battle of the Ogaden; World War II; North African campaign; Italian invasion of Egypt; Operation Compass; Battle of Sidi Barrani; Action at Mechili; Battle of Beda Fomm; Italian campaign; Gothic Line; Battle of Garfagnana; Spring 1945 offensive in Italy (surrendered)

Rodolfo Graziani, 1st Marquis of Neghelli (US: /ˌɡrɑːtsiˈɑːni/ GRAHT-see-AH-nee, Italian: [roˈdɔlfo ɡratˈtsjaːni]; 11 August 1882 – 11 January 1955) also known as the Butcher of Ethiopia or the Butcher of Fezzan, was an Italian military officer in the Kingdom of Italy's Royal Army, primarily noted for his campaigns in Africa before and during World War II. A dedicated and prominent member of the National Fascist Party, he was a key figure in the Italian military during the regime of Benito Mussolini.

Graziani played an important role in the consolidation and expansion of the Italian colonial empire during the 1920s and 1930s, first in Libya and then in Ethiopia. He became infamous for alleged harsh repressive measures, such as the use of concentration camps that caused many civilian deaths. In February 1937, after an assassination attempt against him during a ceremony in Addis Ababa, Graziani ordered a period of brutal retribution now known as Yekatit 12. Shortly after Italy entered World War II, he returned to Libya as the commander of troops in Italian North Africa but resigned after the 1940–41 British offensive routed his forces, which led to a military catastrophe and a total strategic defeat.

Following the fall of the Fascist regime in Italy in 1943, he was the only Marshal of Italy who remained loyal to Benito Mussolini and was named the Minister of Defence of the Italian Social Republic, commanding its army and returning to active service against the Allies for the rest of the war. Graziani was never prosecuted by the United Nations War Crimes Commission; he was included on its list of Italians eligible to be prosecuted for war crimes, but Allied opposition and indifference to the prosecution of Italian war criminals frustrated Ethiopian attempts to bring him to justice. In 1950, an Italian court sentenced Graziani to 19 years of imprisonment for his collaboration with the Nazis; he was released after serving only four months. In the last years of his life, he went into politics, joining the Italian Social Movement and becoming its Honorary President in 1953. He died a few years later in 1955.

== Early life ==
Rodolfo Graziani was born in Filettino in the province of Frosinone on 11 August 1882. His father, Filippo Graziani, was the village doctor. He was educated in a seminary in the town of Subiaco and then went on to study in the Liceo Torquato Tasso in Rome. Due to economic restraints, Graziani could not apply to the Military Academy of Modena and so decided to study law at university instead, at the urging of his father.

== Military career ==
In 1903, he joined the Royal Italian Army as a reserve officer cadet whilst studying at university. In 1906, he passed a competitive examination for reserve officers to be made regular and became a second lieutenant, stationed at the 1st regiment of Grenadiers in Rome. Graziani's first posting was to Italian Eritrea where he learned Arabic and Tigrinya. In 1911, whilst in the Eritrean countryside, he was bitten by a snake which resulted in him being hospitalized. Because of this, he never served in the Italo-Turkish War. After his convalescence, he was repatriated to Italy where he was promoted to captain. In 1918, during World War I, Graziani in the Regio Esercito became the youngest Colonnello (Colonel) in Italian history.

=== Libya ===
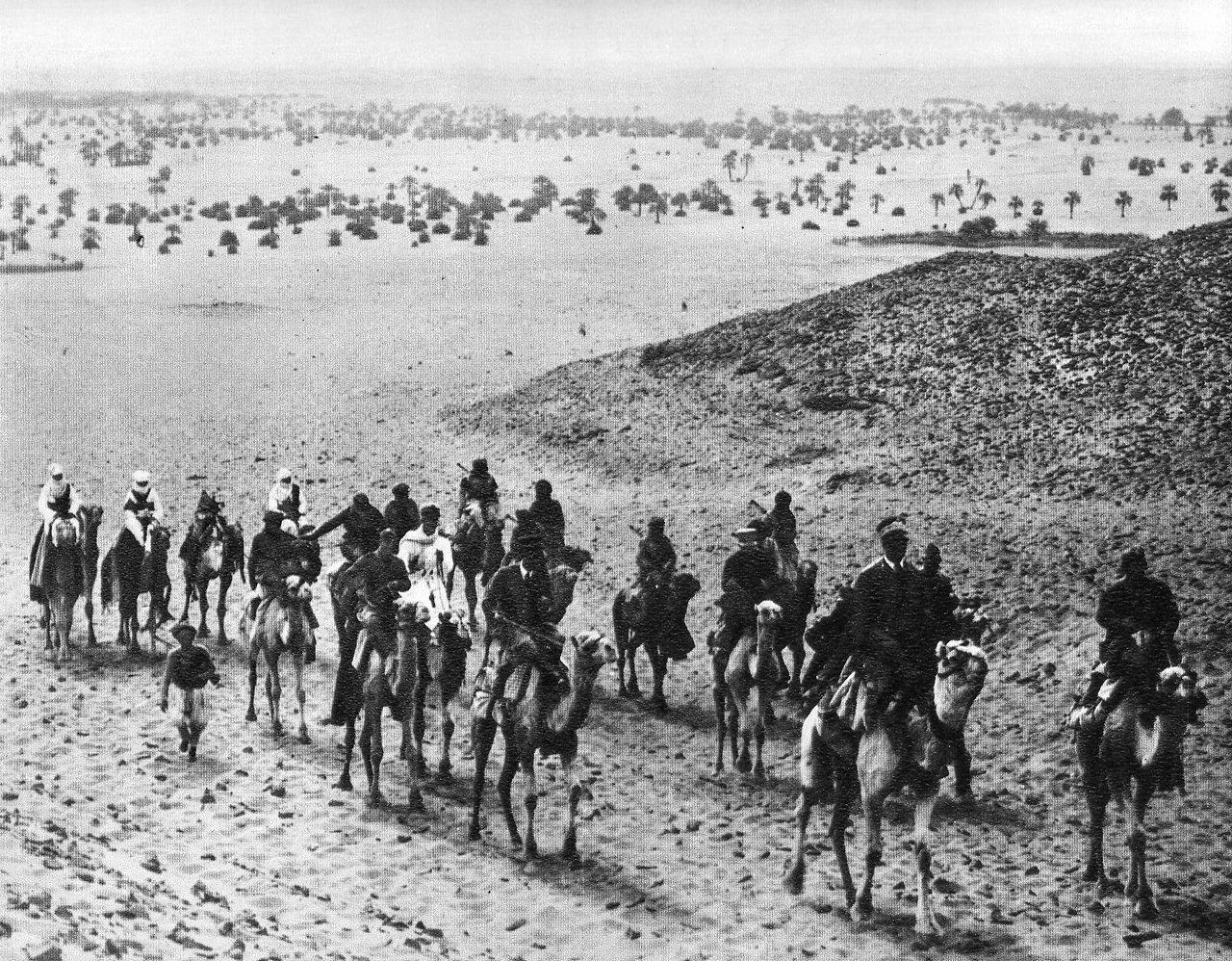
Rodolfo Graziani and Amedeo D'Aosta's troops in Kufra, 1931

After the war Graziani was sent to Libya, participating in the pacification of Tripolitania during the Jebel Akhdar campaign, which earned him an honorary membership card of the National Fascist Party, and of Cyrenaica (1928-1930), following which on 11 January 1930 Graziani was nominated vice-governor of Italian Cyrenaica. Graziani had understood that rapidity in movements and travel was fundamental in order not to give the enemy any respite and in doing this the contribution of the indigenous cavalry integrated into the "mobile columns" was fundamental, as happened with the Italian conquest of Kufra.

In 1931, he was sent to Italian Cyrenaica to repress the twenty-year anti-colonialist revolt led by ʿOmar al-Mukhtar: Graziani moved his headquarters to Zuwarah and managed to regain control, including political control, of almost all of Cyrenaica. Pietro Badoglio, eager to definitively close the issue with the Libyan rebels, ordered Graziani to remove the population of Gebel el-Achdar, where al-Mukhtār found refuge and protection and to transfer them to special concentration camps on the coast.

The decision was taken even before Graziani was appointed vice-governor; it had already been evident that the military option alone was not sufficient to weaken the Libyan resistance, but that the entire population that provided assistance had to be involved in the repression. The populations of the Gebel desert were therefore moved to the appropriate camps built on the coast, the most important of which were Marsa Brega, Soluch, Agedabia, El-Agheila, Sidi Ahmed and El-Abiar. The erection of the numerous camps did not fail to arouse controversy throughout the Arab world. The choice which proved decisive in defeating the rebellion in Cyrenaica, as al-Mukhtār himself later admitted, arose from the need to definitively separate the populations subjugated by the rebels, who had demonstrated a notable vitality.

Most of the semi-nomadic populations of the interior were then forced into concentration camps (see mass deportations of the Gebel). In the camps, there was a very high mortality rate due to the terrible hygienic-sanitary conditions and the scarcity of food and water, which cost the lives of tens of thousands of people. In these concentration camps and labour camps, thousands of Libyan prisoners died. Some prisoners were hanged or shot, but most prisoners died of starvation or disease. His deeds earned him the nickname "the Butcher of Fezzan" among the Arabs. Fascist propaganda, however, called him the Pacifier of Libya (Pacificatore della Libia).

On 11 September 1931 in the Got-Illfù plain, after being spotted by the Italian air force, the Libyan leader al-Mukhtār was taken prisoner after the Battle of Uadi Bu Taga. Al-Mukhtar was then sentenced to death by express will of Badoglio, after a summary trial, on 16 September 1931. In May 1934, Graziani was replaced in Cyrenaica by the new vice-governor Guglielmo Nasi.

=== Ethiopia ===
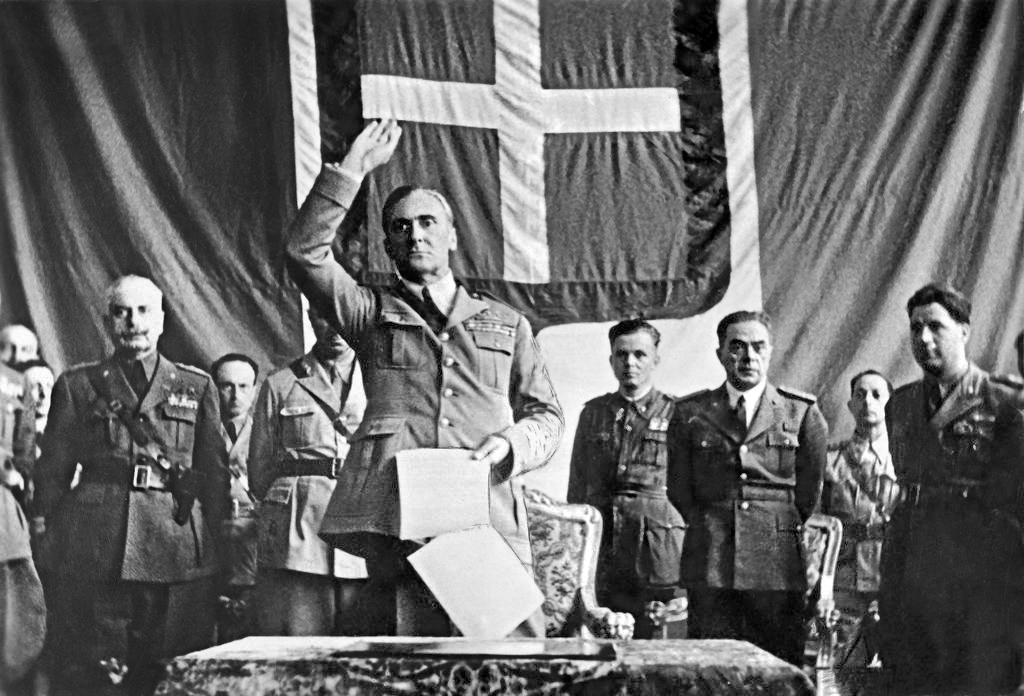
Graziani in Ethiopia, 1937.

During the Second Italo-Ethiopian War, as the Governor of Italian Somaliland, Graziani became the commander of the southern front. Despite orders to limit himself to an active defensive posture, intended to divert Ethiopian forces from possible counter-attacks from the south against Emilio De Bono's troops, Graziani disobeyed these instructions on 3 October. He authorised the execution of the "Milan Plan", a series of limited offensive thrusts along the entire front aimed at eliminating troublesome enemy garrisons and testing their resistance. Within about twenty days, Graziani seized the frontier posts of Dolo, Shilavo and Tefere Katama, which were fiercely defended by the troops of Afawarq Walda Samayat. These battles reached their peak on 10 October with the first chemical attack of the conflict carried out against the fort of Gorrahei. Gorrahei subsequently became the main objective of the "Gorizia Plan", launched on 28 October. However, it fell into Italian hands only on 6 November, largely because heavy rains slowed the advance.

Encouraged by the easy capture of Gorrahei, Graziani ordered General Pietro Maletti to pursue the fleeing enemy with motorised units. This action, on the one hand, facilitated the occupation of Kebri Dahar and led to the destruction of several Ethiopian units; on the other hand, it exposed Maletti’s men to enemy initiative. The pursuit proved risky and, on 11 November, Ethiopian reinforcements positioned along the banks of the Gerer River, under the command of the daring Fitawrari Guangul Kolase, launched a violent ambush on Maletti's column. After three hours of intense fighting and the loss of four light tanks, Maletti ordered a retreat to Kebri Dahar. This setback essentially immobilized the southern front, which greatly frustrated Graziani.

As early as 15 December 1935, General Graziani informed Minister Alessandro Lessona that he considered it necessary to employ every type of weapon "against the barbarian hordes" and requested "freedom of action in the use of poison gas". The following day, Mussolini himself authorised the general, stating: "I approve the use of gas if Your Excellency deems it necessary for supreme reasons of defence".

In mid December 1935, Ras Desta Damtew led an Ethiopian force from Negele Borana with the aim of bypassing the Italian fortified camp at Dolo and invading Italian Somaliland. After learning of these plans, Graziani ordered extensive aerial bombing attacks, including the use of gas, which repeatedly struck the advancing Ethiopian forces and even hit the Swedish medical unit accompanying Ras Desta’s troops. Additional sorties by Italian-led irregular forces disrupted Ethiopian movements, causing confusion and preventing some Ethiopian units from joining the planned offensive. With Ethiopian forces trapped between the Ganale Doria and Daua Parma rivers and far from their supply bases, Graziani launched a major counteroffensive on 10 January 1936 using a motorised force of about 14,000 men supported by air power. On 17 January, Graziani personally led a fast column toward Negele Borana, which was captured on 20 January after Ethiopian resistance collapsed. The remaining forces of Ras Desta withdrew into nearby forests while Italian troops secured the region.

After the victory over Ras Desta, Ethiopian troops under the command of Nasibu Zeamanuel and Wehib Pasha reorganized Ethiopian defences in the Ogaden. On 14 April, Graziani launched a large offensive against them with three columns commanded by Generals Guglielmo Nasi, Luigi Frusci, and Augusto Agostini. Despite difficult weather and pockets of resistance, Italian forces gradually advanced, capturing several key positions and breaking Ethiopian defensive lines. By late April, the Italian columns had taken Degehabur and surrounding strongholds, completing the first phase of the operation and preparing for the final advance toward Harar.

Addis Ababa fell to Badoglio on 5 May 1936. Graziani had wanted to reach Harar before Badoglio reached Addis Ababa, but failed to do so. Even so, on 9 May, Graziani was rewarded for his role as commander of the southern front with a promotion to the rank of Marshal of Italy. During his tour of an Ethiopian Orthodox church in Dire Dawa, Graziani fell into a pit covered by an ornate carpet, a trap that he believed had been set by the Ethiopian priests to injure or kill him. As a result, he held Ethiopian clerics in deep suspicion.

Graziani was made Viceroy of Italian East Africa in June 1936. Following Badoglio's resignation, Graziani had numerous public buildings constructed, making use of local manpower and resources. This was accompanied by a harsh repression by the Italians. Prison camps were set up, public gallows were erected, and suspected rebels were executed. After an unsuccessful attempt by two Eritreans to kill him on 19 February 1937 (and after murders of other Italians in occupied Ethiopia), Graziani ordered a bloody and indiscriminate reprisal upon the conquered country, later remembered by Ethiopians as Yekatit 12. Up to thirty thousand civilians of Addis Ababa were killed indiscriminately; another 1,469 were summarily executed by the end of the next month, and over one thousand Ethiopian notables were imprisoned and then exiled from Ethiopia. Graziani became known as "the Butcher of Ethiopia". In connection with the attempt on his life, Graziani authorized the massacre of the monks of the ancient monastery of Debre Libanos and a large number of pilgrims, who had traveled there to celebrate the feast day of the founding saint of the monastery. Graziani's suspicion of the Ethiopian Orthodox clergy (and the fact that the wife of one of the assassins had briefly taken sanctuary at the monastery) had convinced him of the monks' complicity in the attempt on his life. The excesses of Graziani led Mussolini, who had previously supported his methods, to replace him at the end of 1937 with Prince Amedeo, Duke of Aosta, while the country was in the midst of a widespread uprising.

== World War II ==
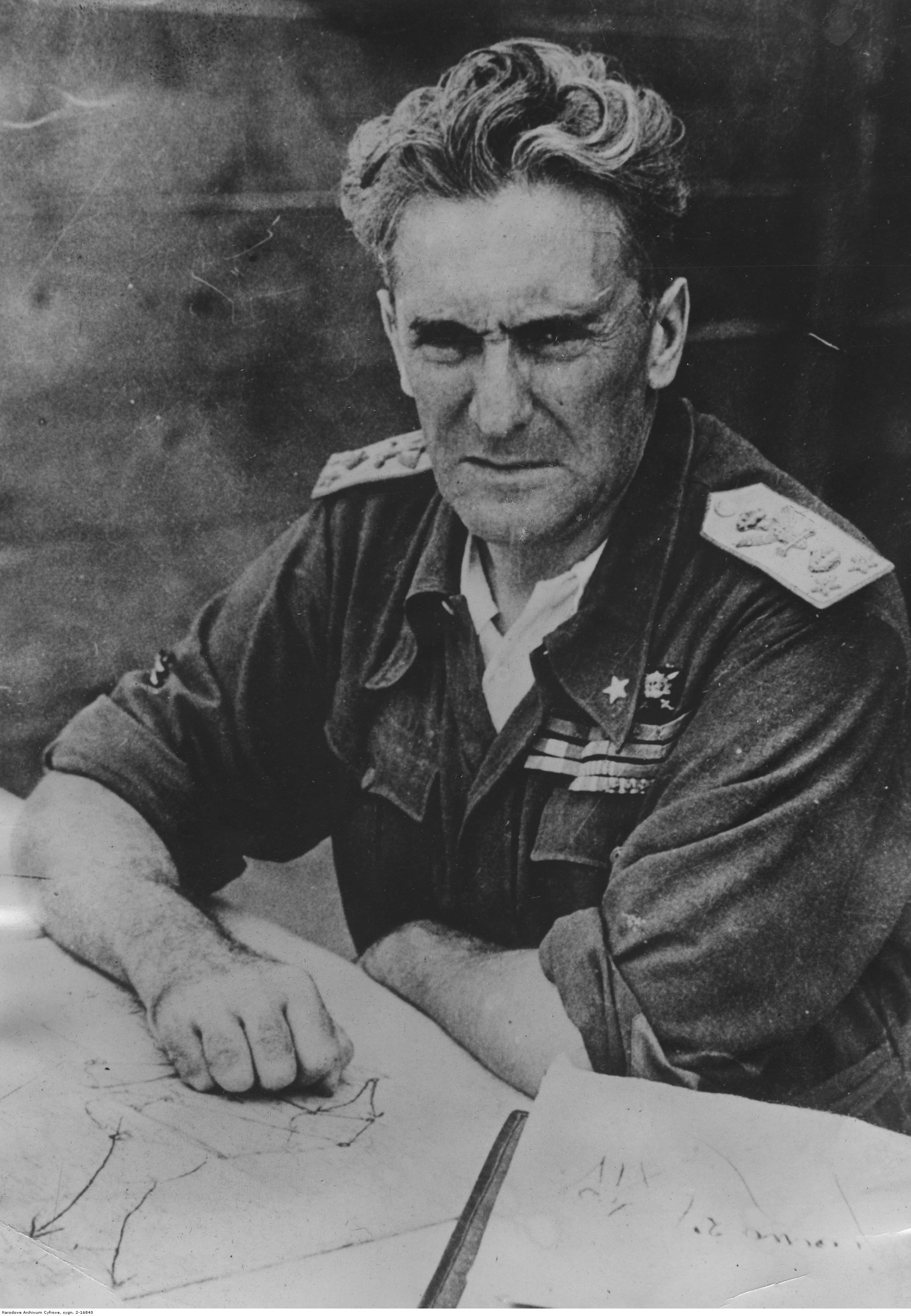
Graziani in 1940

On 3 November 1939, with the Second World War already underway but Italy still neutral, Graziani, now styled 1st Marquis of Neghelli, became Commander-in-Chief of the Regio Esercito's General Staff. This position placed him directly under Mussolini, King Victor Emmanuel III of Savoy, and Badoglio himself, with whom he had long-standing personal animosity. Although opposed to Italy’s entry into the conflict, shortly after the declaration of war on 10 June 1940, Graziani took part in several minor operations against France. On 24 June, the French requested an armistice, and four days later, Graziani returned to Rome.

Back in the capital, he learned of the death of Marshal Italo Balbo in a friendly fire incident on 28 June 1940. Graziani took his place as Governor of Libya and Commander-in-Chief of Italian North Africa. The Italian dictator Benito Mussolini had given Graziani a deadline of 8 August 1940 to invade Egypt with the 10th Army. Graziani doubted the ability of his largely unmechanized force to defeat the British and put off the invasion for as long as he could. However, faced with demotion, Graziani ultimately followed orders, and four divisions of the 10th Army invaded Egypt on 9 September against the British screening forces. Mussolini had denied the one-month postponement requested by Graziani, explicitly "taking responsibility for the decision" and warning that failure to comply would result in Graziani's replacement. Galeazzo Ciano noted in his diary: "Never has a military operation been carried out so reluctantly by its commanders."

After brief skirmishes with the British forces, the Italians had captured Sidi Barrani on 16 September, and the British withdrew to Mersa Matruh. However, faced by the highly mobile British forces of General Richard O'Connor, Graziani's troops remained stationary for three months. They established large, ineffective, entrenched camps in the desert, poorly connected to one another and supported by only modest mobile reserves. The British counteroffensive of 9 December 1940 (Operation Compass) completely overwhelmed the Italians. Despite being numerically inferior, British forces—fully motorised and equipped with several hundred Matilda and Cruiser tanks—outflanked and encircled the Italian troops, achieving a decisive victory.

Graziani was taken completely by surprise and proved incapable of organising an effective defence. By dispersing his forces into isolated groups rather than concentrating them and forming armoured reserves, he was successively defeated by British forces at Bardia, Tobruk, and Beda Fomm between January and February 1941. The result was a total defeat: approximately 130,000 Italian soldiers were captured, materiel and equipment were almost entirely lost, and the remnants of the shattered Tenth Army retreated to El Agheila, abandoning all of Cyrenaica. Graziani displayed serious shortcomings in both tactical and strategic leadership and suffered a moral collapse. Despairing even of the defence of Tripolitania, he now requested—after repeatedly refusing it—the deployment of German mechanised forces proposed by Adolf Hitler, the so-called Afrika Korps.

On 11 February 1941, Graziani was dismissed by Mussolini, who was deeply angered by the defeat and by the marshal's conduct of operations. Graziani left Libya and returned to Italy, where several influential political figures immediately demanded and obtained an investigation into his actions; Roberto Farinacci privately accused him of “cowardice”. In November 1941, a commission of inquiry was established under Admiral Paolo Thaon di Revel. In March 1942, the commission concluded its work without taking any action, and for more than two years, Graziani remained without any assignment. From 1941 to 1943, he lived in Anagni.

=== The Italian Social Republic ===
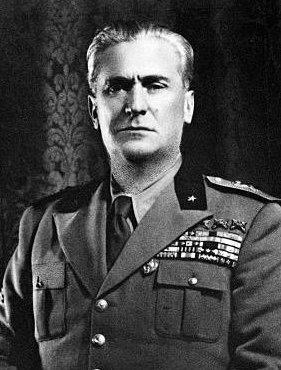
Portrait of Graziani

With the establishment of the Italian Social Republic (RSI), Graziani became Minister of National Defence. The first to offer him the post was Francesco Maria Barracu on 22 September 1943, but Graziani initially refused. The following day, Barracu met him in Rome and again urged him to join the new government, warning—so Graziani later recalled—that "otherwise your refusal could be interpreted as fear." Graziani accepted the challenge. Among his first acts as minister was the approval of conscription decrees for enlistment in the armed forces of the RSI.

Between 1943 and 1944, Graziani signed several calls to arms for the classes born in 1923, 1924, and 1925, subsequently extending conscription to those born in 1920, 1921, and 1926—threatening draft evaders with the death penalty—and finally to the classes of 1916 and 1917. These measures met with little success and instead strengthened the Italian Resistance, as many draft evaders sought refuge within it. At the same time, however, the new RSI army, with approximately 30,000 desertions by the end of April 1944, was already in a process of gradual disintegration. Furthermore, the RSI army was not deployed on the front against the Anglo-American forces as Mussolini had desired, but was instead relegated to various auxiliary units of the German Wehrmacht. Thus, the two RSI divisions, 4th Alpine Division "Monterosa" and 3rd Marine Infantry Division "San Marco" with their 30,000 men, belonged to the German-Italian Army Liguria, which was formally under the command of Graziani, but were only used for coastal defense of Liguria and, above all, for anti- partisan operations in Italy. Of the remaining RSI soldiers, 41,000 were directly under the command of the German High Command, and another 60,000 were assigned as labourers to the other German army corps. Only 43,000 men remained under Graziani's direct command, but these were mainly needed in the regional and provincial commands of the RSI and the local military registration offices.

Graziani worked energetically to ensure that the armed forces of the RSI were unified and could be defined as apolitical, not in an ideological sense but in a strictly military one: directly dependent on central command rather than on the Republican Fascist Party. To impose this vision, he repeatedly threatened to resign and even travelled to Adolf Hitler's headquarters in Germany to confer with the Führer on 9 October 1943. Graziani himself reported the far from encouraging remark Hitler addressed to him upon their meeting: "I am sorry that this thankless task should fall to you." To emphasise the military and nominally apolitical character of his position, from 6 January 1944 the ministry he headed was renamed from the "Ministry of National Defence" to the "Ministry of the Armed Forces". Exploiting his personal prestige, Graziani succeeded in negotiating a compromise favourable to himself. With the exception of the Black Brigades of Alessandro Pavolini, with whom he clashed repeatedly, he gained control over all the armed forces of the RSI—control that was at times largely nominal, since operational command remained in German hands. On 14 August 1944, a legislative decree issued by the Duce incorporated the National Republican Guard into the National Republican Army.

From 2 August 1944, Graziani assumed command of the Army Liguria, comprising the LXXV Army Corps and the "Lombardia" Corps. From 1 December 1944 to 28 February 1945, he also commanded an "Army Group" that included the German 14th Army, which, together with the LI Mountain Corps and the XIV Panzer Corps, fought along the Gothic Line, particularly in the Garfagnana sector. In the Garfagnana area, between the Serchio River and the Apuan Alps, Graziani managed to halt Brazilian units and the forces of the U.S. Fifth Army with the Monterosa Alpine Division. Between 25 and 30 December 1944, during the Battle of Garfagnana, Axis forces succeeded in pushing back elements of the U.S. 92nd Infantry Division ("Buffalo Soldiers"). This was the only engagement on the Italian front in 1944 in which Axis forces managed to push Allied troops back, but the short offensive achieved only local successes and was interrupted by 30 December when reinforcements from the Indian 8th Infantry Division stabilized the front. After this, the four divisions of the Social Republic under the nominal command of Graziani were considered unreliable and therefore relegated to second-line duties in Liguria.

Although Graziani had been part of Mussolini's entourage when it left Milan for Como on the evening of April 25, he remained in Como with his companions rather than continuing the journey and as a result, Graziani avoided the fate that befell Benito Mussolini, who was captured and executed by communist partisans in Dongo. On April 27, Graziani surrendered to Emilio Daddario, a United States intelligence officer of the Office of Strategic Services, in Cernobbio, on the shores of Lake Como. Two days later, German representatives acting on behalf of Heinrich von Vietinghoff, commander-in-chief of German forces in Italy, and Karl Wolff, the "Supreme SS and Police Leader" in the country, signed the Armistice of Caserta. This agreement led to the capitulation of all German forces under the Southwest Command during the night of May 2–3, 1945.

At the end of World War II, Graziani spent a few days in the San Vittore Prison in Milan before he was transferred to Allied control. He was brought back to Algeria in Anglo-American custody and stayed there until February 1946. Allied forces then felt the danger of his assassination or lynching had passed (many thousands of fascists were murdered in Italy in the summer and autumn of 1945), and so moved Graziani to the Procida prison in Italy.

== War crimes and indictments ==
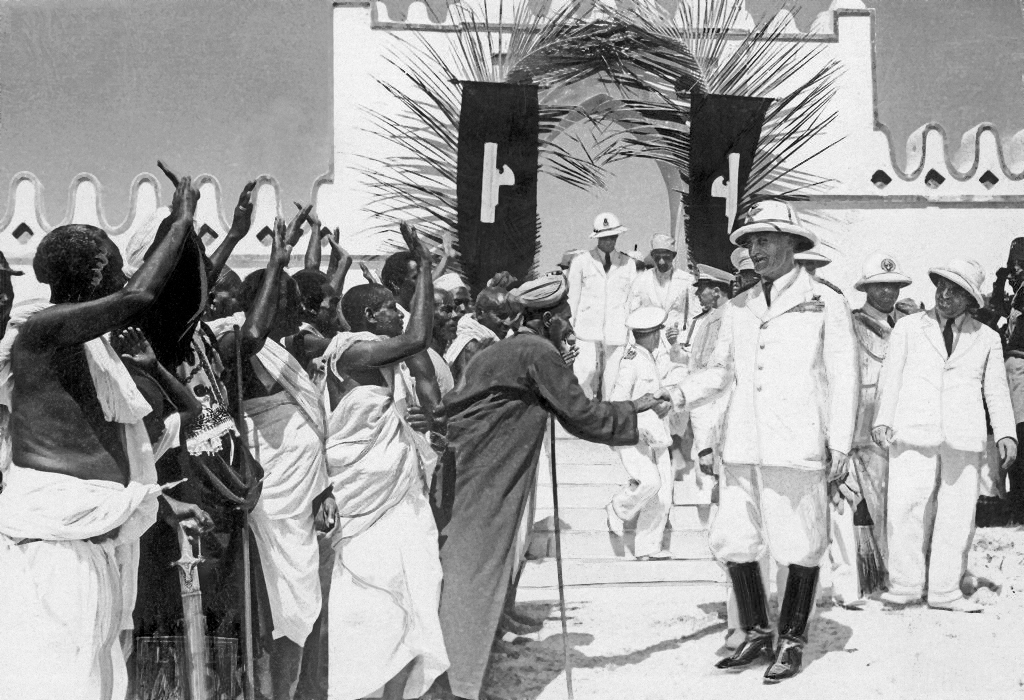
Graziani in Somalia

Before the Second World War, the League of Nations did not prosecute Graziani and the Italian authorities for war crimes in Ethiopia. In one case, Graziani had ordered his troops to use chemical weapons against Nasibu Zeamanuel's troops in Gorrahei on 10 October 1935. Although the Ethiopian Minister of Foreign Affairs gave the League of Nations irrefutable evidence of what the Italian military had done from within a few hours of its invasion on 3 October 1935 to 10 April of the following year, no action was taken. Incidents included the use of poison gas and the bombing of Red Cross hospitals and ambulances.

In 1943, the United States proposed to the Allies replacing the League of Nations with a new body, the United Nations. The United Nations War Crimes Commission was created to investigate allegations of war crimes committed by Axis powers in World War II. On 31 December 1946, Ambaye Wolde Mariam from The Ethiopian War Crimes Commission presented to the UN War Crimes Commission its preliminary findings against Graziani. This, however, is related to the period before WWII. The Ethiopian government felt it would have no difficulty from the sufficient amount of evidence it had to justify a trial against Graziani, especially for the massacres he ordered in February 1937. On 4 March 1948, charges against Graziani were presented to the United Nations War Crimes Commission. The commission was presented with evidence of the Italian policy of systematic terrorism and Graziani's admitted intention to execute all local authorities and cited a telegram from Graziani to General Nasi, in which Graziani had written, "Keep in mind also that I have already aimed at the total destruction of Abyssinian chiefs and notables and that this should be carried out completely in your territories". The UN Commission agreed that there was a prima facie case against eight Italians, including Graziani.

However, the Allies questioned the veracity of Ethiopia's claim against the Italians on the grounds that it was impossible to identify which individuals in the Italian military hierarchy had actually issued the criminal orders. The British government was the firmest supporter of that stance, and the United States pursued a policy "largely characterized by ambivalence towards Italian aggression". The Ethiopian government made a direct request to the "Four Policemen", but that was immediately rejected on technical grounds. In addition, many in the Italian press firmly opposed any Italian officer being put on trial for war crimes. Faced with such resistance and indifference, Ethiopia had no choice but to back down from their requests, to the consternation of many Ethiopians.

On 2 May 1950, an Italian military tribunal sentenced Graziani to 19 years in jail for collaborating with the Nazis, but he was released after only four months because his lawyers demonstrated that his actions had been only after he "received orders". He never faced any further prosecutions for any other specific war crimes. Unlike the Germans and the Japanese, the Italians did not have their commanders subjected to prosecutions by Allied tribunals.

== Political career and death ==
In the early 1950s, Graziani had some involvement with the neo-fascist Italian Social Movement (MSI), and he became the "Honorary President" of the party in 1953. Though the MSI saw Graziani as a figurehead, they also believed politically he could not be trusted as he had too often refused to obey the party’s directives. He would later explain his motivations for joining the group:

I joined the MSI because it mirrors my beliefs and convictions. However, it would be absurd to think that a new Fascist dictatorship could be set up today. History teaches us that dictatorships don’t spring up like mushrooms.

During the summer of 1954, Graziani resigned from the MSI.

By autumn 1954, Graziani was losing strength, and he began experiencing mounting health issues. His mental health had deteriorated to the point that he sometimes woke up thinking he was still imperial viceroy in Addis Ababa. By year's end, he was suffering from acute pain and on 26 December 1954, he underwent surgery. It went well, and he began recovering during the first week of January 1955. On 10 January, his health suddenly declined rapidly. At midnight, he went into a coma, briefly regaining consciousness at 4 am and stating his later words, ‘If my time has come, I'll go calmly to be judged by God’. He died in Rome at 6 am on 11 January 1955 at the age of 72.

More than 100,000 people came to his funeral in front of the church of Saint Bellarmino in Rome. Crowds holding banners, singing hymns and giving fascist salutes packed the streets.

=== Mausoleum controversy ===
In August 2012, $160,000 of public money was used to help finance the building of a large monument atop Graziani's tomb in Affile. The subscription was supplemented by private funding from the mayor of Affile, Ercole Viri. The new mausoleum was engraved with the words "Fatherland" and "Honor". Local left-wing politicians and national commentators harshly criticized the monument, whereas the town's "mostly conservative" population approved. Public funding for the Graziani monument was suspended by the newly elected Lazio administration after the 2013 regional elections. A statement from Ethiopia's Ministry of Foreign Affairs said Graziani did not deserve to be memorialized but instead be condemned in history for his war crimes, genocidal behavior and crimes against humanity. In 2017, Viri and two other Affile town councillors were convicted of the crime of "fascism apology" for building the monument and were given jail sentences, although the court did not order the removal of the monument.

== Books ==
Graziani wrote several books, the most important of which are:

- Ho difeso la Patria (una vita per l'Italia)
- Africa settentrionale 1940–41
- Libia redenta

also:

- Verso il Fezzan
- La riconquista del Fezzan
- Cirenaica pacificata
- Pace romana in Libia
- Il Fronte Sud

== List of titles held ==
- 1915–1918—Service in World War I
- 1921–1934—Service in Libya
- 1926–1930—Vice Governor-General of Italian Cyrenaica
- 1930–1934—Governor-General of Italian Cyrenaica
- 1935–1936—Governor-General of Italian Somaliland
- 1936–1937—Governor-General and Viceroy of Ethiopia; promoted to Marshal of Italy
- 1940–1941—Commander-in-Chief of Italian North Africa and Governor-General of Libya
- 1943–1945—Minister of Defence for the Italian Social Republic

== In popular culture ==
Graziani was portrayed by British actor Oliver Reed in the 1981 war film Lion of the Desert. On its release, it was banned by the Italian government because, in the words of Prime Minister Giulio Andreotti, it was "damaging to the honor of the army".

Graziani was also portrayed by Rodolfo Dal Pra in the Italian film Last Days of Mussolini.

The Italian singer and composer Franco Battiato included a reference to Graziani in his song "Lettera al Governatore della Libia" (Letter to the governor of Libya) with the phrase "Lo sai che quell'idiota di Graziani farà una brutta fine" (You know that the idiotic Graziani will have a bad end).

== See also ==
- Frontier Wire (Libya)

== Bibliography ==
- Canosa, Romano. Graziani. Il maresciallo d'Italia, dalla guerra d'Etiopia alla Repubblica di Salò. Editore Mondadori; Collana: Oscar storia. ISBN 9788804537625
- Cova, Alessandro. Rodolfo Graziani: Story of an Italian general. Fonthill Media, 2021, ISBN 9781781558515.
- Del Boca, AngeloNaissance de la nation libyenne, Editions Milelli, 2008, ISBN 978-2-916590-04-2.
- Pankhurst, Richard. History of the Ethiopian Patriots (1936–1940), The Graziani Massacre and Consequences. Addis Abeba Tribune editions.
- Rocco, Giuseppe. L'organizzazione militare della RSI, sul finire della seconda guerra mondiale. Greco & Greco Editori. Milano, 1998

Government offices
Preceded by Pietro Badoglio	Viceroy and Governor-General of Italian East Africa; 11 June 1936 – 21 December 1937	Succeeded by Amedeo, 3rd Duke of Aosta
Military offices
Preceded by Italo Balbo	Commander-in-Chief of Italian North Africa and Governor-General of Italian Libya; 28 June 1940 – 25 March 1941	Succeeded by Italo Gariboldi
