= Yousaf Borahil Al-Msmare =

Libyan resistance leader

Youssef Borahil al-Mismari يوسف بورحيل المسماري
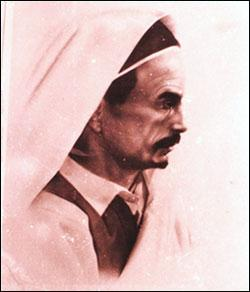

Leader of Senussi Tribal Military
- In office 16 September – 19 December 1931
- Preceded by: Omar al-Mukhtar

Personal details
- Born: 1886 Marj, Ottoman Libya
- Died: 19 December 1931 (aged 44–45)
- Known for: Leading Arab native resistance to Italian colonization of Libya
- Religion: Sunni Islam

Military service
- Allegiance: Senussi Order
- Branch/service: Senussid Military Adwar
- Battles/wars: Italo-Turkish War; First World War; Senussi campaign; Pacification of Libya

Yousaf Borahil al-Mismari (Arabic: يوسف بورحيل المسماري) (ca. 1886 — 19 December 1931) was a Libyan revolutionary who fought against the Italian colonization of Libya. He also served as the deputy leader of the Libyan Jihad after the death of Omar Al-Mokhtar, who was captured at the Battle of Uadi Bu Taga on 9 September 1931 and executed at Soluch on 16 September. Al-Mismari was killed in action after a confrontation with Italian security forces in Libya at the age of 45.
