= Slonta =

Slonta اسلنطة Suluntah
- Town
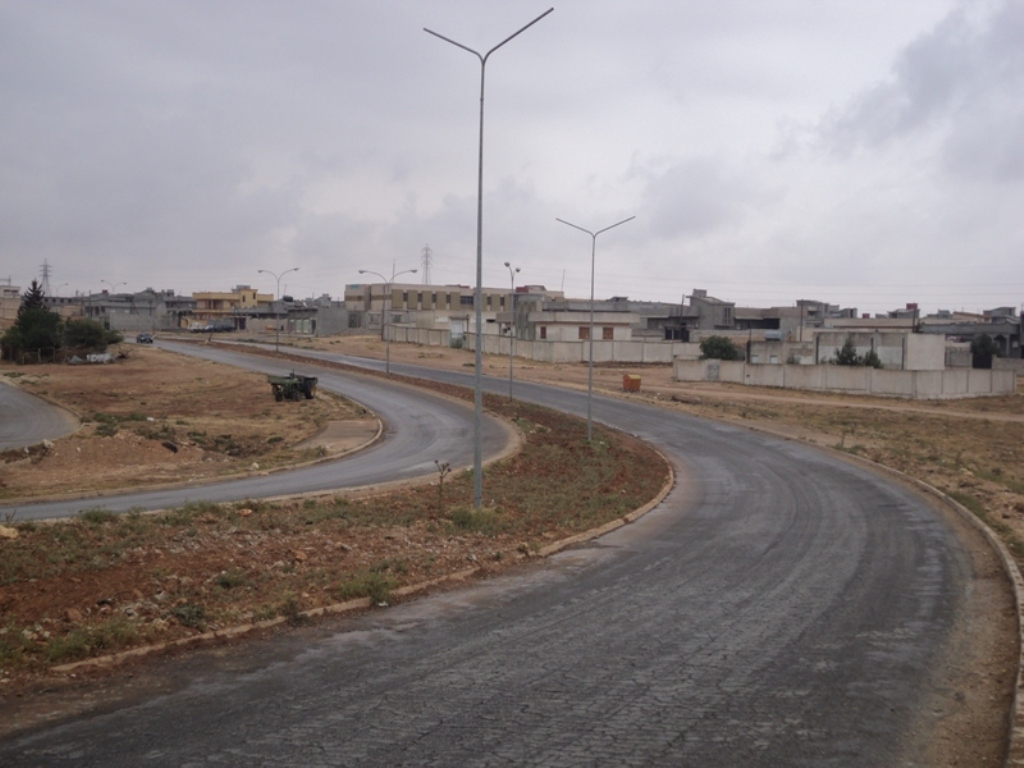

- Location in Libya
- Coordinates: 32°35′25″N 21°42′57″E
- Country: Libya
- Region: Cyrenaica
- District: Jabal al Akhdar

Population (2006)
  - Total: 2,674
- Time zone: UTC +2

Slonta or Suluntah (Arabic: اسلنطة) is a town in the District of Jabal al Akhdar about 27 kilometres (17 mi) south of the city of Bayda. It is noted for its ruins of a pre-Greek temple for the Berber people, that used to be in a cave which has since collapsed.
