= Battle of Esc-Scebb =

Battle of Esc-Scèbb
- Part of First Italo-Senussi War
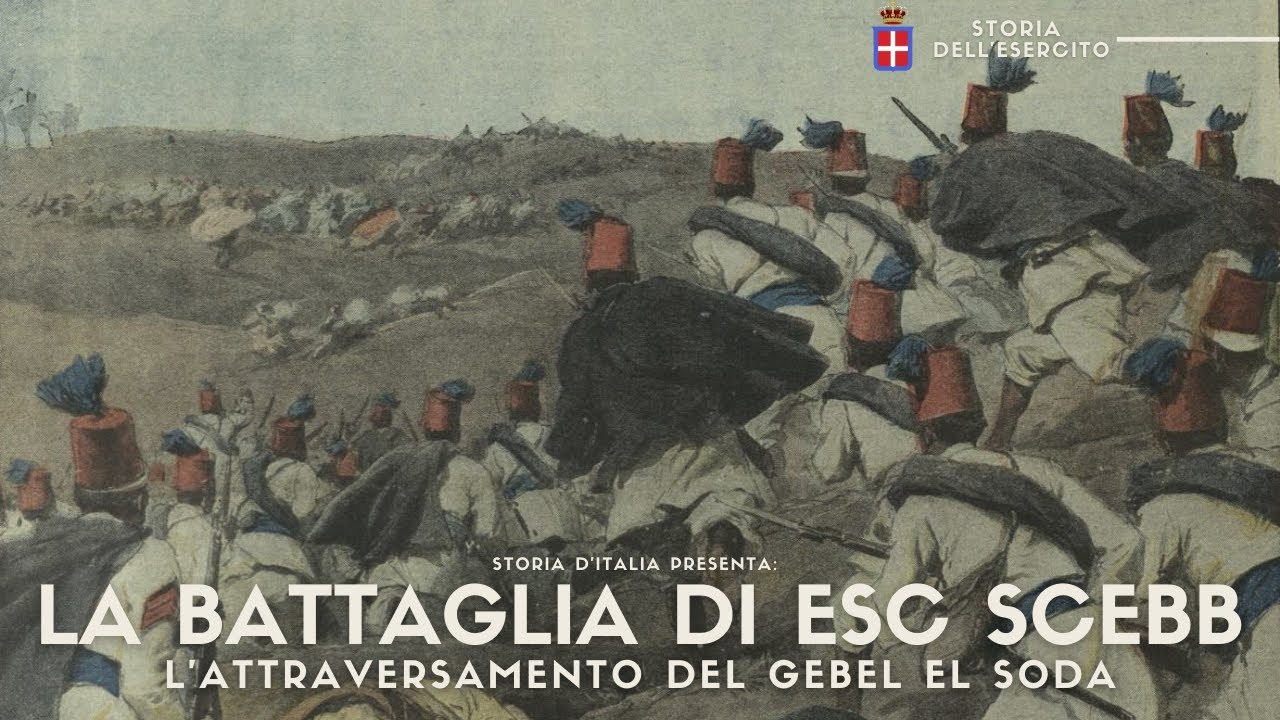
- Soldiers fighting during the battle
Date	8 December 1913
Location	Near Esc-Scebb (today Sabha), Libya
Result	Italian victory
Territorial changes	Full Italian conquest of the region of Fezzan

Belligerents
Kingdom of Italy	Senussi Order

Commanders and leaders
(Kingdom of Italy) Antonio Giuseppe Miani (Kingdom of Italy) De Dominicis (DOW)	Bel Gasim el Beddi †; Omar Abd el Nebi †

Strength
1,405 men 1,765 camels 10 artillery pieces 2 batteries	600 men 60 camels

Casualties and losses
(Kingdom of Italy) 3 dead and 6 wounded	100 dead and wounded

The Battle of Esc-Scèbb, also known as the Battle of the Esc-Scèbb wells, was fought on 8 December 1913 in the fields north of Esc-Scebb, between the departments of the Regio Esercito, commanded by lieutenant Antonio Giuseppe Miani and the Libyan guerrillas of Mohammed ben Abdallah. The battle can be classified as part of the First phase of the Italian colonization of Libya.

== Background ==
In August 1913, a military expedition composed of 1,100 men (only 108 nationals, and the rest colonial), 4 70/15 Mod. 1902 mountain guns, 4 Vickers machine guns, 4 light trucks and 1,765 camels, commanded by Lieutenant Antonio Giuseppe Miani, left Sirte heading towards Socna. This location, defined as "The gate of Fezzan", was decided as a support base for the Italian penetration into the desert region of Fezzan, which until then had remained under Ottoman control until October 1912, and then in the hands of the Libyan guerrillas by 1913. Miani, promoted to lieutenant colonel of the General Staff, was chosen, at the end of April 1913, by the then Minister of the Colonies, the Honorable Bertolini, to lead a military expedition into the Libyan hinterland. The occupation of Fezzan was initially planned and studied by the previous Governor of the Colony, Lieutenant General Ragni and then by his successor, General Garioni and considered of primary importance to consolidate the Italian occupation of the Fourth Shore. (Note: The "Fourth Shore", (in Italian: Quarta Sponda) was the name given to the coastal region of Libya at the time of the colonization by the Italians.) After a brief stop in Socna, the expedition left in the first days of December and crossed the Gebel el-Soda entering Fezzan.

== Battle ==
On 8 December 1913, around 2 PM, the vanguard of the Miani expedition spotted a large quantity of camels from afar, around 60, escorted by around 600 armed men. The men under the command of Lieutenant Colonel Miani, who had just set foot in Fezzan with the task of occupying it, until that moment unopposed, are preparing for their first clash against Mohammed Ben Abdallah's fighters. The enemy column was moving to carry out an outflanking maneuver aimed at hitting the rear and flank of the Italian formation.

The column continued to move in the same direction, but Captain Streva's Libyan group broke away from it and had to divert its march, head north and stop the advance of the enemy frontally, assisted by the artillery fire of the Mondini battery. In the meantime, the 1st and 2nd Eritrean companies, under the command of Major Suarez and positioned on the left flank of the column, began an outflanking movement to the south which with a rapid turn towards the west would have denied any enemy attempt to reach the oasis of Esc Scebb. Supporting the advance of the Eritreans was the Locurcio battery, located 400 meters away with the Mondini battery. Around 2:30 PM the clash began, the guerrillas taken by surprise stopped their march and sought shelter to return fire. The artillery did not stand by and watched, they placed the pieces in ten minutes and at 2:55 PM they opened fire on the Libyan guerrillas, firing a total of 72 shots in a short time. Supported by the artillery, the Eritrean companies advanced in large leaps towards the enemy, managing to disperse the caravan. De Dominicis and his men also managed to capture the head of Bel Gasim el Beddi, commander of the battle on the side of the Libyan militants, who died shortly afterwards. The second in command, Omar Abd el Nebi, also lost his life with him. The guerrillas lost about a hundred men, including about eighty near the wells during the battle and the rest in the ruinous retreat after it. The Italians left only three dead and six wounded on the field, including Captain Giorgetti who was wounded in the right leg.
