= Italian Cyrenaica =

1911–1934 Italian possession in North Africa

Italian Cyrenaica Cirenaica Italiana (Italian) برقة الايطالية (Arabic)
- 1911–1934
- Flag Coat of arms

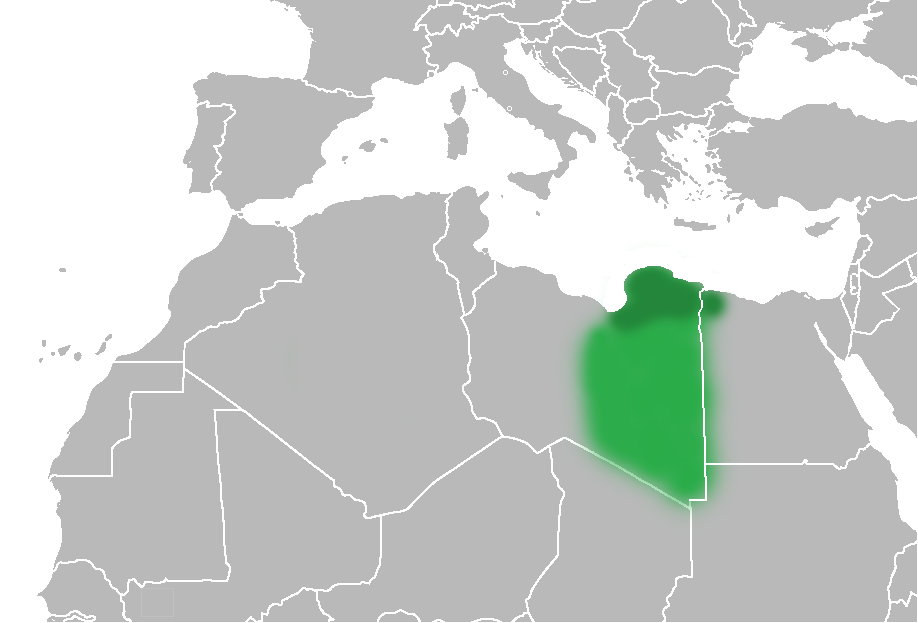
- Status: Colony of the Kingdom of Italy
- Capital: Bengasi
- Common languages: Italian; Arabic
- Religion: Islam; Roman Catholicism
- Monarch
  - 1912–1934: Victor Emmanuel III
- Governor (Note: After Pietro Badoglio became the Governor of Tripolitania and Cyrenaica in January 1929 the Governor of Cyrenaica became Vice-Governor.)
  - 1912–1913 (first): Ottavio Briccola
  - 1930–1934 (last): Rodolfo Graziani
- Historical era: Interwar period
  - Italian sovereignty: 5 November 1911
  - Ottoman withdrawal: 18 October 1912
  - Cyrenaica colony: 17 May 1919
  - Administratively joined to Tripolitania: 18 December 1928
  - Part of Italian Libya: 1 January 1934
Preceded by	Succeeded by
Ottoman Tripolitania	Italian Libya

Italian Cyrenaica (Italian: Cirenaica Italiana; Arabic: برقة الايطالیة) was an Italian colony, located in present-day eastern Libya, that existed from 1911 to 1934. It was part of the territory conquered from the Ottoman Empire during the Italo-Turkish War of 1911, alongside Italian Tripolitania.

The territory of the two colonies was sometimes referred to as "Italian Libya" or Italian North Africa (Africa Settentrionale Italiana, or ASI). Both names were also used after their unification, with Italian Libya becoming the official name of the newly combined colony.

In 1923, indigenous rebels associated with the Senussi Order organized the Libyan resistance movement against Italian settlement in Libya. The rebellion was put down by Italian forces in 1932, after the so-called "pacification campaign", which resulted in the deaths of a quarter of Cyrenaica's local population.

In 1934, it became part of Italian Libya.

== History ==
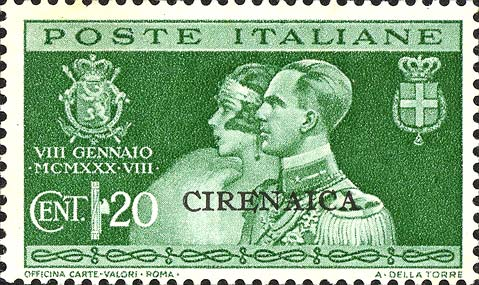
Stamp of Italian Cyrenaica

Italian Cyrenaica and Italian Tripolitania were formed in 1911, during the conquest of Ottoman Tripolitania in the Italo-Turkish War.

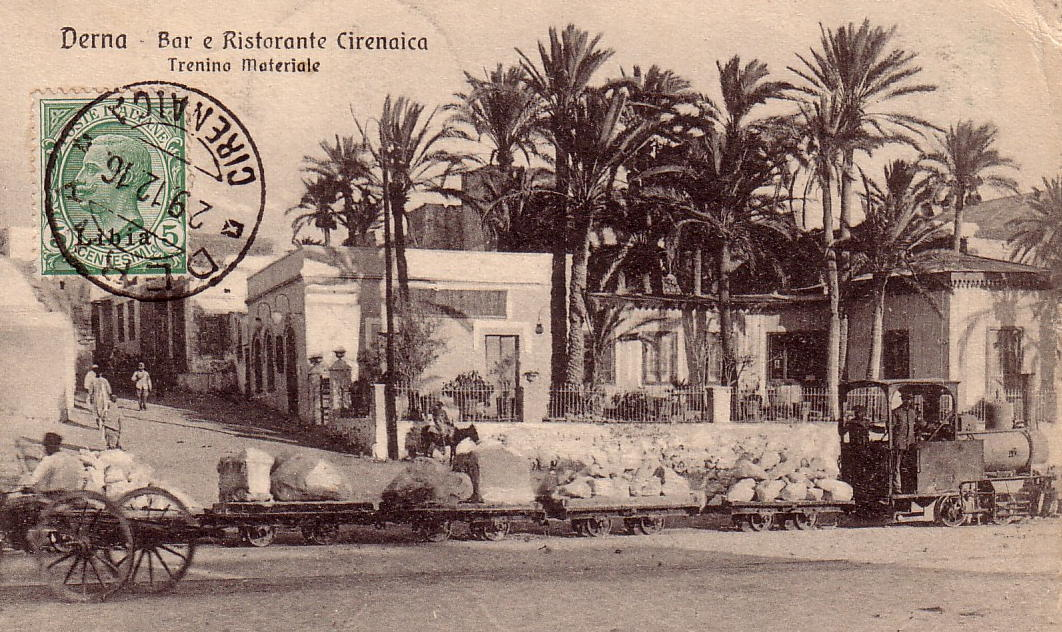
Derna - Bar and restaurant Cirenaica - Goods train (stamped on 29 December 1916)

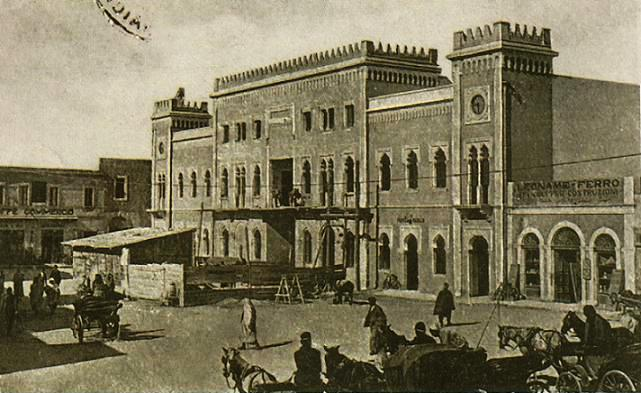
The Italian Benghazi Municipio (City Hall) in the 1920s

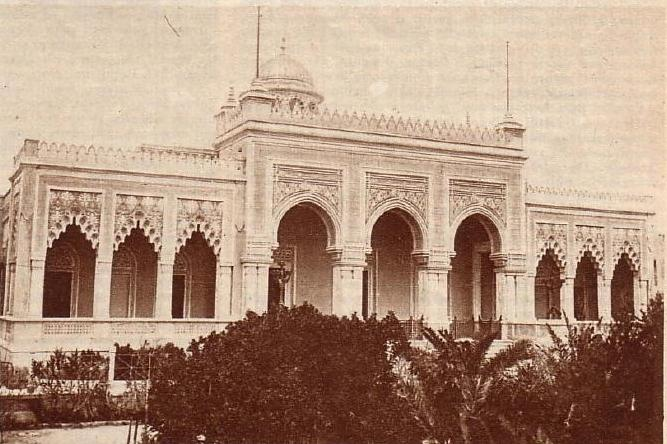
The Palazzo Littorio, later called the "Parliament of Cyrenaica", built in 1927

In the 1920s, Cyrenaica was the scene of fighting between Italian colonial forces and Libyan rebels who were fighting for independence from colonial rule. In 1931, the rebel independence leader Omar Mukhtar was captured and executed.

Fascist Italy maintained several concentration camps in Eastern Libya during the first phase of its occupation of that country. The colonial administration began in 1929 the nearly wholesale deportation of the people of the Jebel Akhdar to deny the rebels the support of the local population.

The forced migration of more than 100,000 people ended in concentration camps in Suluq, El Magrun, Abyar and El Agheila where tens of thousands died in squalid conditions, mainly because of epidemics like the Spanish flu. The concentration camps were dismantled after 1934 when the fascist regime obtained full control of the area and started a policy of assimilation of the local Arab community. This policy was so successful that in 1940 there were two colonial military divisions of Arab Libyans.

In the late 1930s, Cyrenaica was populated by more than 20,000 Italian colonists, mainly around the coast. As a consequence, there was a large economic development effort in the second half of the 1930s.

Italy carried out massive investment in the infrastructure of Libya (the purpose was to develop the economy for the benefit of Greater Italy). In Benghazi -for the first time in Cyrenaica's History- the first manufacturing installations were created: some industries were created in 'Bengasi italiana' in the early 1930s, that included salt processing, oil refining, food processing, cement manufacturing, tanning, brewing and sponge and tuna fishing. The port of Benghazi was enlarged and a modern Hospital. Also a new airport was built nearby was created.

In 1934, Italian Cyrenaica and Italian Tripolitania became part of Italian Libya.

== Demography ==
In the late 1930s, Cyrenaica was populated by more than 20,000 Italian colonists, mainly around the coast. As a consequence, there was a large economic development effort in the second half of the 1930s.

Initially the Italian aim was to drive the local population to the marginal land in the interior and to resettle the Italian population in the most fertile lands of Libya, but since 1938 the new governor Italo Balbo changed this policy in order to get the approval from the native population. The Italians did not provide the Libyans with adequate education until Balbo: the Italian population (about 15% of the total population) had 81 elementary schools in 1938, while the Libyans (more than 75% of total population) had 97.

In Cirenaica were founded -for the Italian colonists- the rural villages of Baracca, Maddalena, Oberdan, D’Annunzio and Battisti in 1938, successively Mameli and Filzi in 1939. For Libyan families (who contributed with many soldiers enrolled in the two Italian-Libyan Divisions: The 1st Libyan Division and 2nd Libyan Division were created in Cyrenaica in the villages of Gedida-Nuova, Nahida-Risorta, Zahra- Fiorita and el-Fager-Alba.

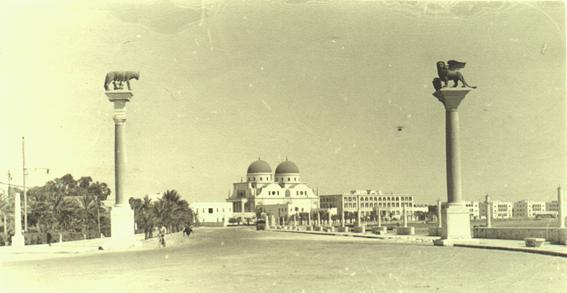
Panorama of Italian Benghazi with the Catholic Cathedral connected to the Via Vittoria and the two columns featuring the Lion of Venice and the Capitoline Wolf

== Infrastructure ==
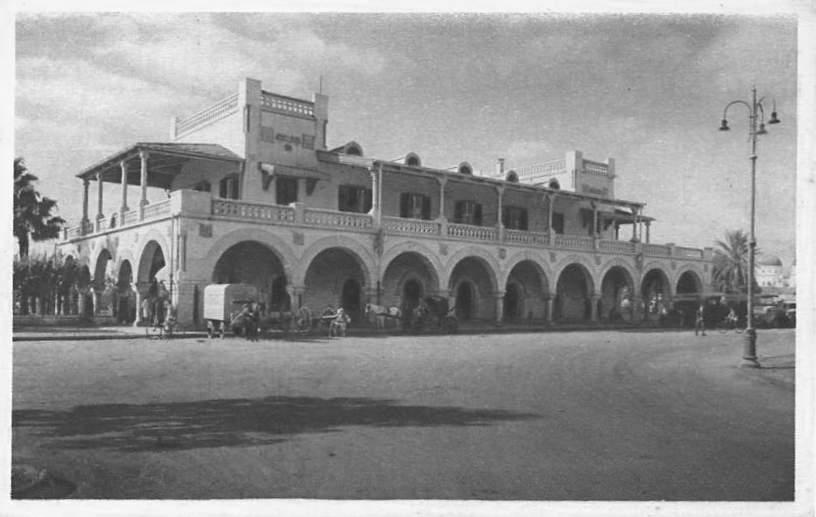
Benghazi railway station in 1930

The Italians implemented major infrastructure projects in Italian Cyrenaica, mainly in the 1930s; the most important were the coastal road between Tripoli and Benghazi, the railways Benghazi-Barce and Benghazi-Soluch, and the enlargement of the Port of Benghazi.

A group of villages with all the needed communications (and infrastructures) for Italians and Libyans were established in coastal Cyrenaica during the 1930s.

== Main military and political developments ==
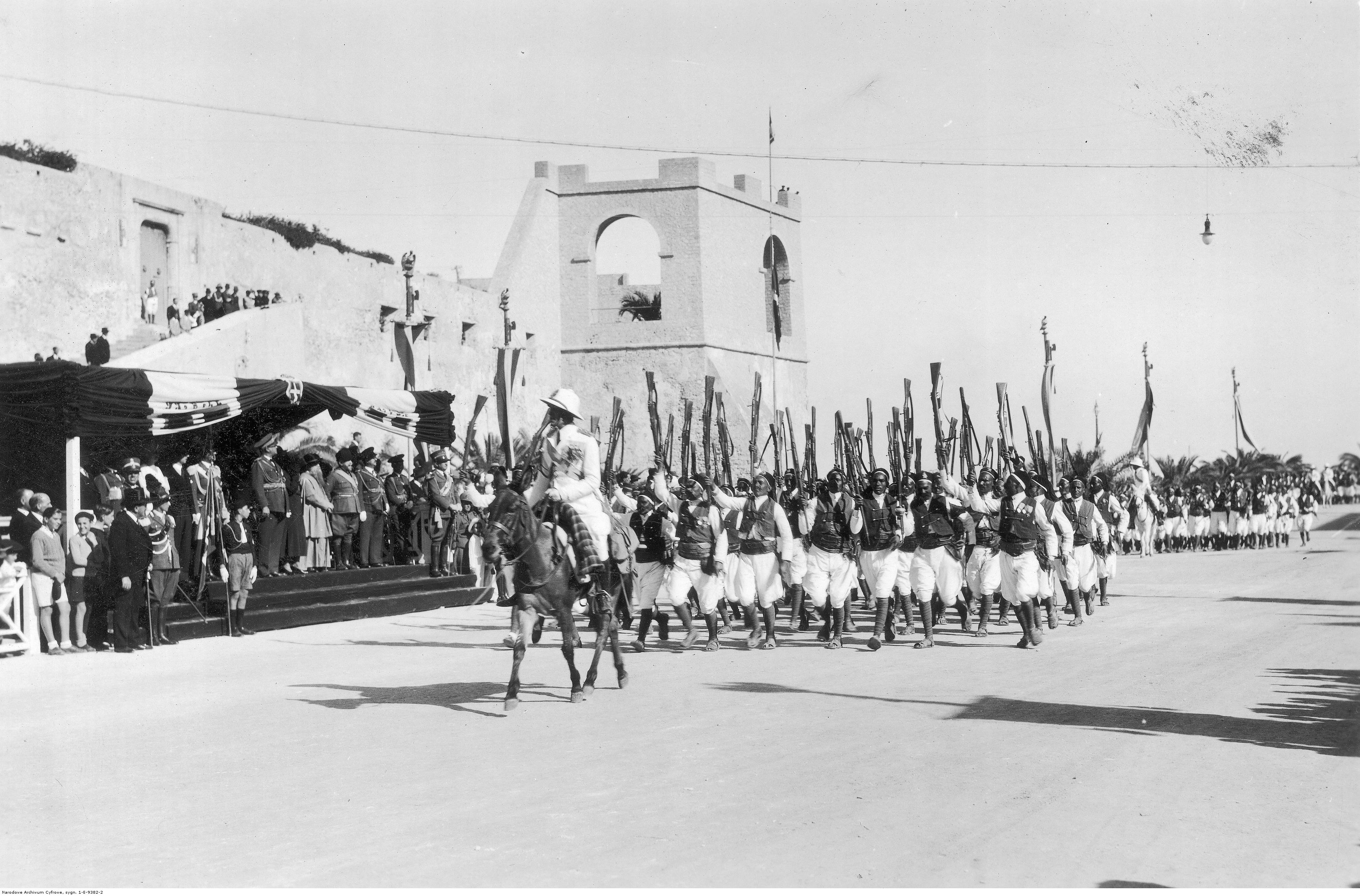
Parade of Libyan colonial troops in front of King Victor Emanuel III and Governor Rodolfo Graziani during the King's visit in Cyrenaica in February 1932

- 1911: Beginning of the Italo-Turkish War. Italian conquest of Tobruk, Derna, and Benghazi.
- 1912: Treaty of Lausanne ends the Italo-Turkish war. Ottoman Empire ceded Tripolitania and Cyrenaica.
- 1917-21: Series of agreements (signed at Acroma, Ar Rajma, Bu Mariam respectively) between Italians and Senussis, led by Sayyid Idris, resulted in the postponement of conflict.
- 1923: Italian governor, Luigi Bongiovanni declares the cancellation of treaties with Senussis, and Italian forces occupy Ajdabiya, capital of the Senussi emirate, launching the reconquest of Cyrenaica. Senussi resistance led by Omar Mukhtar begins.
- 1925: Italo-Egyptian treaty defines the Cyrenaican (later Libyan)-Egyptian border.
- 1926: Conquest of Al-Jaghbub.
- Winter 1927-8: Launching the "29th Parallel line operations", as a result of coordination between the governments of Tripolitania and Cyrenaica, led to the conquest of gulf of Sidra, and linking the two colonies.
- 1929: Pietro Badoglio becomes a unique governor of Tripolitania and Cyrenaica. Beginning of Sidi Rhuma talks with Omar Mukhtar, but they failed eventually.
- 1931: Occupying of Kufra Oases, constructing the barbed wire on the Libyan-Egyptian border, the capture, and then the execution of Omar Mukhtar.
- 1932: Badoglio declares the end of Libyan resistance.
- 1934: Cyrenaica is incorporated in Colony of Libya.

== Bibliography ==
- Chapin Metz, Helen. Libya: A Country Study. Washington: GPO for the Library of Congress, 1987.
- Sarti, Durand. The Ax within: Italian Fascism in Action. Modern Viewpoints. New York, 1974.

== See also ==
- List of colonial governors of Italian Cyrenaica
- Italian Libya
- Italian Libya Railways
- Italo-Libyans
- Italian concentration camps in Libya
- Jebel Akhdar Mountains
- Benghazi Province
- Derna Province
