= Foreign relations of Libya under Muammar Gaddafi =

The foreign relations of Libya under Muammar Gaddafi (1969–2011) underwent much fluctuation and change. They were marked by severe tension with the West (especially the United States, although relations were normalised in the early 21st century prior to the 2011 civil war) and by other national policies in the Middle East and Africa, including the Libyan government's financial and military support for numerous paramilitary and rebel groups.

== Timeline ==
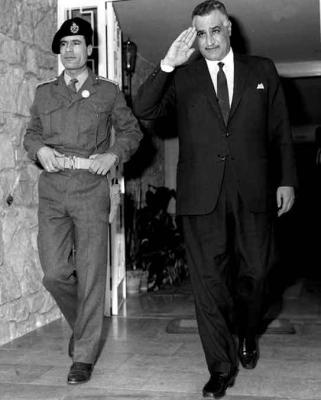
Colonel Gaddafi (left) with Egyptian President Gamal Abdel Nasser in 1969. Gaddafi moved Libya away from the West and sought Pan-Arabism and Pan-Africanism.

Beginning in 1969, Colonel Muammar Gaddafi determined Libya's foreign policy. His principal foreign policy goals were Arab unity, elimination of Israel, advancement of Islam, support for Palestinians, elimination of outside influence in the Middle East and Africa, and support for a range of "revolutionary" causes.

After the 1969 coup d'état, U.S.-Libyan relations became increasingly strained.

Gaddafi closed American and British bases on Libyan territory and partially nationalized all foreign oil and commercial interests in Libya.

=== 1970s ===
Export controls on military equipment and civil aircraft were imposed during the 1970s.

On 11 June 1972, Gaddafi announced that any Arab wishing to volunteer for Palestinian armed groups "can register his name at any Libyan embassy will be given adequate training for combat". He also promised financial support for attacks. In response, the United States withdrew its ambassador.

Gaddafi played a key role in promoting the use of oil embargoes as a political weapon for challenging the West, hoping that an oil price rise and embargo in 1973 would persuade the West—especially the United States—to end support for Israel. Gaddafi rejected both Soviet communism and Western capitalism because he believed that communism was a violation against religion and capitalism was a violation against humanity.

In 1973 the Irish Naval Service intercepted the vessel Claudia in Irish territorial waters, which carried Soviet arms from Libya to the Provisional IRA.

In 1974, the Libyan Embassy in Rome provided financial assistance to assist the escape of Mario Tuti, a member of the neo-fascist Ordine Nero, following the Italicus Express bombing.

During the mid-1970s, Gaddafi supported the unsuccessful attempts for an Argentinian nuclear weapons program, in the hope of acquiring advanced military technology for Libya.

In 1976, he sheltered José López Rega, the leader of the Argentine Anticommunist Alliance death squad, following the 1976 Argentine coup d'état.

In 1976 after a series of terror attacks by the Provisional IRA, Gaddafi announced that "the bombs which are convulsing Britain and breaking its spirit are the bombs of Libyan people. We have sent them to the Irish revolutionaries so that the British will pay the price for their past deeds".

Together with Fidel Castro and other Communist leaders, Gaddafi supported Soviet protege Mengistu Haile Mariam, the military ruler of Ethiopia, who was later convicted for a genocide that killed hundreds of thousands.

Gaddafi funded many national liberation, communist and Maoist groups, including but not limited to; the Palestine Liberation Organization, the African National Congress, the National Patriotic Front of Liberia, the Revolutionary United Front in Sierra Leone, the Popular Front for the Liberation of Palestine, the Black Panther Party, Euskadi Ta Askatasuna, the New People's Army of the Philippines, the FRETILIN, the Polisario Front, the Red Brigades, the Sandinista National Liberation Front, the Tupamaros and the Red Army Faction.

In October 1978, Gaddafi sent Libyan troops to aid Idi Amin in the Uganda–Tanzania War when Amin tried to annex the northern Tanzanian province of Kagera, and Tanzania counterattacked. Amin lost the battle and later fled to exile in Libya, where he remained for almost a year.

Libya also was one of the main supporters of the Polisario Front in the former Spanish Sahara – a nationalist group dedicated to ending Spanish colonialism in the region. The Sahrawi Arab Democratic Republic (SADR) was proclaimed by Polisario on 28 February 1976, and Libya began to recognize the SADR as the legitimate government of Western Sahara starting 15 April 1980. It is still common for Sahrawi students to attend their schooling in Libya.

Gaddafi also aided Jean-Bédel Bokassa, the self-proclaimed Emperor of the short-lived Central African Empire, until the latter struck an agreement with French president Valéry Giscard d'Estaing by which the French would fund his coronation in exchange for severing ties with Gaddafi.

U.S. embassy staff members were withdrawn from Tripoli after a mob attacked and set fire to the embassy in December 1979. The U.S. government declared Libya a "state sponsor of terrorism" on 29 December 1979.

=== 1980s ===
In May 1981, the U.S. government closed the Libyan "people's bureau" (embassy) in Washington, D.C. and expelled the Libyan staff in response to their conduct generally violating internationally accepted standards of diplomatic behavior.

In August 1981, in the first incident of the Gulf of Sidra, two Libyan jets fired on U.S. aircraft participating in a routine naval exercise over international waters of the Mediterranean Sea claimed by Libya. The U.S. planes returned fire and shot down the attacking Libyan aircraft. On 11 December 1981, the State Department invalidated U.S. passports for travel to Libya (a de facto travel ban) and, for purposes of safety, advised all U.S. citizens in Libya to leave. In March 1982, the U.S. government prohibited imports of Libyan crude oil into the United States and expanded the controls on U.S.-origin goods intended for export to Libya. Licenses were required for all transactions, except food and medicine. In March 1984, U.S. export controls were expanded to prohibit future exports to the Ra's Lanuf petrochemical complex. In April 1985, all Export-Import Bank financing was prohibited.

In October 1981, Egyptian President Anwar Sadat was assassinated. Gaddafi applauded the murder and remarked that it was a "punishment" for Sadat's signing of the Camp David Accords with the United States and Israel.

In 1982, Libya provided $100 million in arms to Argentina during the Falklands War.

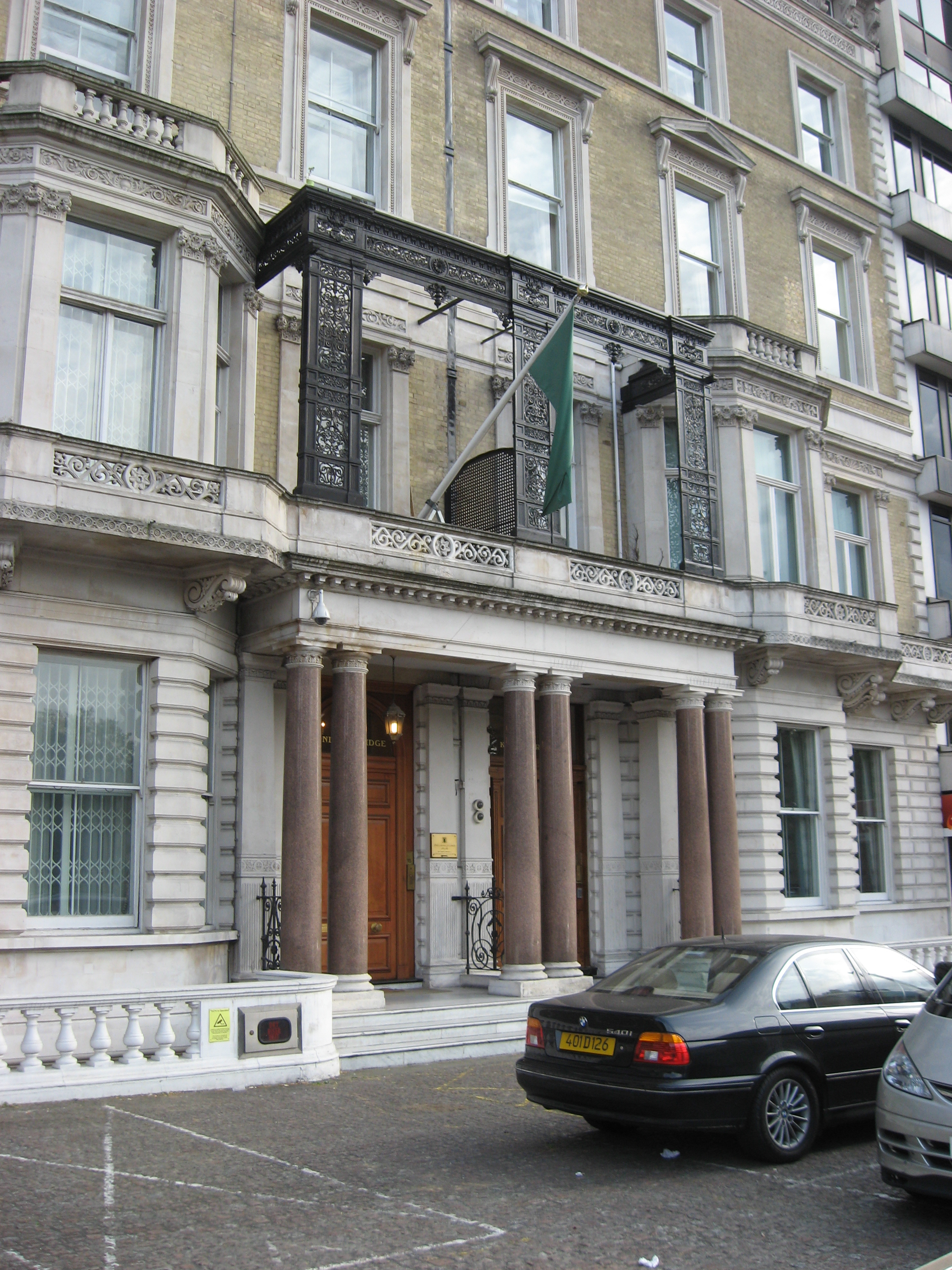
Libyan People's Bureau (Embassy) in London, Knightsbridge, 2008

During the 1980s, Libya provided financial support for the National Front in the United Kingdom, and paid for neo-Nazis and neo-fascists from France, the Netherlands and other countries to visit Libya.

In April 1984, Libyan refugees in London protested against the execution of two dissidents. Libyan diplomats shot at 11 people and killed Yvonne Fletcher, a British policewoman. The incident led to the breaking off of diplomatic relations between the United Kingdom and Libya for over a decade. Two months later, Gaddafi asserted that he wanted his agents to assassinate dissident refugees, even if they were just on pilgrimage in the holy city of Mecca—in August 1984, a Libyan plot in Mecca was thwarted by Saudi Arabian police.

After the December 1985 Rome and Vienna airport attacks, which killed 19 and wounded around 140, Gaddafi indicated that he would continue to support the Red Army Faction, the Red Brigades, and the Irish Republican Army as long as European countries support anti-Gaddafi Libyans. The Foreign Minister of Libya also called the massacres "heroic acts".

In 1986 Libyan state television announced that Libya was training suicide squads to attack American and European interests.

Gaddafi claimed the Gulf of Sidra as his territorial water and his navy was involved in a conflict from January to March 1986.

On 5 April 1986, Libyan agents bombed "La Belle" nightclub in West Berlin, killing three people and injuring 229 people who were spending the evening there. Gaddafi's plan was intercepted by Western intelligence. More detailed information was retrieved years later when Stasi archives were investigated by the reunited Germany. Libyan agents who had carried out the operation from the Libyan embassy in East Germany were prosecuted by reunited Germany in the 1990s.

Germany and the United States learned that the bombing in West Berlin had been ordered from Tripoli. On 14 April 1986, the United States carried out Operation El Dorado Canyon against Gaddafi and members of his regime. Air defenses, three army bases, and two airfields in Tripoli and Benghazi were bombed. The surgical strikes failed to kill Gaddafi but he lost a few dozen military officers. There were around 30 military deaths, and around 15 civilian deaths, including Gaddafi's 6-month-old adopted daughter, allegedly.

Gaddafi announced that he had won a spectacular military victory over the United States and the country was officially renamed the "Great Socialist People's Libyan Arab Jamahiriyah". However, his speech appeared devoid of passion and even the "victory" celebrations appeared unusual. Criticism of Gaddafi by ordinary Libyan citizens became more bold, such as defacing of Gaddafi posters. The raids against Gaddafi had brought the regime to its weakest point in 17 years.

The Chadian–Libyan conflict (1978–1987) ended in disaster for Libya in 1987 with the Toyota War. France supported Chad in this conflict and two years later on 19 September 1989, a French airliner, UTA Flight 772, was destroyed by an in-flight explosion for which Libyan agents were convicted in absentia. The incident bore close similarities to the destruction of Pan Am Flight 103 (the Lockerbie Bombing) a year earlier. The downing of these two airliners along with the 1986 Berlin discotheque bombing seemed to establish a pattern of reprisal attacks—in the form of terrorist bombings—by Libya or at least Libyan agents. The United Nations imposed sanctions on Libya for these two acts (with UN Security Council Resolutions 731, 748 and 883). The UN eventually lifted these sanctions (with Resolution 1506) in 2003 when Libya "accepted responsibility for the actions of its officials, renounced terrorism and arranged for payment of appropriate compensation for the families of the victims." In 2008 Libya established a fund to compensate victims of these three terrorist acts (and the 1986 US bombing of Tripoli and Benghazi).

Gaddafi fueled a number of Islamist and communist terrorist groups in the Philippines, as well as paramilitaries in Oceania. He attempted to radicalize New Zealand's Māori people in a failed effort to destabilise the U.S. ally. In Australia, he financed trade unions and some politicians who opposed the ANZUS alliance with the United States. In May 1987, Australia deported diplomats and broke off relations with Libya because of its activities in Oceania.

In late 1987 French authorities stopped a merchant vessel, the MV Eksund, which was delivering a 150-ton Libyan arms shipment to European terrorist groups.

In 1988, Libya was found to be in the process of constructing a chemical weapons plant at Rabta; former CIA Director Webster has called the Libyan facility "the largest chemical plant that I know for chemical warfare."

Libya's relationship with the Soviet Union involved massive Libyan arms purchases from the Soviet bloc and the presence of thousands of east bloc advisers. Libya's use—and heavy loss—of Soviet-supplied weaponry in its war with Chad was a notable breach of an apparent Soviet-Libyan understanding not to use the weapons for activities inconsistent with Soviet objectives. As a result, Soviet-Libyan relations reached a nadir in mid-1987.

In January 1989, there was another encounter over the Gulf of Sidra between U.S. and Libyan aircraft which resulted in the downing of two Libyan jets.

=== 1990s ===
In 1991, two Libyan intelligence agents were indicted by prosecutors in the United States and United Kingdom for their involvement in the December 1988 bombing of Pan Am Flight 103. Six other Libyans were put on trial in absentia for the 1989 bombing of UTA Flight 772 over Chad and Niger. The UN Security Council demanded that Libya surrender the suspects, cooperate with the Pan Am 103 and UTA 772 investigations, pay compensation to the victims' families, and cease all support for terrorism. Libya's refusal to comply led to the approval of Security Council Resolution 748 on 31 March 1992, imposing international sanctions on the state designed to bring about Libyan compliance. Continued Libyan defiance led to further sanctions by the UN against Libya in November 1993.

After the dissolution of the Warsaw Pact and the Soviet Union, Libya concentrated on expanding diplomatic ties with Third World countries and increasing its commercial links with Europe and East Asia. Following the imposition of U.N. sanctions in 1992, these ties significantly diminished. Following a 1998 Arab League meeting in which fellow Arab states decided not to challenge U.N. sanctions, Gaddafi announced that he was turning his back on pan-Arab ideas, one of the fundamental tenets of his philosophy.

Instead, Libya pursued closer bilateral ties, particularly with Egypt and Northwest African nations Tunisia and Morocco. It also has sought to develop its relations with Sub-Saharan Africa, leading to Libyan involvement in several internal African disputes in the Democratic Republic of Congo, Sudan, Somalia, Central African Republic, Eritrea, and Ethiopia. Libya also has sought to expand its influence in Africa through financial assistance, ranging from aid donations to impoverished neighbors such as Niger to oil subsidies to Zimbabwe. Gaddafi has proposed a borderless "United States of Africa" to transform the continent into a single nation-state ruled by a single government. This plan has been moderately well received, although more powerful would-be participants such as Nigeria and South Africa are skeptical.

Gaddafi also trained and supported Charles Taylor, who was indicted by the Special Court for Sierra Leone for war crimes and crimes against humanity committed during the conflict in Sierra Leone.

Libya had close ties with Slobodan Milošević's regime in FR Yugoslavia. Gaddafi aligned himself with the Orthodox Serbs against Bosnia and Herzegovina's Muslims and Kosovo's Albanians. Gaddafi supported Milošević even when Milošević was charged with large-scale ethnic cleansing against Albanians in Kosovo. In 2011, former Bulgarian Foreign Minister Nadezhda Neynsky revealed in a TV documentary that the Bulgarian government had turned over to Germany an unverified report compiled by its military agency which "made clear" the existence of the plan (Operation Horseshoe), even though the military intelligence warned that the information could not be verified.

Gaddafi continued the denunciation of the NATO bombing of the former Yugoslavia. Intimating that the allegations against the state were deliberate efforts by the "imperialist axis" to falsely image armed ARBiH death squads in Srebrenica and elsewhere.

In 1996, the Iran and Libya Sanctions Act (ILSA) was enacted, seeking to penalize non-U.S. companies which invest more than $40 million in Libya's oil and gasoline sector in any one year. ILSA was renewed in 2001, and the investment cap lowered to $20 million.

In 1999, less than a decade after the UN sanctions were put in place, Libya began to make dramatic policy changes in regard to the Western world, including turning over the Lockerbie suspects for trial. This diplomatic breakthrough followed years of negotiation, including a visit by UN Secretary General Kofi Annan to Libya in December 1998, and personal appeals by Nelson Mandela. Eventually UK Foreign Secretary Robin Cook persuaded the Americans to accept a trial of the suspects in the Netherlands under Scottish law, with the UN Security Council agreeing to suspend sanctions as soon as the suspects arrived in the Netherlands for trial. Libya also paid compensation in 1999 for the death of British policewoman Yvonne Fletcher, a move that preceded the reopening of the British embassy in Tripoli and the appointment of ambassador Sir Richard Dalton, after a 17-year break in diplomatic relations.

=== 2000s ===
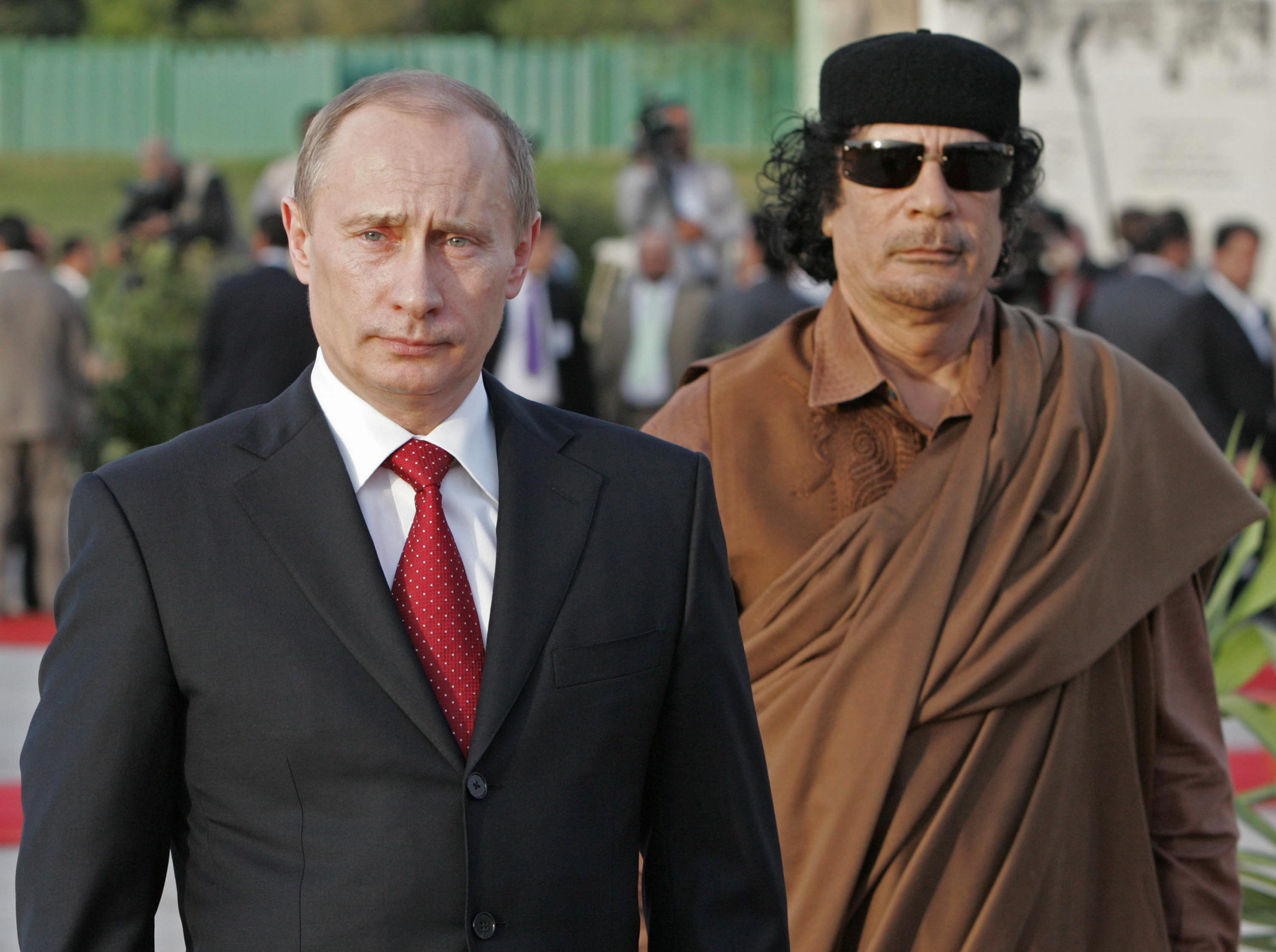
Gaddafi with then-President of Russia Vladimir Putin in 2008

As of January 2002, Libya was constructing another chemical weapons production facility at Tarhuna. Citing Libya's support for terrorism and its past regional aggressions the United States voiced concern over this development. In cooperation with like-minded countries, the United States has since sought to bring a halt to the foreign technical assistance deemed essential to the completion of this facility. See Chemical weapon proliferation#Libya.

Following the fall of Saddam Hussein's regime in the 2003 invasion of Iraq, Gaddafi decided to abandon his weapons of mass destruction programs and pay almost 3 billion euros in compensation to the families of Pan Am Flight 103 and UTA Flight 772. The decision was welcomed by many western nations and was seen as an important step toward Libya rejoining the international community. Since 2003 the country has made efforts to normalize its ties with the European Union and the United States and has even coined the catchphrase, 'The Libya Model', an example intended to show the world what can be achieved through negotiation, rather than force, when there is goodwill on both sides. By 2004 George W. Bush had lifted the economic sanctions and official relations resumed with the United States. Libya opened a liaison office in Washington, and the United States opened an office in Tripoli. In January 2004, Congressman Tom Lantos led the first official Congressional delegation visit to Libya.

Libya has supported Sudan's President Omar al-Bashir despite charges of a genocide in Darfur.

The release, in 2007, of five Bulgarian nurses and a Palestinian doctor, who had been held since 1999, charged with conspiring to deliberately infect over 400 children with HIV, was seen as marking a new stage in Libyan-Western relations.

The United States removed Gaddafi's regime, after 27 years, from its list of states sponsoring terrorism.

On 16 October 2007, Libya was elected to serve on the United Nations Security Council for two years starting in January 2008.

In August 2008 Italian Prime Minister Silvio Berlusconi signed an agreement to pay Libya $5 billion over 25 years – this was a "complete and moral acknowledgement of the damage inflicted on Libya by Italy during the colonial era", the Italian prime minister said. In September 2008, US Secretary of State Condoleezza Rice met with Gaddafi and announced that US-Libya relations have entered a 'new phase'.

Libyan-Swiss relations strongly suffered after the arrest of Hannibal Gaddafi for beating up his domestic servants in Geneva in 2008. In response, Gaddafi removed all his money held in Swiss banks and asked the United Nations to vote to abolish Switzerland as a sovereign nation.

In February 2009, Gaddafi was selected to be chairman of the African Union for one year. The same year, the United Kingdom and Libya signed a prisoner-exchange agreement and then Libya requested the transfer of the convicted Lockerbie bomber, who finally returned home in August 2009.

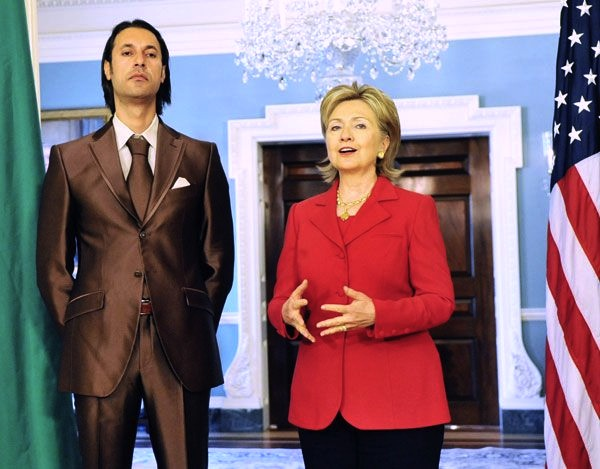
U.S. Secretary of State Hillary Clinton with Libyan National Security Adviser Mutassim Gaddafi in 2009

On 23 September 2009, Colonel Gaddafi addressed the 64th session of the UN General Assembly in New York, his first visit to the United States.

As of 25 October 2009, Canadian visa requests were being denied and Canadian travelers were told they were not welcome in Libya. Specifically, Harper's government was planning to publicly criticize Gaddafi for praising the convicted Lockerbie bomber.

The sincerity of the good faith efforts of the Libyan government may be questionable since Moroccan Foreign Minister Taieb Fassi Fihri, told a U.S. diplomat in 2009 that the Libyans were willing to host wounded Guinean junta leader Captain Moussa Dadis Camara after a failed assassination attempt in 2009. Libya also still provided bounties for heads of refugees who criticized Gaddafi, including 1 million dollars for Ashur Shamis, a Libyan-British journalist.

Despite this brief rapprochement with the West, Libya and Gaddafi retained their anti-imperialist stances. In 2009, Gaddafi, along with Venezuelan president Hugo Chávez, signed a declaration rejecting "intentions to link the legitimate struggle of the people for liberty and self-determination with terrorism." At the meeting, Gaddafi suggested a "South Atlantic Treaty Organization", an anti-imperialist alternative to NATO for the Third World.

Gaddafi and Libya always retained its staunch anti-Zionist stance. Throughout the 2000s, Gaddafi and Libya provided support to Palestinian group Hamas, and developed a close relationship with its leader, Khaled Mashal. During the Gaza War (2008–2009), Libya was the first country to send a shipment of aid to Gaza, Gaddafi also called for Arab volunteers to be sent to Gaza.

Whilst it was presented that Gaddafi had "renounced terrorism", he maintained contact and support for many insurgent groups, namely, the FARC and the ELN in Colombia, the Kurdistan Workers' Party and the Kurdistan National Congress, as well as the Free Papua Movement. Gaddafi also maintained strong links with groups that had previously received support from Libya as armed groups, but had since laid down arms, such as the African National Congress in South Africa, the URNG in Guatemala, SWAPO in Namibia, the Sandinistas in Nicaragua, and the Communist Party of Chile, whose erstwhile paramilitary wing, the Manuel Rodríguez Patriotic Front, received support from Libya.

Gaddafi strongly supported and forged close ties with pink tide-era Latin American socialist leaders, such as Hugo Chávez in Venezuela, Daniel Ortega in Nicaragua, Evo Morales in Bolivia, José Mujica in Uruguay and Rafael Correa in Ecuador.

=== 2010s ===
During the start of the Arab Spring, Gaddafi condemned the Tunisian revolution in January 2011, saying protesters were misled by WikiLeaks and voicing solidarity with ousted President Zine El Abidine Ben Ali.

The progress made by Gaddafi's government in improving relations with the Western world was swiftly set back by the regime's authoritarian crackdown on protests that began the following month. Many Western countries, including the United Kingdom, the United States, and eventually Italy condemned Libya for the brutal crackdown on the dissidents. Peru became the first of several countries to sever diplomatic relations with Tripoli on 22 February 2011, followed closely by African Union member state Botswana the following day.

Libya was suspended from Arab League proceedings on 22 February 2011, the same day Peru terminated bilateral relations. In response, Gaddafi declared that in the view of his government, "The Arab League is finished. There is no such thing as the Arab League."

On 10 March 2011, France became the first country to not just break off relations with the jamahiriya, but transfer diplomatic recognition to the rebel National Transitional Council established in Benghazi, declaring it to be "the sole legitimate representative of the Libyan people". As of 20 September 2011, a total of 98 countries had taken this step.

On 19 March 2011, a coalition of United Nations member states led by France, the United Kingdom, and the United States began military operations in Libyan airspace and territorial waters after the United Nations Security Council approved UNSCR 1973, ostensibly to prevent further attacks on civilians as loyalist forces closed in on Benghazi, the rebel headquarters. In response, Gaddafi declared that a state of "war with no limits" existed between Libya and the members of the coalition. Despite this, he sent a three-page letter to US President Barack Obama imploring him to "annul a wrong and mistaken action" and stop striking Libyan targets, repeatedly referring to him as "our son" and blaming the uprising on the terrorist group al-Qaeda.

== Relations with the West ==
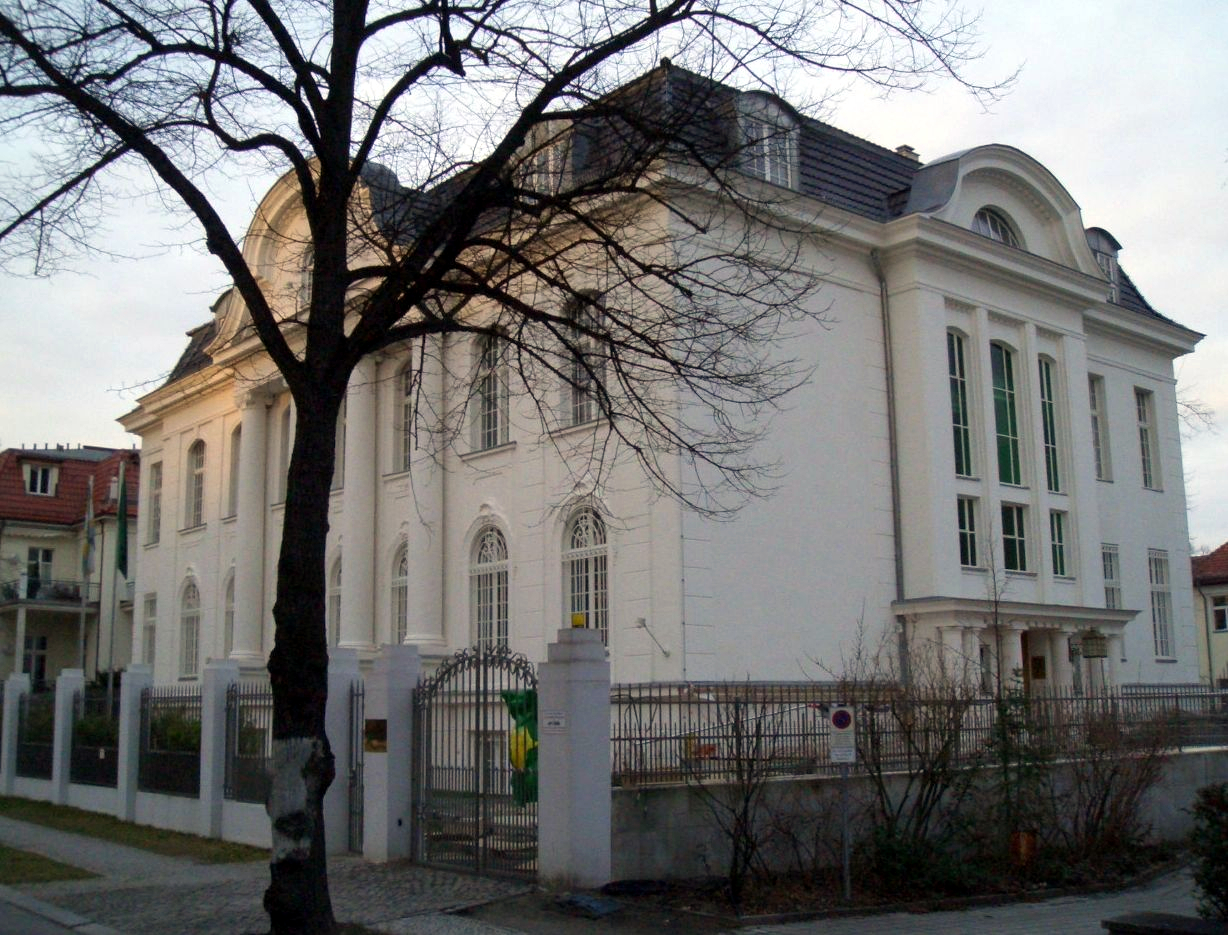
Embassy in Berlin

In 2003 Libya began to make policy changes with the open intention of pursuing a Western-Libyan détente. The Libyan government announced its decision to abandon its weapons of mass destruction programs and pay almost $3 billion in compensation to the families of Pan Am Flight 103 and UTA Flight 772.

Starting in 2003, the Libyan government restored normal diplomatic ties with the European Union and the United States and has even coined the catchphrase, "The Libya Model", an example intended to show the world what can be achieved through negotiation rather than force when there is goodwill on both sides.

On 30 August 2008, Gaddafi and Italian Prime Minister Silvio Berlusconi signed a historic cooperation treaty in Benghazi. Under its terms, Italy will pay $5 billion to Libya as compensation for its former military occupation. In exchange, Libya will take measures to combat illegal immigration coming from its shores and boost investments in Italian companies. The treaty was ratified by Italy on 6 February 2009, and by Libya on 2 March, during a visit to Tripoli by Berlusconi.

On 31 October 2008, Libya paid $1.5 billion, sought through donations from private businesses, to a fund that would be used to compensate both US victims of the 1988 bombing of Pan Am flight 103 and the 1986 bombing of the La Belle disco in Germany. In addition, Libyan victims of US airstrikes that followed the Berlin attack will also be compensated with $300 million from the fund. US state department spokesman, Sean McCormack called the move a "laudable milestone ... clearing the way for continued and expanding US-Libyan partnership." This final payment under the US-Libya Claims Settlement Agreement was seen as a major step towards improving ties between the two, which had begun easing after Tripoli halted its arms programmes. George Bush also signed an executive order restoring Libya's immunity from terror-related lawsuits and dismissing pending compensation cases.

On 17 November 2008, FCO minister Bill Rammell signed five agreements with Libya. Rammell said: "I will today sign four bilateral agreements with my Libyan counterpart, Abdulatti al-Obidi, which will strengthen our judicial ties, as agreed during Tony Blair's visit to Libya in May last year. In addition, we are signing today a Double Taxation Convention which will bring benefits to British business in Libya and Libyan investors in the UK – benefits in terms of certainty, clarity and transparency and reducing tax compliance burdens. We are also in the final stages of negotiating an agreement to protect and promote investment."

"UK/Libya relations have significantly improved in recent years, following Libya's voluntary renunciation of WMD. Today we are partners in the UN Security Council. We also wish to assist Libya to establish closer relations with the European Union to continue and strengthen the reintegration of Libya within the international community. We therefore support the commencement of negotiations between Libya and the EU on a framework agreement which should cover a range of issues including political, social, economic, commercial and cultural relations between the EU and Libya."

On 21 November 2008, the US Senate confirmed the appointment of Gene Cretz to be the first US ambassador to Libya since 1972.

In June 2009, Gaddafi made his first visit to Rome, where he met Prime Minister Berlusconi, President Giorgio Napolitano, Senate President Renato Schifani, and Chamber President Gianfranco Fini, among others. The Democratic Party and Italy of Values opposed the visit, and many protests were staged throughout Italy by human rights organizations and the Radical Party. Gaddafi also took part in the G8 summit in L'Aquila in July as Chairman of the African Union.

In the 2005–2009 period, Italy has been the first EU arms exporter towards Libya, with a total value of €276.7m, of which one third only in the last 2008–2009 years. Italian exports cover one third of total EU arms exports towards Libya, and include mainly military aircraft but also missiles and electronic equipment.

In the late 2000s, Libyan-US relations soured due to the establishment of the United States Africa Command (AFRICOM), of which Gaddafi and the Libyan government were highly critical.

During the Libyan Civil War, Italy terminated relations with Tripoli and recognized the rebel authority in Benghazi as Libya's legitimate representative, effectively starting relations with the anti-Gaddafi government. The Italian government has urged the international community to follow suit.

During the Libyan Civil War, all European Union and NATO member states withdrew diplomatic staff from Tripoli and shut their embassies in the Libyan capital. Several foreign embassies and UN offices were badly damaged by vandals on 1 May 2011, drawing condemnation from the United Kingdom and Italy. The UK also expelled the Libyan ambassador in London from the country.

On 1 July 2011, Gaddafi threatened to sponsor attacks against civilians and businesses in Europe in what would be a resumption of his policies of the 1970s and 1980s.

== International incidents ==
=== 1986 West Berlin discotheque bombing ===
On 13 November 2001, a German court found four persons, including a former employee of the Libyan embassy in East Berlin, guilty in connection with the 1986 Berlin discotheque bombing, in which 229 people were injured and two U.S. servicemen were killed. The court also established a connection to the Libyan government.

=== Lockerbie bombing ===
In November 1991, two Libyan intelligence agents, Abdelbaset al-Megrahi and Lamin Khalifah Fhimah, were charged with the December 1988 Lockerbie bombing. Libya refused to extradite the two accused to the U.S. or to Scotland. As a result, United Nations Security Council Resolution 748 was approved on 31 March 1992, requiring Libya to surrender the suspects, cooperate with the Pan Am Flight 103 and UTA Flight 772 investigations, pay compensation to the victims' families, and cease all support for terrorism. The UN imposed further sanctions with Resolution 883, a limited assets freeze and an embargo on selected oil equipment, in November 1993. In 1999, six other Libyans who had been accused of the September 1989 bombing of UTA Flight 772 were put on trial in their absence by a Paris court. They were found guilty and sentenced to life imprisonment.

The Libyan government eventually surrendered the two Lockerbie bombing suspects in 1999 for trial at the Scottish Court in the Netherlands and UN sanctions were suspended. On 31 January 2001, at the end of the Pan Am Flight 103 bombing trial, Megrahi was convicted of murder and sentenced to 27 years in prison. Fhimah was found not guilty and was freed to return to Libya. Megrahi appealed against his conviction but this was rejected in February 2002. In 2003, Libya wrote to the UN Security Council admitting "responsibility for the actions of its officials" in relation to the Lockerbie bombing, renouncing terrorism and agreeing to pay compensation to the relatives of the 270 victims. The previously suspended UN sanctions were then cancelled.

In June 2007, the Scottish Criminal Cases Review Commission decided that there may have been a miscarriage of justice and referred Megrahi's case back to Court of Criminal Appeal in Edinburgh for a second appeal. Expected to last for a year, the appeal began in April 2009 and was adjourned in May 2009. Having been diagnosed with terminal cancer, Megrahi dropped the appeal and on 20 August 2009, was granted compassionate release from jail and repatriated to Libya. In an interview with The Wall Street Journal on 24 September 2009, the day after his address to the United Nations General Assembly in New York City, Gaddafi said, "As a case, the Lockerbie question: I would say it's come to an end, legally, politically, financially, it is all over."

=== Benghazi hospital affair ===
In the late 1990s, a Benghazi children's hospital was the site of an outbreak of HIV infection that spread to over 400 patients. Libya blamed the outbreak on five Bulgarian nurses and a Palestinian doctor, who were arrested and eventually sentenced to death (eventually overturned and a new trial ordered). The international view is that Libya has used the medics as scapegoats for poor hygiene conditions, and Bulgaria and other countries including the European Union and the United States repeatedly called on Tripoli to release them. A new trial began 11 May 2006, in Tripoli. On 6 December a study was released showing that some children had been infected before the six arrived in Libya, but it was too late for inclusion as evidence. On 19 December 2006, the six were again convicted and sentenced to death. They were finally released in June 2007, after mediation of French president Nicolas Sarkozy, in exchange for a variety of agreements with the EU, and they were returned to Bulgaria safely.

=== Dispute with Switzerland ===
On 15 July 2008 the fifth eldest son of Muammar Gaddafi, Hannibal Gaddafi, and his wife were held for two days and charged with assaulting two of their staff in Geneva, Switzerland and then released on bail on 17 July. Hannibal Gaddafi has a history of violent and aggressive behaviour having been charged with battery by his later wife and having attacked Italian police officers.

The government of Libya subsequently put a boycott on Swiss imports, reduced flights between Libya and Switzerland, stopped issuing visas to Swiss citizens, recalled diplomats from Bern, and forced all Swiss companies such as ABB and Nestlé to close offices. General National Maritime Transport Company, which owns a large refinery in Switzerland, also halted oil shipments to Switzerland.

Two Swiss businessmen, Rachid Hamdani and Max Göldi, Libya head of ABB, who were in Libya at the time were denied permission to leave the country and were forced to take shelter at the Swiss embassy in Tripoli. Both were initially sentenced to 6 months in prison for immigration offenses, but Hamdani was cleared on appeal and Göldi's sentence was reduced to four months. Göldi surrendered to Libyan authorities on 22 February 2010, while Hamdani returned to Switzerland on 24 February.

At the 35th G8 summit in July 2009, Muammar Gaddafi called Switzerland a "world mafia" and called for the country to be split between France, Germany and Italy.

In August 2009 Swiss President Hans-Rudolf Merz visited Tripoli and issued a public apology to Libya for the arrest of Hannibal Gaddafi and his wife. Geneva's prosecutor dropped the case against the Gaddafis when the employees withdrew their formal complaint after reaching an undisclosed settlement.

=== Schengen Area visa ban ===
In February 2010, the dispute with Switzerland spread, with Libya refusing to issue entry visas to nationals of any of the countries within the Schengen Area, of which Switzerland is a part. This action was apparently taken in retaliation for Switzerland blacklisting 188 high-ranking officials from Libya.

As a result of the ban, foreign nationals from certain countries were not permitted entry into Libya at Tripoli airport, including 22 Italians and eight Maltese citizens, one of whom was forced to wait for 20 hours before he was able to return home. Three Italians, nine Portuguese nationals, a Frenchman and a European citizen who arrived from Cairo were repatriated. In addition to citizens of Schengen Area countries being refused entry, it has been reported that several Irish citizens have been turned away, despite Ireland not being a member of the Schengen agreement. An unnamed Libyan official at the airport asked to confirm the ban told Reuters: "This is right. This decision has been taken. No visas for Europeans, except Britain."

In response, the European Commission criticised the actions, describing them as "unilateral and disproportionate", although no immediate 'tit-for-tat' response was announced.

== Support for rebel and paramilitary groups ==
The government of Libya had in the past received criticism and trade restrictions from Western countries and organisations for allegedly providing several armed rebel groups with weapons, explosives and combat training.

Paramilitaries supported by Libya past and present include:

- The Provisional Irish Republican Army (IRA) of Ireland, an Irish paramilitary group that fought a 29-year war for a United Ireland. See Provisional IRA arms importation for details. Many of the break away Irish Republican groups which oppose the Good Friday Agreement (the Continuity Irish Republican Army and the Real Irish Republican Army) are believed to be in possession of a significant amount of the Libyan ammunition and semtex explosives delivered to the IRA during the 1970s and 1980s.
- ETA (Basque Homeland and Freedom), A Basque armed revolutionary organization involved in a decades-long conflict for an independent and socialist Basque Country. During the 1970s and 1980s, the group received military training, financial aid, and safe haven in Libya.
- The Free Aceh Movement or GAM, an Indonesian separatist rebel group was funded by Libya in its second wave beginning in 1989. The Libyan government also supplied troops and training to the rebels.
- The Palestine Liberation Organization of the disputed territories in the West Bank and Gaza Strip received support from Libya, as well as many other Arab states.
- The Sandinista National Liberation Front is a Christian socialist, and formerly Marxist-Leninist group that fought in the Nicaraguan Revolution and remains Nicaragua's ruling party. They received support from Gaddafi during the Revolution.
- The National Patriotic Front of Liberia (NPFL), the Liberian rebel group led by Charles Taylor received direct Libyan support, including political support, weapons, sponsorship and military training.
- The Revolutionary United Front (RUF), a former Sierra Leonean guerrilla group turned party led by Foday Sankoh, received the same political, financial, and military support and patronage as the NPFL.
- Action Directe was a French libertarian socialist urban guerrilla group active from 1979 until 1987. They received considerable support from Gaddafi.
- Tajammu al-Arabi, was a Libyan-supported military-political organization that fought against the Furs in the War of the Tribes.
- The Moro National Liberation Front was an Islamist rebel army which fought in the Philippines against the military dictatorship of Ferdinand Marcos
- Umkhonto we Sizwe – Xhosa, for the "spear of the nation" was originally the military wing of the African National Congress (a multiracial, center-left political party) which fought against the white minority led Apartheid regime in South Africa. During the years of MK's underground struggle the group was supported by Libya.
- The Communist Party of the Philippines, the New People's Army and the National Democratic Front of the Philippines have been engaged in an armed struggle against the Filipino government. The CPP, NPA and NDF received financial support and training from Libya.
- Libya was also one of the main supporters of the Polisario Front in the former Spanish Sahara – a nationalist group dedicated to ending Spanish colonialism in the region, and from 1975, to combatting the Moroccan occupation of what is now known as Western Sahara. The Sahrawi Arab Democratic Republic (SADR) was proclaimed by Polisario on 28 February 1976, and Libya began to recognize the SADR as the legitimate government of Western Sahara. While monetary and military Libyan support for the Sahrawi cause dwindled in the mid-1980s, Sahrawi refugees and students were still able to settle in and apply for free higher education in Libya.
- The Tupamaros were a Uruguayan Guevarist urban guerrilla group active in the 1960s and 1970s. One member, José Mujica, would later serve as President of Uruguay. They were supported by Gaddafi.
- The Black Panther Party were an African-American revolutionary socialist organization founded by Bobby Seale and Huey P. Newton active from 1966 until 1982. They received support from Gaddafi.
- The Shining Path, a Marxist-Leninist-Maoist insurgent group in Peru founded and led by Abimael Guzmán in 1980. During its war against the Peruvian government, it was supported by Libya.
- The Houthi movement, a Shia militia group in Yemen founded by Hussein al-Houthi in 1994. They received support from Libya.

== Africa ==
Libya has in the past claimed a strip along their border of about 19,400 square kilometres (7,500 sq mi) in northern Niger and part of southeastern Algeria. In addition, it is involved in a maritime boundary dispute with Tunisia.

As with all other African countries, Libya is a member of the Non-Aligned Movement. As with most international organizations to which Tripoli is a party, NAM recognizes it under the name Libyan Arab Jamahiriya.

=== Algeria ===
Algeria–Libya relations have generally been friendly. Libyan support for the Polisario Front in the Western Sahara facilitated early post independence Algerian relations with Libya. Libyan inclinations for full-scale political union, however, have obstructed formal political collaboration because Algeria has consistently backed away from such cooperation with its unpredictable neighbour.

=== Chad ===
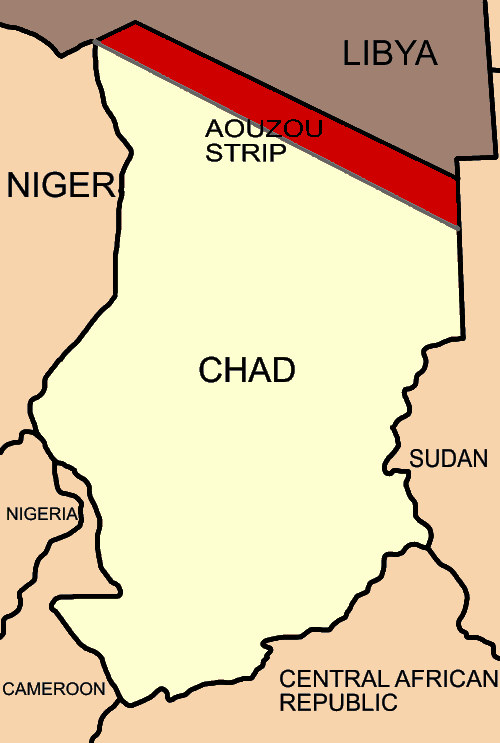
Aouzou strip (red)

Libya long claimed the Aouzou Strip, a strip of land in northern Chad rich with uranium deposits that was intensely involved in Chad's civil war in the 1970s and 1980s.

In 1973, Libya engaged in military operations in the Aouzou Strip to gain access to minerals and to use it as a base of influence in Chadian politics. Libya argued that the territory was inhabited by indigenous people who owed allegiance to the Senussi Order and subsequently to the Ottoman Empire, and that this title had been inherited by Libya. It also supported its claim with an unratified 1935 treaty between France and Italy, the colonial powers of Chad and Libya, respectively. After consolidating its hold on the strip, Libya annexed it in 1976. Chadian forces were able to force the Libyans to retreat from the Aouzou Strip in 1987.

A cease-fire between Chad and Libya held from 1987 to 1988, followed by unsuccessful negotiations over the next several years, leading finally to the 1994 International Court of Justice decision granting Chad sovereignty over the Aouzou Strip, which ended Libyan occupation.

Chadian-Libyan relations were ameliorated when Libyan-supported Idriss Déby unseated Habré on 2 December. Gaddafi was the first head of state to recognize the new regime, and he also signed treaties of friendship and cooperation on various levels; but regarding the Aouzou Strip Déby followed his predecessor, declaring that if necessary he would fight to keep the strip out of Libya's hands.

The Aouzou dispute was concluded for good on 3 February 1994, when the judges of the ICJ by a majority of 16 to 1 decided that the Aouzou Strip belonged to Chad. The court's judgement was implemented without delay, the two parties signing as early as 4 April an agreement concerning the practical modalities for the implementation of the judgement. Monitored by international observers, the withdrawal of Libyan troops from the Strip began on 15 April and was completed by 10 May. The formal and final transfer of the Strip from Libya to Chad took place on 30 May, when the sides signed a joint declaration stating that the Libyan withdrawal had been effected.

During the Libyan Civil War, after meeting with high-level representatives of the Chadian government, United States Secretary of State Hillary Clinton announced that N'Djamena opposes Gaddafi and has reached out to the rival National Transitional Council in rebel-held Benghazi. This claim was disputed by at least one foreign policy analyst, who brought up previous remarks made by Ambassador Daoussa Déby, the Chadian president's half-brother, and said, "Déby's words seem to echo Gaddafi's claims that the terrorist group al-Qaeda masterminded the national uprising in Libya."

=== Egypt ===
After the neighboring countries of Egypt and Libya both gained independence in the early 1950s, relations were initially cooperative. Libya assisted Egypt in the 1973 Yom Kippur War. Later, tensions arose due to Egypt's rapprochement with the west. Following the 1977 Libyan–Egyptian War, relations were suspended for twelve years. However, since 1989 relations have steadily improved. With the progressive lifting of UN and US sanctions from 2003 to 2008, the two countries have been working together to jointly develop their oil and natural gas industries.

== Europe ==
Country	Formal Relations Began	Notes
Belarus	1992	See Belarus–Libya relations: Belarus has an embassy in Tripoli.; Libya has an embassy in Minsk.; Since the Lockerbie bombing, Belarus has been one of the few European nations to maintain diplomatic relations with Libya.
Bulgaria		See Foreign relations of Bulgaria Relations with Bulgaria have been troublesome after the a group of Bulgarian nurses and a Palestinian doctor were accused of infecting Libyan children with HIV when they worked at a Libyan hospital; the nurses were sentenced to death in a Libyan court, but the death sentences were ultimately commuted and the Bulgarian nurses and Palestinian doctor were sent back to Bulgaria.
Croatia		See Croatia–Libya relations
Cyprus	1960s	See Cyprus–Libya relations: Cyprus has a consulate (later an embassy) in Tripoli.; Libya has an embassy in Nicosia.; Cyprus Foreign Affairs: List of bilateral treaties with Libya
Czech Republic	1993	See Czech Republic – Libya relations: The Czech Republic has an embassy in Tripoli.; Libya has an embassy in Prague.; The Czech Republic imposed sanctions on Libya in 1997 under a United Nations resolution following the 1988 Lockerbie bombing. This was lifted in 2006 by Czech President Václav Klaus.
Denmark		See Denmark – Libya relations: Libya has an embassy in Copenhagen, Denmark.; Denmark has an embassy in Tripoli, Libya.
France		See France–Libya relations Libya developed particularly close relations with France after the June 1967 War, when France relaxed its arms embargo on nonfront-line Middle East combatants and agreed to sell weapons to the Libyans. In 1974 Libya and France signed an agreement whereby Libya exchanged a guaranteed oil supply for technical assistance and financial cooperation. By 1976, however, Libya began criticizing France as an "arms merchant" because of its willingness to sell weapons to both sides in the Middle East conflict. Libya later criticized France for its willingness to sell arms to Egypt. Far more serious was Libya's dissatisfaction with French military intervention in the Western Sahara, Chad, and Zaire. In 1978 Gaddafi noted that although economic relations were good, political relations were not, and he accused France of having reverted to a colonialist policy that former French president Charles de Gaulle had earlier abandoned. In the 1980s, Libyan-French discord centered on the situation in Chad. As mentioned, the two countries found themselves supporting opposite sides in the Chadian Civil War. In late 1987, there were some French troops in Chad, but French policy did not permit its forces to cross the sixteenth parallel. Thus, direct clashes with Libyan soldiers seemed unlikely. On 10 March 2011, France was the first country in the world to recognise the National Transitional Council as the legitimate government of Libya, in the context of the Libyan Civil War against Muammar Gaddafi.
Germany		See Germany–Libya relations Germany is represented in Libya with an embassy in Tripoli, while Libya has an embassy in Berlin. The relationship between these countries was tense in the late 1980s following a bombing incident, but has improved since with increasingly close co-operation especially on economic matters. On 13 June 2011, Germany began to recognize the National Transitional Council as the sole legitimate government of Libya.
Greece		See Foreign relations of Greece
Hungary		Hungary has an embassy in Tripoli.; Libya has an embassy in Budapest.
Italy		See Foreign relations of Italy
Malta		See Libya–Malta relations: Both countries established diplomatic relations soon after Malta's independence.; Both countries had very close ties and cooperation during Dom Mintoff's governments.; Libya has an embassy in Valletta.; Malta has an embassy in Tripoli.
Russia		See Libya–Russia relations: Russia has an embassy in Tripoli.; Libya has an embassy in Moscow.
Serbia	1955	See Libya–Serbia relations: Libya has an embassy in Belgrade.; Since 1963, Serbia has an embassy in Tripoli.; Serbian Ministry of Foreign Affairs about relations with Libya
Turkey	1955	See Libya–Turkey relations: Libya has an embassy in Ankara, and a general consulate in Istanbul.; Turkey has an embassy in Tripoli and a general consulate in Benghazi.; Turkish Ministry of Foreign Affairs about relations with Libya
Switzerland		See Libya–Switzerland relations: Libya had an embassy in Bern; Switzerland had an embassy in Tripoli; Relations were severed in 2009, Gaddafi publicly called for the dissolution of Switzerland.
United Kingdom		See Libya – United Kingdom relations: Libya has an embassy in London; The United Kingdom had an embassy in Tripoli

== United States ==
In early 2004, the U.S. State Department ended its ban on U.S. citizens using their passports for travel to Libya or spending money there. U.S. citizens began legally heading back to Libya for the first time since 1981.

On 15 May 2006 David Welch, Assistant Secretary of State for Near Eastern Affairs, announced that the U.S. had decided, after a 45-day comment period, to renew full diplomatic relations with Libya and remove Libya from the U.S. list of countries that foster terrorism. During this announcement, it was also said that the U.S. has the intention of upgrading the U.S. liaison office in Tripoli into an embassy. The U.S. embassy in Tripoli opened in May, a product of gradual normalization of international relations after Libya accepted responsibility for the Pan Am 103 bombing. Libya's dismantling of its weapons of mass destruction was a major step towards this announcement.

The United States suspended its relations with Gaddafi's government indefinitely on 10 March 2011, when it announced it would begin treating the National Transitional Council in Benghazi as legitimate negotiating parties for the country's future.

On 15 July 2011, Secretary of State Hillary Clinton announced that America would now recognize the National Transitional Council as the legitimate government of Libya, thus severing any and all recognition of Gaddafi's government as legitimate.

== Asia and Oceania ==
=== China ===
Gaddafi was in many ways critical of China on international issues. He also said that China had betrayed socialism. Despite this, Chinese companies engaged in talks to sell weapons to the Libyan government during the First Libyan Civil War, however the Chinese government stated it was unaware of these negotiations, and that weapons were never sold.

=== Indonesia ===
Beginning in 1989, Libya supported the Free Aceh Movement through GAM's second wave with troops and aid.

=== Iraq ===
Libya supported Iran against Iraq during the Iran–Iraq War (1980–1988). For this reason, in 1985, Iraq broke all ties with Libya. However Libya ended support for Iran in 1987 and moved to reestablishing relations with Iraqi president Saddam Hussein. Libya opposed the Iraqi invasion of Kuwait but also opposed the multinational coalition against Iraq during the Gulf War. Gaddafi was a lifelong critic of the 2003 invasion of Iraq, sharply criticising the war and the execution of Saddam Hussein at a 2008 Arab League summit, and going so far as to suspend all relations with the post-Ba'athist authorities in 2003, until Iraq's "freedom, independence and sovereignty" was restored.

=== Kashmir ===
During his address to the United Nations General Assembly in September 2009, Gaddafi rejected that either India or Pakistan should control the disputed territory of Kashmir, but instead proposed the establishment of an independent Ba'athist state between the two nations, stating "Kashmir should be an independent state, not Indian, not Pakistani. We should end this conflict. It should be a Ba'athist state between India and Pakistan."

=== Vanuatu ===
Vanuatu and Libya established official diplomatic relations in 1986, at the initiative of the former. The aim, for Vanuatu, was to obtain access to favourable economic relations with a major oil-producing country, and to strengthen its policy of non-alignment by establishing relations with a notable country not aligned with the Western Bloc.

== International recognition ==
As of 18 October 2011, at least 100 UN member states have explicitly recognised the National Transitional Council, as have all international organisations to which Libya is a member. Only the 8 countries of the Bolivarian Alliance for the Americas and the African countries of Namibia and Zimbabwe have explicitly continued to denounce the NTC and insist on Gaddafi's legitimacy.

== See also ==
- List of diplomatic missions of Libya
- List of diplomatic missions in Libya
- Iran–Arab relations (Libya)
- Libya and weapons of mass destruction
- List of international trips made by Muammar Gaddafi
