= Libya–United States relations =

- Libya: United States

Diplomatic mission
- Embassy of Libya, Washington, D.C.: Embassy of the United States, Tripoli

Envoy
- Chargé d'affaires Khaled Daief: Chargé d'affaires Jeremy Berndt

Libya–United States relations are the bilateral relations between the State of Libya and the United States of America. Relations are today cordial and cooperative, with particularly strong security cooperation only after the 2012 attack on the US liaison office or mission in Benghazi. Furthermore, a Gallup poll conducted in March and April 2012 found that Libyans had "among the highest approval" of US leadership in the entire Middle East and North Africa region.

However, for decades prior to the 2011 Libyan Civil War, the countries were not on good terms and engaged each other in several military skirmishes. The Libyan government of Muammar Gaddafi funded terror operations against the United States, most notably the 1986 Berlin discotheque bombing, to which the United States retaliated by bombing Libya, and the 1988 Lockerbie bombing.

When the Libyan civil war broke out in 2011, the United States took part in a military intervention in the conflict, aiding anti-Gaddafi rebels with air strikes against the Libyan Army. With the success of the revolution and the overthrow of Gaddafi, US President Barack Obama said that the United States was "committed to the Libyan people" and promised partnership in the development of a new Libyan state.

According to a 2012 poll conducted by Gallup, 54% of Libyans approve of U.S. leadership, compared to only 22% and 19% respective approval for China and Russia's, and 75% of Libyans say they approved of NATO's military intervention in the civil war.

The U.S. began operations in Libya again on November 13, 2015, with permission from the GNA, as part of the military intervention against ISIL.

== History ==
=== Kingdom of Libya (1951–1969) ===
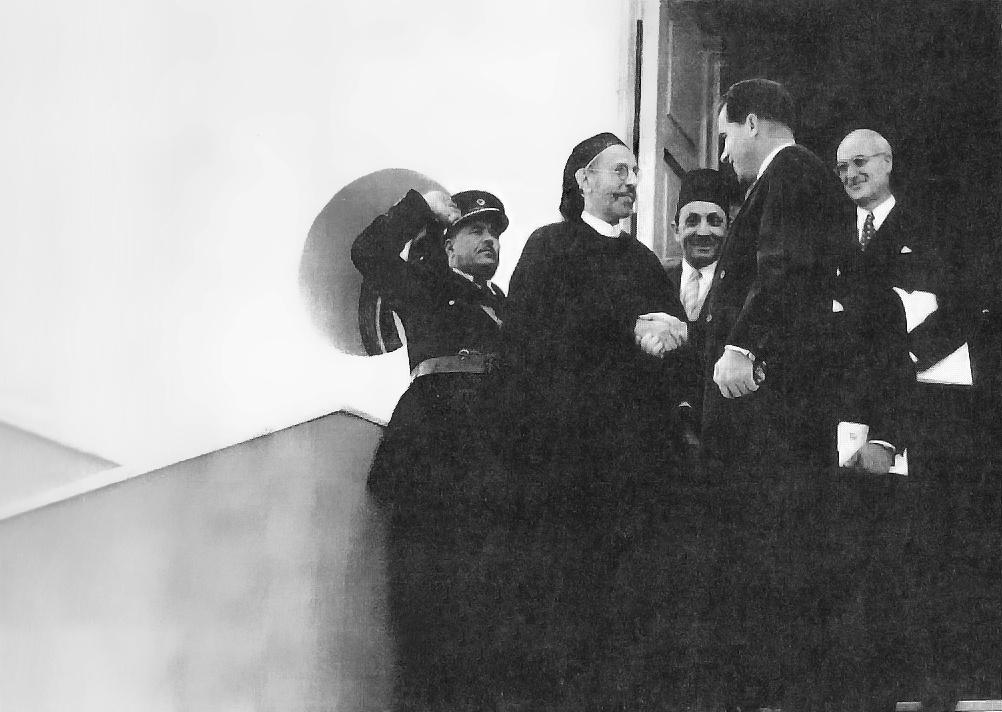
Vice President Richard Nixon meeting King Idris of Libya in 1957. The king sought cordial relations with the U.S.

Following Italy's colonial occupation of Libya and the German occupation during World War II the U.S. leased the strategically important Wheelus Air Base from the Kingdom of Libya. The United States supported the UN resolution providing for Libyan independence in 1951 and accordingly raised the status of its office at Tripoli from a consulate general to a legation. Libya opened a legation in Washington, D.C., in 1954. Both countries subsequently raised their missions to embassy level.

Oil was discovered in Libya in 1959, and what had been one of the world's poorest countries became comparatively wealthy. The United States continued a generally warm relationship with Libya and pursued policies centered on interests in operations at Wheelus Air Base and the considerable U.S. oil interests. During the early 1960s, many children of U.S. oil personnel sent to develop the oil field installations and pipelines were allowed to attend the high school facility at Wheelus, typically riding buses from residential areas in or near Tripoli. Classes often had to pause briefly while large aircraft were taking off.

The strategic value of Wheelus as a bomber base declined with the development of nuclear missiles and Wheelus served as a tactical fighter training facility in the 1960s. In September 1969 King Idris I was overthrown by a group of military officers centered around Muammar Gaddafi. Before the revolution, the U.S. and Libya had already reached agreement on U.S. withdrawal from Wheelus; this proceeded according to plan, and the facility was turned over to the new Libyan authorities on June 11, 1970.

=== Libya under Gaddafi (1969–2011) ===
Libya-United States relations

- Libya: United States

Diplomatic mission
- Embassy of Libya, Washington, D.C.: Embassy of the United States, Tripoli

After Muammar Gaddafi's 1969 coup, U.S.-Libyan relations became increasingly strained when Gaddafi removed the American oil companies by nationalizing the oil industry. In 1972, the United States recalled its ambassador. Export controls on military and civil aircraft were imposed during the 1970s, and U.S. embassy staff members were withdrawn from Tripoli after a mob attacked and set fire to the embassy in December 1979. The U.S. Government designated Libya a "state sponsor of terrorism" on December 29, 1979. Throughout the 1970s Gaddafi was a vocal supporter of the Palestinians and anti-Israeli Arab governments and he supported the Arab states during the Yom Kippur War and the Arab Oil Embargo.

==== Gulf of Sidra incident ====
On August 19, 1981, the Gulf of Sidra incident occurred. Two Libyan Sukhoi Su-22 jets fired on U.S. aircraft participating in a routine naval exercise over international waters of the Mediterranean claimed by Libya. The U.S. planes returned fire and shot down the attacking Libyan aircraft. On December 11, 1981, the U.S. State Department invalidated U.S. passports for travel to Libya and, for purposes of safety, advised all U.S. citizens in Libya to leave. In March 1982, the U.S. Government prohibited imports of Libyan crude oil into the United States and expanded the controls on U.S.-origin goods intended for export to Libya. Licenses were required for all transactions, except food and medicine. In March 1984, U.S. export controls were expanded to prohibit future exports to the Ras Lanuf petrochemical complex. In April 1985, all Export-Import Bank financing was prohibited.

United States adopted additional economic sanctions against Libya in January 1986, including a total ban on direct import and export trade, commercial contracts, and travel-related activities. In addition, Libyan Government assets in the United States were frozen. When Libyan complicity was reported in the 1986 Berlin discotheque bombing, which killed two American servicemen, the United States responded by launching an aerial bombing attack against targets near Tripoli and Benghazi in April 1986 (see Operation El Dorado Canyon). At least 15 people died in the U.S. air strikes on Libya – including leader Colonel Gaddafi's adopted 15-month-old daughter – and more than 100 were injured. Subsequently, the United States maintained its trade and travel embargoes and brought diplomatic and economic pressure to bear against Libya. This pressure helped to bring about the Lockerbie settlement and Libya's renunciation of WMD and MTCR-class missiles.

In 1991, two Libyan intelligence agents were indicted by federal prosecutors in the U.S. and Scotland for their involvement in the December 1988 bombing of Pan Am flight 103 near Lockerbie, Scotland. In January 1992, the UN Security Council approved Resolution 731 demanding that Libya surrender the suspects, cooperate with the Pan Am 103 and UTA 772 investigations, pay compensation to the victims' families, and cease all support for terrorism. Libya's refusal to comply led to the approval of UNSC Resolution 748 on March 31, 1992, imposing sanctions designed to bring about Libyan compliance. Continued Libyan defiance led to passage of Security Council Resolution 883—a limited assets freeze and an embargo on selected oil equipment—in November 1993. In March 2003, Tripoli secretly approached Washington and London with an offer to reveal the scope of its WMD programs. This led to covert negotiations in Libya, which in turn resulted, on December 19, 2003, in the country's public disclosure of the extent of their WMD research and capabilities. UN sanctions had been lifted on September 12, 2003, after Libya fulfilled all remaining UNSCR requirements pertaining to the Lockerbie bombing, including renunciation of terrorism, acceptance of responsibility for the actions of its officials, and payment of appropriate compensation to the victims' families.

==== Normalizing relations ====
After its public announcement of December, 2003, the Gaddafi government cooperated with the U.S., the U.K., the International Atomic Energy Agency, and the Organization for the Prohibition of Chemical Weapons toward these objectives. Libya also signed the IAEA Additional Protocol and has become a State Party to the Chemical Weapons Convention.

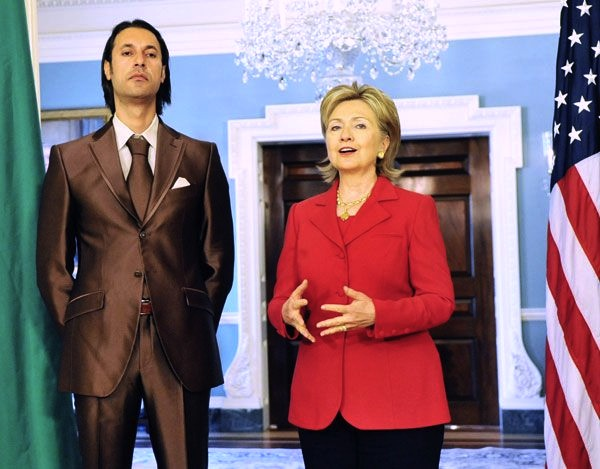
Libyan National Security Adviser Mutassim Gaddafi with Hillary Clinton in 2009

In recognition of these actions, the U.S. began the process of normalizing relations with Libya. The U.S. terminated the applicability of the Iran and Libya Sanctions Act to Libya and the President signed an Executive Order on September 20, 2004, terminating the national emergency with respect to Libya and ending IEEPA-based economic sanctions. This action had the effect of unblocking assets blocked under the Executive Order sanctions. Restrictions on cargo aviation and third-party code-sharing have been lifted, as have restrictions on passenger aviation. Certain export controls remain in place.

U.S. diplomatic personnel reopened the U.S. Interest Section in Tripoli on February 8, 2004. In the same month, the U.S. State Department lifted the 23-year travel ban on Libya. The U.S. Interest Section was upgraded to a U.S. Liaison Office on June 28, 2004, and to a full embassy on May 31, 2006. The establishment in 2005 of an American School in Tripoli demonstrates the increased presence of Americans in Libya, and the continuing normalization of bilateral relations. Libya re-established its diplomatic presence in Washington with the opening of an Interest Section on July 8, 2004, which was subsequently upgraded to a Liaison Office in December 2004 and to a full embassy on May 31, 2006.

On May 15, 2006, the US State Department announced its intention to rescind Libya's designation as a state sponsor of terrorism in recognition of the fact that Libya had met the statutory requirements for such a move: it had not provided any support for acts of international terrorism in the preceding six-month period, and had provided assurances that it would not do so in the future. On June 30, 2006, the U.S. rescinded Libya's designation as a state sponsor of terrorism. In July 2007, Mr. Gene Cretz was nominated by President Bush as ambassador to Libya. The Foreign Relations Committee of the U.S. Senate held Cretz's confirmation hearing on Wednesday, September 25, 2008. The Libyan government satisfied its responsibility and paid the remaining amount of money it owed (total of $1.5 billion) to the victims of several acts of terrorism on Friday, October 31, 2008. That same year, the United States and Libya also signed a bilateral Agreement on Science and Technology Cooperation.

Principal U.S. Officials included Chargé d'Affaires William Milam and Deputy Principal Officer J. Christopher Stevens.

==== 2011 Libyan Civil War ====
Relations were again severely strained by the outbreak of the 2011 Libyan Civil War, in which Gaddafi attempted to crush first protests, and then an armed rebellion against his rule. The U.S. government cut ties with the Gaddafi regime, and enacted sanctions against senior regime members. White House Press Secretary Jay Carney said that the legitimacy of Gaddafi's regime had been "reduced to zero". The US, along with several European and Arab nations, then began to call for the United Nations to authorise military intervention in the conflict. US ambassador to the UN Susan Rice successfully pressured Russia and China not to veto the resolution, and it passed on March 17, 2011.

The US military played an instrumental role in the initial stage of the intervention, suppressing Libyan air defenses and coordinating international forces in the establishment of a no-fly zone over Libya, before handing command responsibility to NATO and taking a supporting role in the campaign of air strikes against pro-Gaddafi forces. The intervention severely weakened the Gaddafi regime and aided the rebels to victory, with the fall of Tripoli in August 2011.

In 2026, emails from July 2011 were revealed to show that Jeffrey Epstein and an associate named Greg Brown discussed plans to extort Libyan officials and seize state assets under the pretext of helping rebuild the country, with the involvement from former MI6 and Mossad.

=== Post-Gaddafi Libya (2011–present) ===
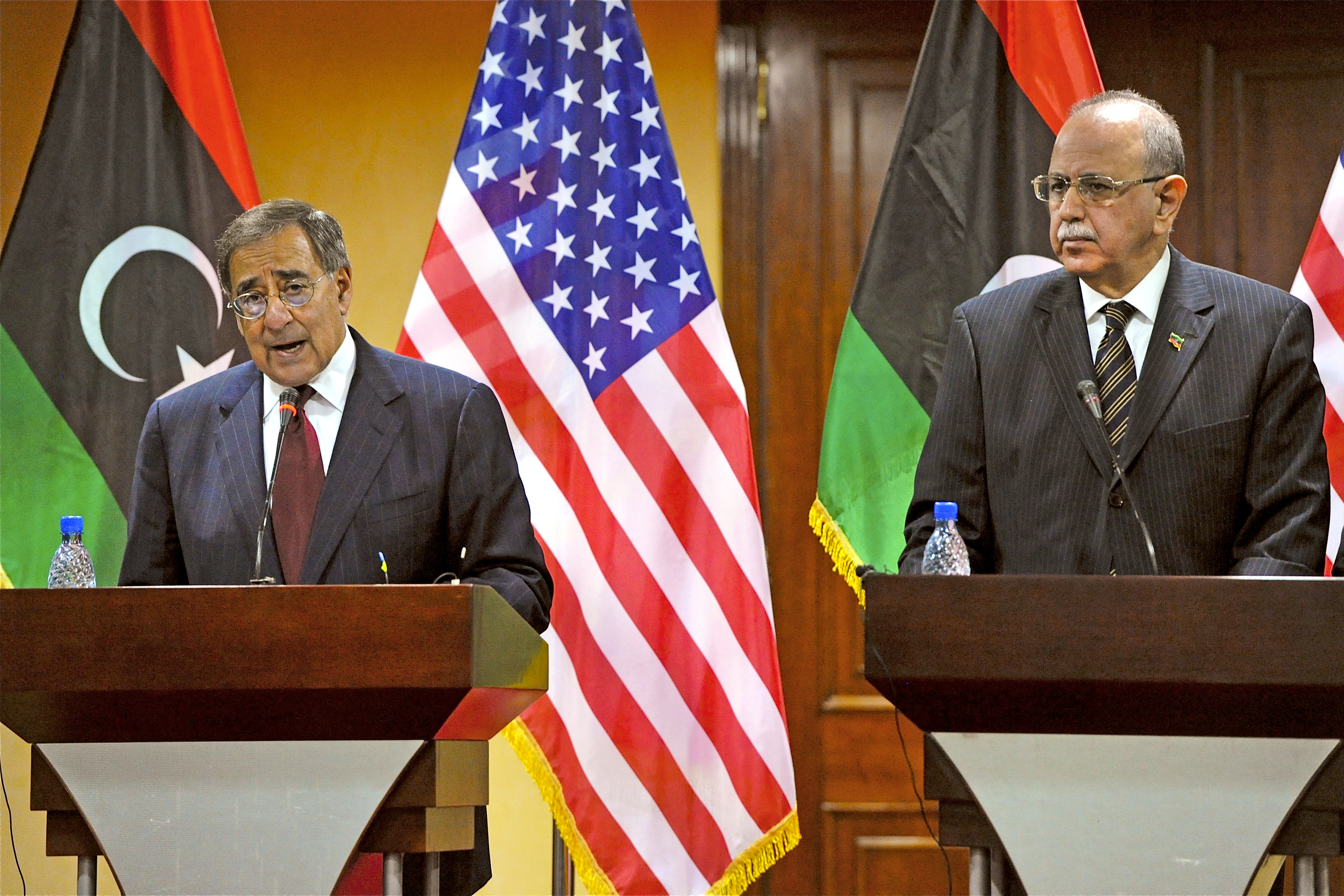
U.S. Defense Secretary Leon Panetta and Transitional Libyan Prime Minister Abdurrahim El-Keib conduct a press conference in Tripoli, Libya on Dec. 17, 2011.

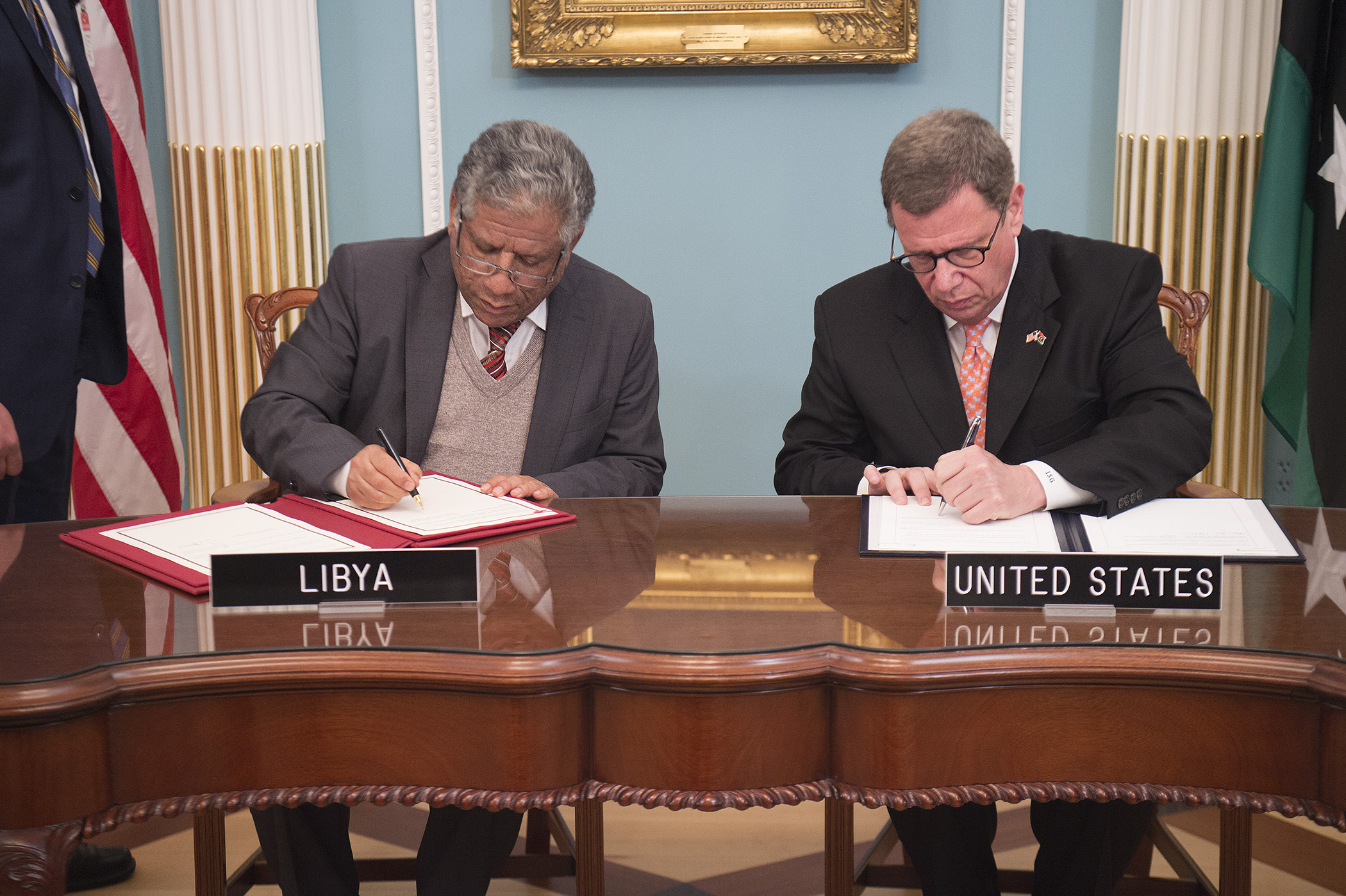
Representatives sign a Memorandum of Understanding on cultural property protection in 2018.

The United States' first direct contact with the anti-Gaddafi opposition came on March 14, 2011, when Secretary of State Hillary Clinton met with National Transitional Council leader Mahmoud Jibril in Paris. The US took longer than other leading NTC allies to formally recognise the council as Libya's legitimate authority, but it did so on July 15, and it granted accreditation to Ali Aujali as the Libyan Ambassador to the United States on August 15. Later that month, the US led an effort at the United Nations to repeal parts of United Nations Security Council Resolution 1970 in order to allow unfrozen Libyan assets to be transferred to the interim government. When the civil war came to an end in October, US President Barack Obama pledged to work with the new Libyan government as a partner, and said the United States was "committed to the Libyan people".

US relations with the new Libyan government were thrust into the spotlight on September 11, 2012, when gunmen attacked and firebombed the US liaison office/mission in Benghazi, killing 4 Americans including Ambassador J. Christopher Stevens. Libya's interim leader Mohammed Magarief quickly condemned the attack and apologised to the US, describing it as "cowardly" and pledging to bring the killers to justice. Demonstrations denouncing the attack and supporting the United States were held in Benghazi the next day, with protesters mourning Stevens and signs declaring him 'a friend to all Libyans'. Libya cooperated with the US to investigate the attack, closing Benghazi's airspace for several hours to allow US drone patrols over the city on September 14.

December 2, 2013, the United States and Libya entered into the U.S.-Libya Declaration of Intent, a declaration intended to increase cooperation in law enforcement investigations and fulfill international crime-fighting obligations.

On 27 May 2014, the United States advised all U.S. citizens in the country to leave immediately. Citing the unstable and unpredictable security situation in Libya, the United States also warned its citizens to avoid travel to the country.

The U.S. Embassy in Libya was evacuated and closed on July 26, 2014. Embassy staff totaling approximately 150 personnel, including about 80 U.S. Marines, were evacuated overland to Tunisia during a military assisted departure. USAF F-16's provided armed overwatch for the embassy convoy as they drove through Libya. The evacuation was due to major fighting around the embassy related to the 2014 Libyan Civil War.

However, the United States did not sever diplomatic relations with Libya. Working from the U.S. Embassies in Valletta, Malta and, after August 2015, Tunis, Tunisia under the authority of the U.S. Ambassador to Libya, U.S. diplomats in the Libya External Affairs Office maintained regular dialogue with the provisional Libyan Government.

== See also ==
- Foreign relations of Libya
- Foreign relations of the United States
- Libyan Americans
- Embassy of Libya, Washington, D.C.
- List of ambassadors of the United States to Libya
- CIA activities in Libya
