= United Nations Security Council Resolution 1506 =

UN Security Council Resolution 1506
- Libya in the African Union
- Date: 12 September 2003
- Meeting no.: 4,820
- Code: S/RES/1506 (Document)
- Subject: The situation concerning Libya
- Voting summary: 13 voted for; None voted against; 2 abstained
- Result: Adopted

Security Council composition
- Permanent members: China; France; Russia; United Kingdom; United States
- Non-permanent members: Angola; Bulgaria; Chile; Cameroon; Germany; Guinea; Mexico; Pakistan; Spain; Syria

United Nations Security Council resolution 1506, adopted on 12 September 2003, after recalling resolutions 731 (1992), 748 (1992), 883 (1993) and 1192 (1998) concerning the destruction of Pan Am Flight 103 over Lockerbie, Scotland in 1988 and UTA Flight 772 over Niger in 1989, the council lifted sanctions against Libya imposed after the country failed to co-operate with investigations into the destruction of the aircraft.

The Security Council welcomed steps the Libyan government had taken to comply with Security Council resolutions concerning the acceptance of responsibility of Libyan officials, compensation payments, renouncing terrorism and a commitment to co-operate with further requests for information in the investigation. Acting under Chapter VII of the United Nations Charter, the council lifted prohibitions–ban on military sales, air communications and certain oil equipment–imposed in previous resolutions concerning Libya and dissolved the committee established to monitor the sanctions.

The resolution, proposed by Bulgaria and the United Kingdom, concluded by removing the issue from the matters with which the council was seized. It was adopted by 13 votes to none against and two abstentions from France and the United States which expressed reservations about Libya's willingness to follow through with its commitments. Libyan state radio hailed the move as a "victory".

== See also ==
- Foreign relations of Libya
- Investigation into the bombing of Pan Am Flight 103
- List of United Nations Security Council Resolutions 1501 to 1600 (2003–2005)
