= United Nations Security Council Resolution 1192 =

UN Security Council Resolution 1192
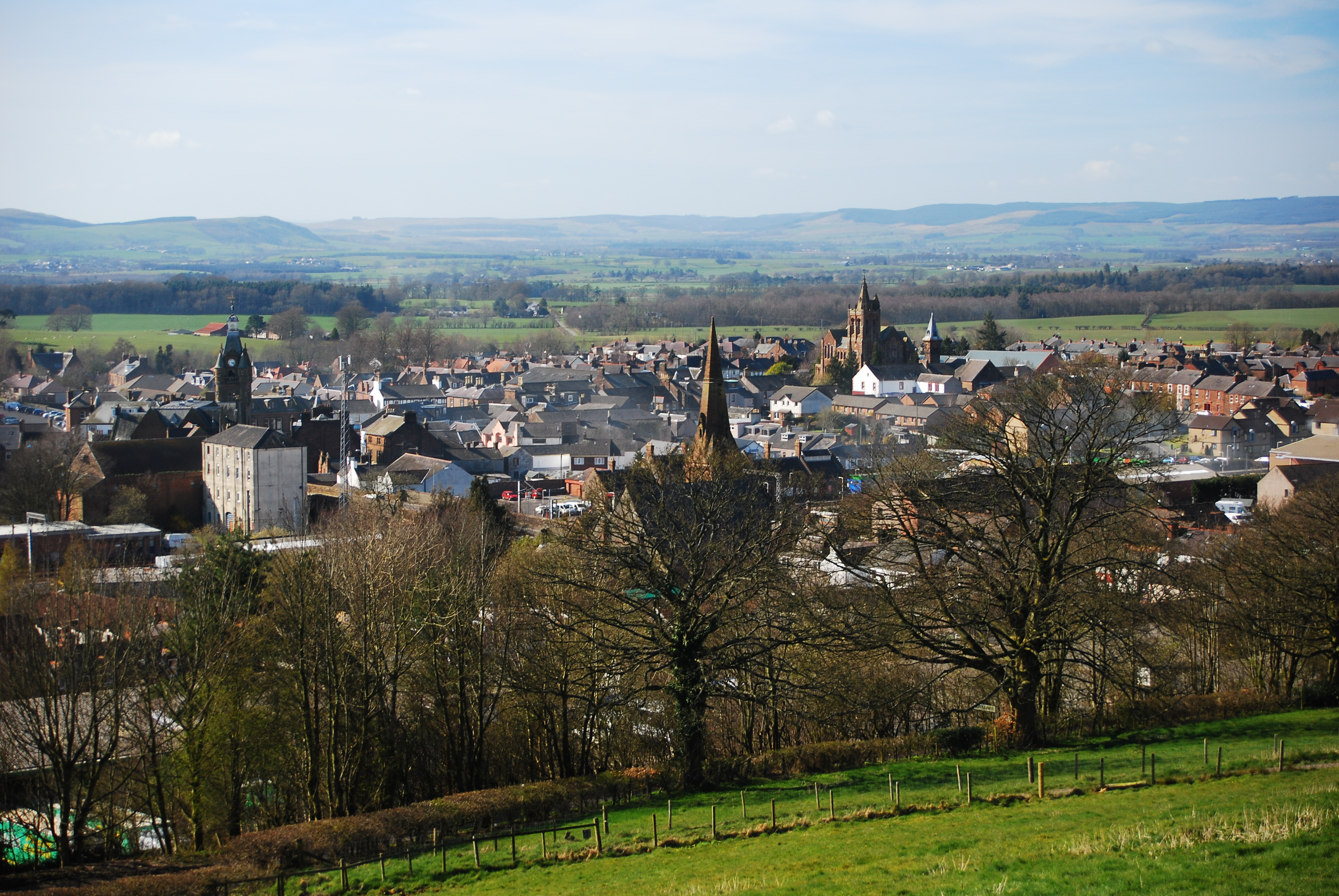
- Lockerbie in Scotland
- Date: 27 August 1998
- Meeting no.: 3,920
- Code: S/RES/1192 (Document)
- Subject: The Lockerbie case
- Voting summary: 15 voted for; None voted against; None abstained
- Result: Adopted

Security Council composition
- Permanent members: China; France; Russia; United Kingdom; United States
- Non-permanent members: Bahrain; Brazil; Costa Rica; Gabon; Gambia; Japan; Kenya; Portugal; Slovenia; Sweden

UN Security Council Resolution 1192, adopted unanimously on 27 August 1998, after recalling resolutions 731 (1992), 748 (1992) and 883 (1993), the council welcomed an initiative to try two Libyan suspects accused of the bombing of Pan Am Flight 103 before a Scottish court in the Netherlands.

The Security Council noted a report of independent experts and communications by the Organisation of African Unity, the League of Arab States, the Non-Aligned Movement and Organisation of the Islamic Conference and, acting under Chapter VII of the United Nations Charter, demanded that Libya comply with previous Security Council resolutions. It welcomed the initiative proposed by the United Kingdom and United States and the willingness of the Government of the Netherlands to co-operate with the initiative to try the two Libyan suspects–Abdelbaset al-Megrahi and Lamin Khalifah Fhimah–at a Scottish Court in the country. In this regard, both the United Kingdom and the Netherlands were asked to specify arrangements. Libya said initially it was "not bound" by the plan.

The Libyan government was called upon to ensure that the two suspects, evidence and witnesses would appear before the court, while the Secretary-General Kofi Annan was invited to nominate international observers to the trial. The council decided that the Netherlands could detain the two suspects for the purpose of trial.

Finally, Resolution 1192 concluded by reaffirming previous resolutions 748 and 883 which imposed international sanctions on Libya, stating that the provisions remained in effect and all states were to co-operate in implementing them. It was further decided that the measures would be suspended if the Secretary-General reports that the two Libyans had arrived for the trial or appeared before a court in the United Kingdom or United States, and whether Libya had satisfied the French judicial authorities with regard to the bombing of UTA Flight 772 over Niger in 1989. The council warned that additional measures would be imposed if the provisions of the current resolution were not met.

== See also ==
- Foreign relations of Libya
- Hans Köchler's Lockerbie trial observer mission
- Investigation into the bombing of Pan Am Flight 103
- List of United Nations Security Council Resolutions 1101 to 1200 (1997–1998)
- Pan Am Flight 103 bombing trial
