= Foreign relations of Libya (disambiguation) =

Foreign relations of Libya throughout history went through several periods:

- Foreign relations of Libya, for relations since 2011
- Foreign relations of Libya under Muammar Gaddafi, for 1969–2011
- Kingdom of Libya § International relations, for 1951–1969
