= Libya and state-sponsored terrorism =

After the military overthrow of King Idris in 1969, Libya supported several armed paramilitary groups by providing weapon supplies, monetary finances and through training camps located within Libya.

== Sponsorship ==
After the military overthrow of King Idris in 1969 the Libyan Arab Republic (later the Great Socialist People's Libyan Arab Jamahiriya), the new government supported (with weapon supplies, training camps located within Libya and monetary finances) an array of armed paramilitary groups largely left as well as some right-wing. Leftist and socialist groups included the Provisional Irish Republican Army, the Basque Fatherland and Liberty, the Umkhonto We Sizwe, the Polisario Front, the Kurdistan Workers' Party, the Túpac Amaru Revolutionary Movement, the Palestine Liberation Organization, Popular Front for the Liberation of Palestine, Free Aceh Movement, Free Papua Movement, National Patriotic Front of Liberia, Fretilin, Kanak and Socialist National Liberation Front, Republic of South Maluku and the Moro National Liberation Front of the Philippines.

In 2006, Libya was removed from the United States list of terrorist supporting nations after it had ended all of its support for armed groups and the development of weapons of mass destruction.

== See also ==
- Pan Am Flight 103
- UTA Flight 772
- West Berlin discotheque bombing
- Iran and state-sponsored terrorism
- Israel and state-sponsored terrorism
- Kuwait and state-sponsored terrorism
- Pakistan and state-sponsored terrorism
- Qatar and state-sponsored terrorism
- United States and state-sponsored terrorism
