= United Nations Security Council Resolution 883 =

UN Security Council Resolution 883
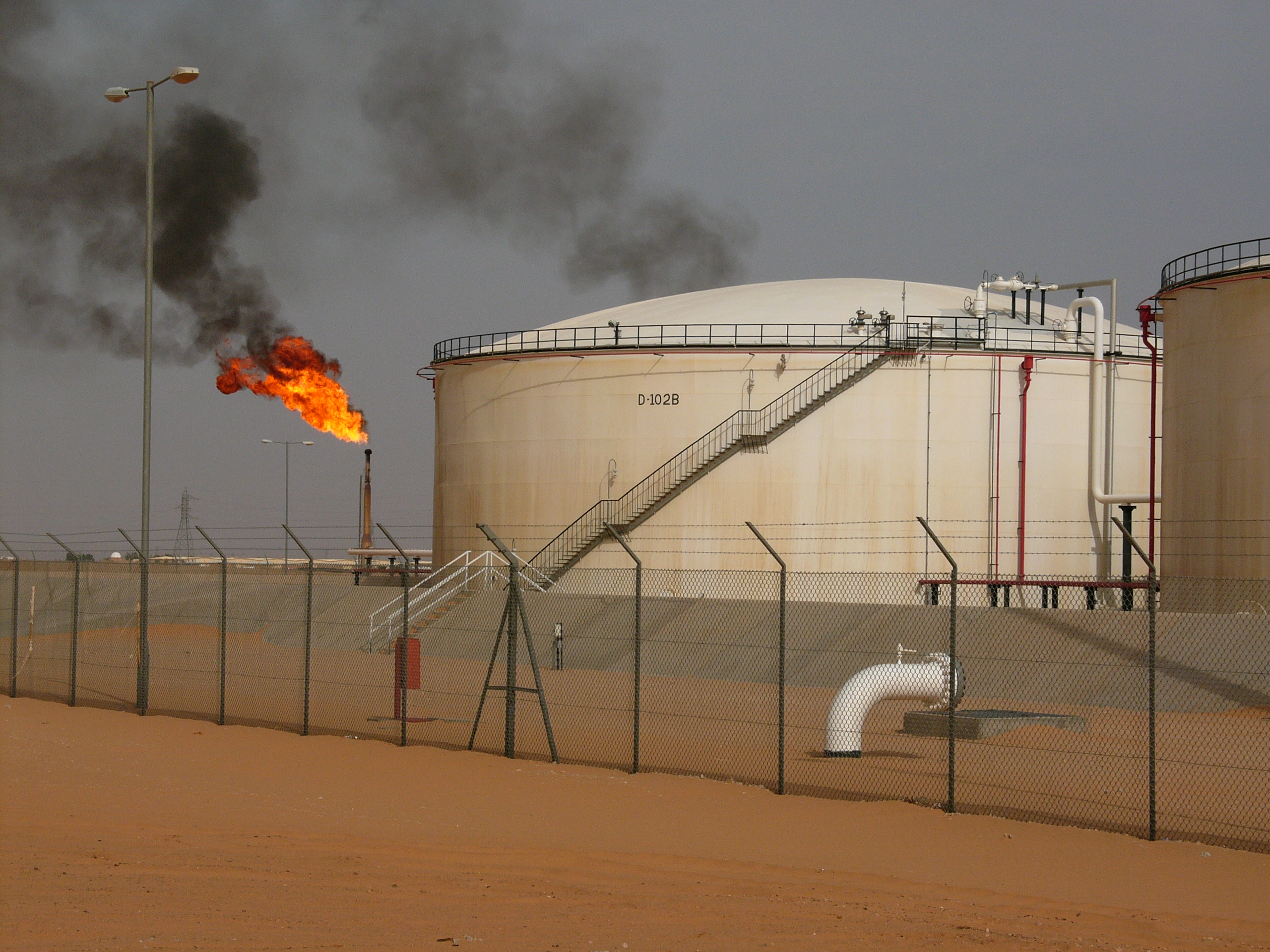
- Libyan oil field
- Date: 11 November 1993
- Meeting no.: 3,312
- Code: S/RES/883 (Document)
- Subject: Libyan Arab Jamahiriya
- Voting summary: 11 voted for; None voted against; 4 abstained
- Result: Adopted

Security Council composition
- Permanent members: China; France; Russia; United Kingdom; United States
- Non-permanent members: Brazil; Cape Verde; Djibouti; Hungary; Japan; Morocco; New Zealand; Pakistan; Spain; Venezuela

UN Security Council Resolution 883, adopted on 11 November 1993, after reaffirming resolutions 731 (1992) and 748 (1992), the council noted that, twenty months later, Libya had not complied with previous Security Council resolutions and as a consequence imposed further international sanctions on the country.

The council expressed its determination to eliminate international terrorism and that those responsible for acts of terrorism would be brought to justice. In the context that the suppression of these acts is essential for international peace and security, it was noted that Libya had refused to comply with previous security council resolutions and its renunciation of terrorism, which the council determined to be a threat to international peace and security. At the same time, letters from representatives of Libya in which it stated its intention to encourage those accused of the bombing of Pan Am Flight 103 over Lockerbie, Scotland and the bombing of UTA Flight 772 over Chad and Niger to co-operate with the concerned authorities was noted.

Acting under Chapter VII of the United Nations Charter, the council demanded that Libya comply with resolutions 731 and 748. To ensure the Libyan government's compliance with the aforementioned resolutions, the following measures would take effect as of 00:01 EST on 1 December 1993. Firstly, all countries were required to freeze Libyan funds or other financial resources in their territory, though this would not apply to funds or other financial resources derived from the sale or supply of petroleum and petroleum products, natural gas and gas products and agricultural products. Furthermore, sales, marketing or licensing of the following were prohibited:

(a) large pumps and motors used for transporting oil and gas;
(b) equipment for oil terminals;
(c) large pumps that could be used for oil transport;
(d) refining equipment;
(e) spare parts for any of the above.

The council also decided that, to make the provisions of Resolution 748 effective, all countries should:

(a) close offices of Libyan Arab Airlines;
(b) prohibit commercial transactions, including tickets, with Libyan Arab Airlines;
(c) prohibit aircraft or accessories available for service, and maintenance or servicing of aircraft in Libya;
(d) prohibit the supply of construction materials, improvement or maintenance of Libyan airports;
(e) prohibit advice, assistance or training to Libyan pilots, flight engineers or maintenance personnel;
(f) prohibit any renewal of insurance for Libyan aircraft
(g) continue to significantly reduce staff at Libyan diplomatic missions and consular posts.

The committee established by the security council in Resolution 748 was instructed to draw up guidelines for the implementation of the above measures and to deal with requests for assistance under Article 50 of the United Nations Charter for countries that suffered indirectly as a result of the sanctions. All states and international organisations were urged to co-operate with the provisions of the current resolution and to report to the UN Secretary-General Boutros Boutros-Ghali on measures they had taken to implement the resolution. At the same time, Libya was urged to co-operate, while the council affirmed that the present resolution did not affect Libya's duty to adhere to all of its obligations concerning servicing and repayment of foreign debt. Measures taken by the council were to be reviewed after noting co-operation by Libya with regard to the bombing of Pan Am Flight 103 and UTA Flight 772.

Resolution 883 was adopted by 11 votes to none, with four abstentions, from China, Djibouti, Morocco and Pakistan. Russia had previously threatened to veto the resolution, but after negotiations supported the provisions after stating its intention to recover the debt owed to it by Libya over purchases of weapons.

Libya responded by closing its borders with Tunisia and Egypt for three days, denouncing the resolution as a product of hostile policy from the United Nations and affirming the need to seek a resolution to the crisis as soon as possible.

== See also ==
- Chadian–Libyan conflict
- Foreign relations of Libya
- Investigation into the bombing of Pan Am Flight 103
- List of United Nations Security Council Resolutions 801 to 900 (1993–1994)
