= Embassy of Libya, Washington, D.C. =

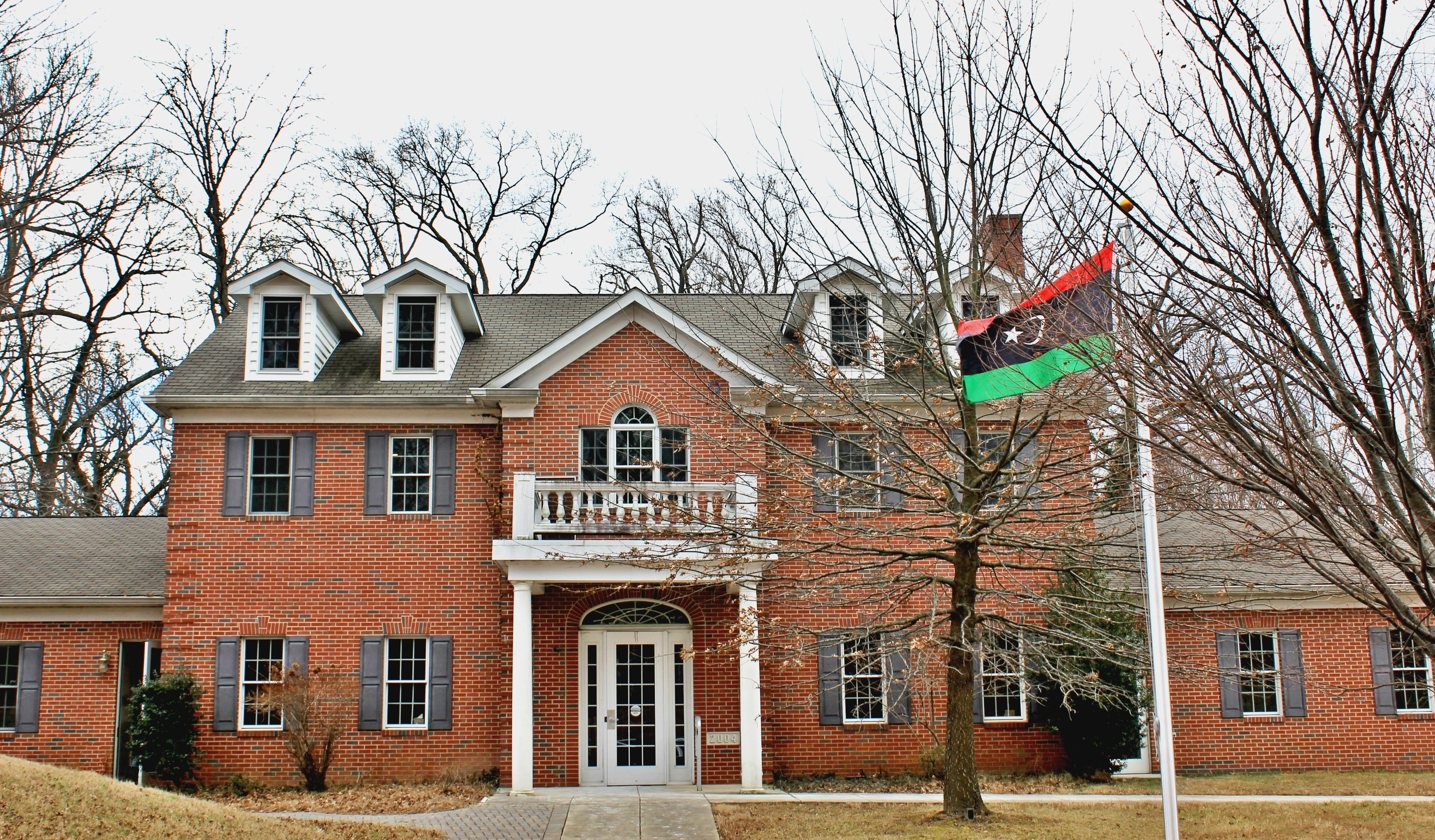
- Location: Washington, D.C.
- Address: 1460 Dahlia Street Northwest, Washington, DC
- Coordinates: 38°58′32″N 77°02′04″W
- Ambassador: Wafa Bughaighis
- Website: http://www.embassyoflibyadc.org/

The Embassy of Libya in Washington, D.C. is the diplomatic mission of Libya to the United States. It is located at 1460 Dahlia Street NW Washington, DC 20012, in the Shepherd Park neighborhood.

== History ==
Currently, Fadil Omar is acting Chargé d'affaires of the Embassy of Libya since 17 July 2023, after the end of mission of Khaled Daief the former acting as chargé d'affaires of the Embassy. Prior to August 2021, Wafa Bughaighis was ambassador.

The former ambassador is Ali Aujali.

As a result of the 2011 Libyan civil war, in March 2011, the U.S. suspended relations with the Libyan embassy in Washington, D.C.

In July 2011, at an international conference on Libya held in Turkey, Secretary of State Hillary Clinton stated that the US had decided to formally recognize the National Transitional Council as the country's "legitimate authority". In August 2011, the State Department approved plans to allow the National Transitional Council to re-open the Libyan embassy in Washington. The embassy officially re-opened on 12 August with Ali Aujali accredited as the head of the mission.
