= United Nations Security Council Resolution 748 =

UN Security Council Resolution 748
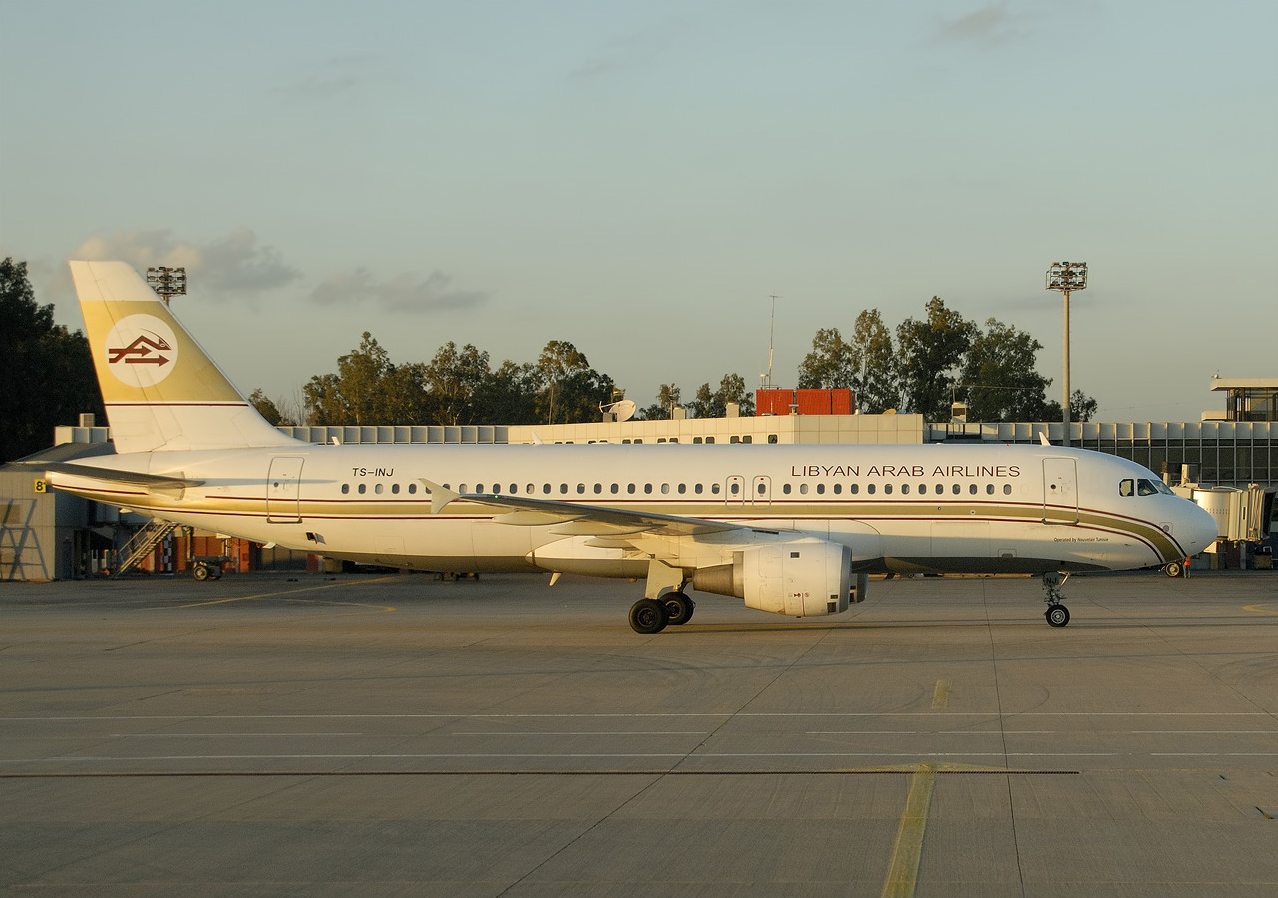
- Libyan Arab Airlines
- Date: 31 March 1992
- Meeting no.: 3,063
- Code: S/RES/748 (Document)
- Subject: Libyan Arab Jamahiriya
- Voting summary: 10 voted for; None voted against; 5 abstained
- Result: Adopted

Security Council composition
- Permanent members: China; France; Russia; United Kingdom; United States
- Non-permanent members: Austria; Belgium; Cape Verde; Ecuador; Hungary; India; Japan; Morocco; Venezuela; Zimbabwe

UN Security Council Resolution 748, adopted unanimously on 31 March 1992, after reaffirming Resolution 731 (1992), the UN Security Council decided, under Chapter VII of the United Nations Charter, that demanded Government of Libya's immediate compliance with requests from investigations relating to the destruction of Pan Am Flight 103 over Lockerbie and UTA Flight 772 over Chad and Niger, calling on Libya to cease all forms of terrorist action and assistance to terrorist groups. To this end, the council imposed sanctions on Libya until Libya complied.

== Overview ==
The resolution decided that, from 15 April 1992, all member states should:

(a) deny permission of Libyan aircraft to take off from, land in or overfly their territory if it has taken off from Libyan territory, excluding humanitarian need;
(b) prohibit the supply of aircraft or aircraft components or the provision or servicing of aircraft or aircraft components;
(c) prohibit the provision of weapons, ammunition or other military equipment to Libya and technical advice or training;
(d) withdraw officials present in Libya that advise the Libyan authorities on military matters;
(e) significantly reduce diplomatic and consular personnel in Libya;
(f) prevent the operation of all Libyan Airlines offices;
(g) deny or expel Libyan nationals involved in terrorist activities in other states.

The council called upon member states to strictly observe the sanctions, and established a committee of the security council that would seek information from member states on how they are implementing the resolution, ways to improve the effectiveness of the embargoes and consider any requests from states that experience problems as a result of the sanctions. It urged full co-operation from all states with the committee, and decided that the council should review the embargo every 120 days.

Resolution 748 was adopted by 10 votes to none against, with five abstentions from Cape Verde, China, India, Morocco and Zimbabwe. By passing the resolution under Chapter VII, Libya was bound by the provisions of the council even if they were in conflict with the Montreal Convention.

Libya refused to comply with the Resolution 748 or Resolution 731, and the council responded by adopting more extensive measures in Resolution 883 (1993).

== See also ==
- Chadian–Libyan conflict
- Foreign relations of Libya
- Investigation into the bombing of Pan Am Flight 103
- List of United Nations Security Council Resolutions 701 to 800 (1991–1993)
