= United Nations Security Council Resolution 731 =

UN Security Council Resolution 731
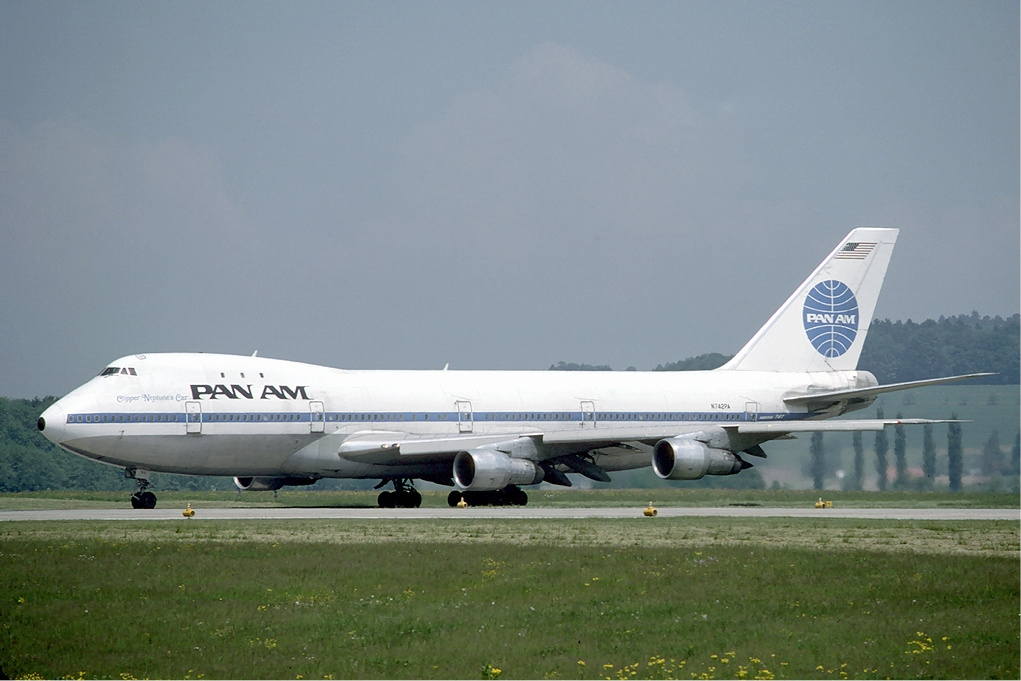
- A Pan Am Boeing 747 similar to the one involved in the Flight 103 crash (1985)
- Date: 21 January 1992
- Meeting no.: 3,033
- Code: S/RES/731 (Document)
- Subject: Libyan Arab Jamahiriya
- Voting summary: 15 voted for; None voted against; None abstained
- Result: Adopted

Security Council composition
- Permanent members: China; France; Russia; United Kingdom; United States
- Non-permanent members: Austria; Belgium; Cape Verde; Ecuador; Hungary; India; Japan; Morocco; Venezuela; Zimbabwe

UN Security Council Resolution 731 was adopted unanimously on 21 January 1992, after the Council recalled resolutions 286 (1970) and 635 (1989), which condemned acts of terrorism; the Council expressed concern over the results of investigations into the destruction of Pan Am Flight 103 over Lockerbie, Scotland, and UTA Flight 772 over Chad and Niger, which implicated officials from the Government of Libya.

The Council condemned that Libya had not accepted responsibility for the incidents. It urged it to provide a complete and effective response to the investigations' requests regarding the two aircraft to contribute to the elimination of international terrorism. It also urged Member States to encourage the Libyan government to respond. Therefore, the resolution implied Libya extradited its accused nationals, Abdelbaset al-Megrahi and Lamin Khalifah Fhimah.

Resolution 731 was not legally binding, as it was passed under Chapter VI of the United Nations Charter and made no reference to Chapter VII; however, this would be enforced in Resolution 748.

== See also ==
- Chadian–Libyan conflict
- Foreign relations of Libya
- Investigation into the bombing of Pan Am Flight 103
- List of United Nations Security Council Resolutions 701 to 800 (1991–1993)
