= UTA Flight 772 =

1989 bombing of a French airliner in eastern Niger

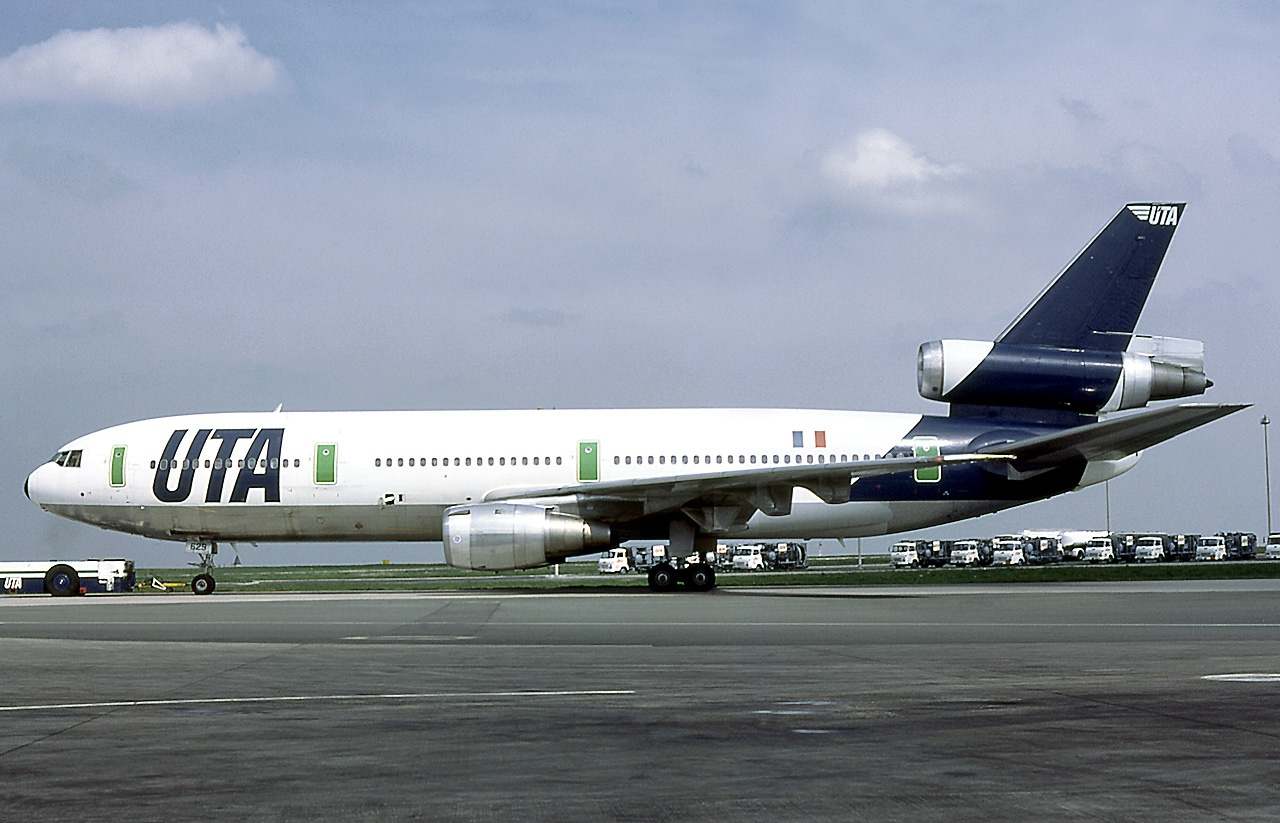
- N54629, the aircraft involved in the bombing, pictured in 1981

Bombing
- Date: 19 September 1989
- Summary: In-flight breakup due to terrorist bombing
- Site: Near Termit Massif, Northeast Zinder region, Ténéré, Niger; 16.86493°N 11.953712°E

Aircraft
- Aircraft type: McDonnell Douglas DC-10-30
- Operator: Union de Transports Aériens
- IATA flight No.: UT772
- ICAO flight No.: UTA772
- Call sign: UTA 772
- Registration: N54629
- Flight origin: Maya-Maya Airport, Brazzaville, People's Republic of the Congo
- Stopover: N'Djamena International Airport, N'Djamena, Chad
- Destination: Charles de Gaulle Airport, Paris, France
- Occupants: 170
- Passengers: 156
- Crew: 14
- Fatalities: 170
- Survivors: 0

UTA Flight 772 was a scheduled international passenger flight of the French airline Union de Transports Aériens (UTA) operating from Brazzaville in the People's Republic of the Congo, via N'Djamena in Chad, to Charles de Gaulle Airport in Paris, France. On 19 September 1989, the McDonnell Douglas DC-10 operating the flight crashed into the Ténéré desert near Bilma, Niger, killing all 170 people on board after an in-flight explosion caused by a suitcase bomb. It is the deadliest aviation incident to occur in Niger.

== Background ==
=== Aircraft ===
The aircraft, a McDonnell Douglas DC-10-30, with American registration N54629, serial number 46852, was manufactured in 1973 and first flew on 13 March. It was the 125th DC-10 produced, and had accumulated 14,777 flight cycles over 60,276 flight hours at the time of its hull loss. It was equipped with three General Electric CF6-50C2R engines.

=== Crew ===
The captain, 40-year-old Georges Raveneau, was an experienced pilot, with a total of 11,039 flight hours, 2,723 of which were on the DC-10. The left-seat pilot, 38-year-old Jean-Pierre Hennequin, had a total of 6,442 flight hours, 28 of which were on the DC-10. The first officer, 41-year-old Michel Crézé, had a total of 8,357 flight hours, 754 of which were on the DC-10. The flight engineer, 28-year-old Alain Bricout, had a total of 597 flight hours, 180 of which were on the DC-10.

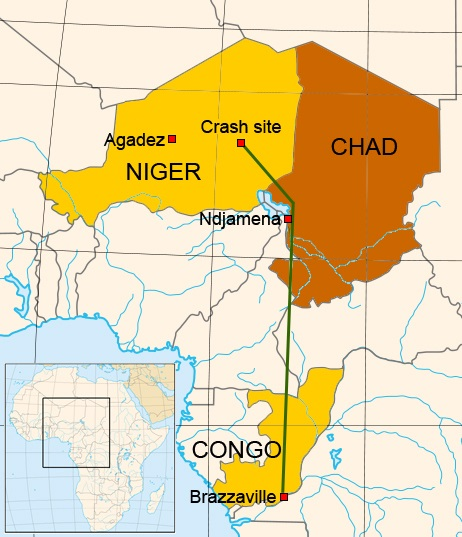
Route taken by UTA Flight 772.

== Incident ==
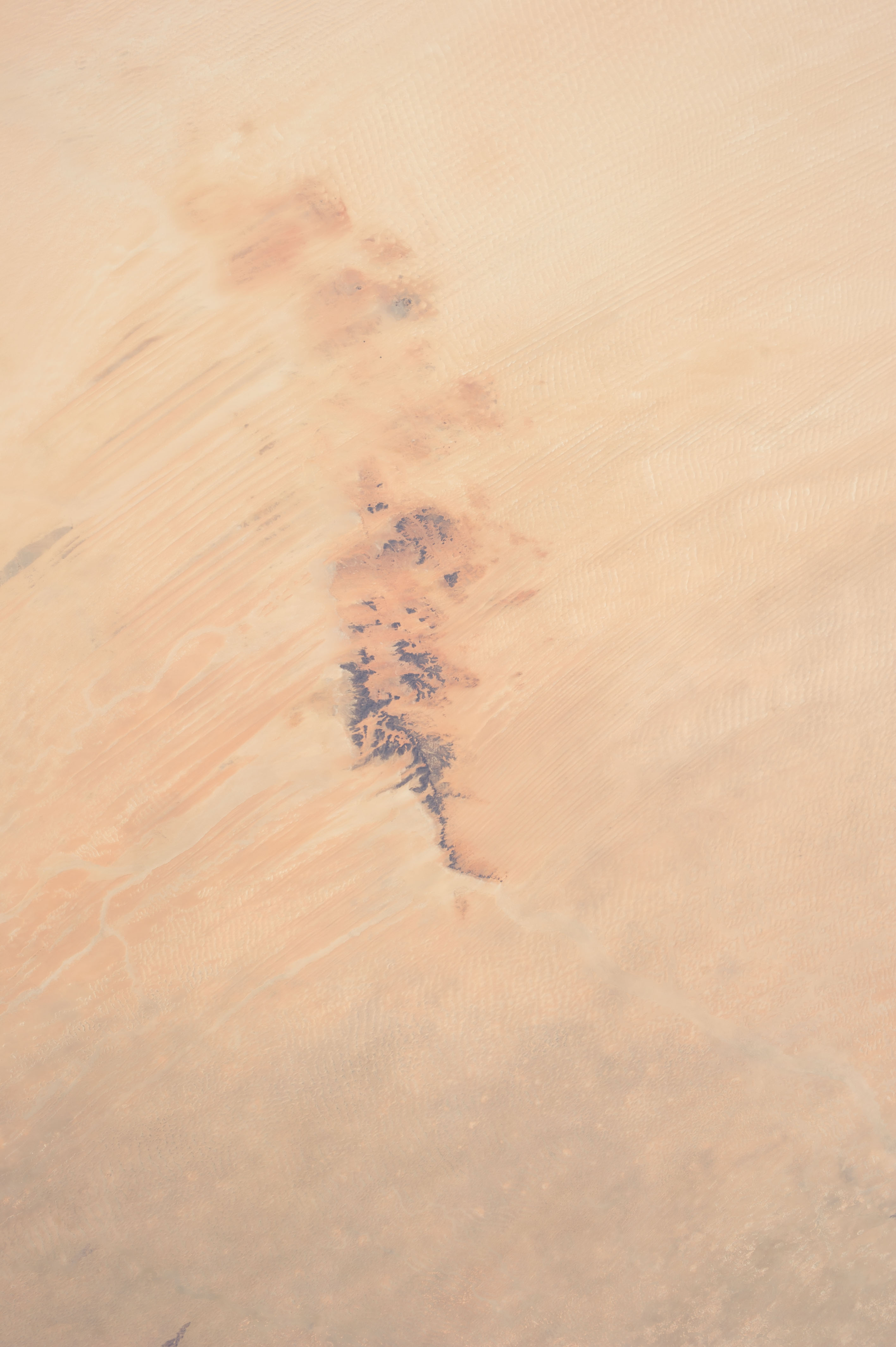
View of Southern Ténéré desert from ISS. Approximately north-east of Termit Massif (center), is located the place of the crash and memorial.

On Tuesday, 19 September 1989 the McDonnell Douglas DC-10 aircraft took off from N'Djamena International Airport at 13:13. Forty-six minutes later, at its cruising altitude of 35,100 feet (10,700 m), a suitcase bomb exploded in the cargo hold, causing UTA Flight 772 to break up over the Sahara 450 kilometres (280 mi; 240 nmi) east of Agadez in the southern Ténéré and to the north of the Termit Massif in the Zinder Region of Niger. The explosion scattered debris over hundreds of square miles of desert. All 170 occupants were killed.

== Victims ==
The victims came from 18 different countries, the majority being French, Chadian, and Congolese nationals. After the plane was bombed, Leonardo Leonardi, a spokesperson for the Italian Embassy in Paris, said that the embassy believed that six Italians were on the flight. A spokesperson of the Friars Minor Capuchin religious order said that two members of the order were on board the aircraft. The bishop of Moundou, Chad, was also on the flight.

The other countries with victims were Algeria, Belgium, Bolivia, Cameroon, Canada, the Central African Republic, Greece, Mali, Morocco, Senegal, Switzerland, the United Kingdom, the United States, and Zaire (now the Democratic Republic of the Congo). Eight of the fatalities were oil workers (from Esso, Parker, and Schlumberger) returning following the completion of drilling of the Kome-3 borehole in southern Chad.

Among the victims was Bonnie Barnes Pugh (née Coverley), wife of Robert L. Pugh, American ambassador to Chad at the time. Fifty of the 170 victims were never identified.

| Nationality | Passengers | Crew | Total |
|---|---|---|---|
| France | 40 | 14 | 54 |
| People's Republic of the Congo | 48 | 0 | 48 |
| Chad | 25 | 0 | 25 |
| Italy | 9 | 0 | 9 |
| United States | 7 | 0 | 7 |
| Cameroon | 5 | 0 | 5 |
| United Kingdom | 4 | 0 | 4 |
| Zaire | 3 | 0 | 3 |
| Canada | 3 | 0 | 3 |
| Central African Republic | 2 | 0 | 2 |
| Mali | 2 | 0 | 2 |
| Switzerland | 2 | 0 | 2 |
| Algeria | 1 | 0 | 1 |
| Belgium | 1 | 0 | 1 |
| Bolivia | 1 | 0 | 1 |
| Greece | 1 | 0 | 1 |
| Morocco | 1 | 0 | 1 |
| Senegal | 1 | 0 | 1 |
| Total | 156 | 14 | 170 |

== Investigation ==
An investigation commission of the International Civil Aviation Organization determined that a bomb placed in a container in location 13-R in the forward cargo hold caused the destruction of the aircraft. The commission suggested that the most plausible hypothesis was for the bomb to have been inside the baggage loaded at Brazzaville airport. Initial speculation over which groups might have been responsible for destroying UTA Flight 772 centered upon Islamic Jihad, who were quick to claim responsibility for the attack, and the "Secret Chadian Resistance" rebel group, which opposed president Hissène Habré. Five years previously, on 10 March 1984, a bomb destroyed another UTA aircraft from Brazzaville shortly after the DC-8 had landed at N'Djamena airport. There were no fatalities on that occasion and those responsible were never identified.

== Trial in absentia ==
The investigators obtained a confession from one of the alleged terrorists, a Congolese opposition figure, who had helped recruit a fellow dissident to smuggle the bomb onto the aircraft. This confession led to charges being brought against six Libyans. French judge Jean-Louis Bruguière identified them, as follows:

- Abdullah Senussi, brother-in-law of Muammar Gaddafi, and deputy head of Libyan intelligence;
- Abdullah Elazragh, Counsellor at the Libyan embassy in Brazzaville;
- Ibrahim Naeli and Arbas Musbah, explosives experts in the Libyan secret service;
- Issa Shibani, the secret agent who purchased the timer that allegedly triggered the bomb; and,
- Abdelsalam Hammouda, Senussi's right-hand man, who was said to have coordinated the attack.

In 1999, the six Libyans were put on trial in the Paris Assize Court for the bombing of UTA Flight 772. Because Gaddafi would not allow their extradition to France, the six were tried in absentia and were convicted.

On 5 September 2012, the country of Mauritania extradited Abdullah Senussi to Libyan authorities. Senussi was to be tried in Libya for crimes he allegedly committed during the time he was the close assistant to Gaddafi. Senussi appeared in a Libyan court for a pre-trial hearing on 19 September 2013. On 11 October 2013, the International Criminal Court ruled that he can be tried in Libya and lifted their warrant.

=== Alleged motive ===
The motive usually attributed to Libya for the UTA Flight 772 bombing was retaliation against the French for supporting Chad against the expansionist projects of Libya toward Chad.

The Chadian–Libyan War (1978–1987) ended in disaster for Libya following the defeat at the Battle of Maaten al-Sarra in the 1987 Toyota War. Muammar Gaddafi was forced to accede to a ceasefire ending the Chadian–Libyan conflict and his dreams of African and Arab dominance. Gaddafi blamed the defeat on French and United States "aggression against Libya". The result was Gaddafi's lingering animosity against the two countries which led to Libyan support for the bombings of Pan Am Flight 103 and UTA Flight 772.

== Libyan compensation ==
The Paris court awarded the families of the UTA victims sums ranging from €3,000 to €30,000 depending on their relationship to the dead. Not content with this award, the French relatives' group "UTA DC10 Families" (French: Les Familles du DC10 d'UTA) signed an agreement on 9 January 2004 with the Gaddafi International Foundation for Charity Associations accepting a compensation payment of US$170 million, or $1 million for each of the 170 UTA victims. By May 2007, it was reported that 95% of this compensation money had been distributed. However, the families of the seven American victims refused to accept their US$1 million awards and began pursuing the Libyan government through a federal court in Washington.

On 19 September 2006, the court was asked to rule that the Libyan government and six of its agents were guilty of the destruction of UTA Flight 772 on 19 September 1989. Damages of more than US$2 billion were claimed for the loss of life and the destruction of the DC-10 jet.

In April 2007, D.C. District Judge Henry H. Kennedy found Libya directly responsible for the bombing and presided over a three-day bench trial from 13 August 2007 to 15 August 2007. On 15 January 2008, Judge Kennedy issued an order awarding US$6 billion in damages to the families and owners of the airliner; Libya appealed this decision.

In October 2008, Libya paid $1.5 billion into a fund to be used to compensate relatives of the:

1. Lockerbie bombing victims;
2. American victims of the 1986 Berlin discotheque bombing;
3. American victims of the 1989 UTA Flight 772 bombing; and,
4. Libyan victims of the 1986 US bombing of Tripoli and Benghazi.

In response U.S. president George W. Bush signed an executive order dismissing all of the pending compensation cases in the U.S. and restoring the Libyan government's immunity from terror-related lawsuits.

== Other statements ==
In Manipulations Africaines (African Manipulations), published in February 2001, Pierre Péan investigated the sabotage of UTA Flight 772. He alleged that evidence pointed to Iran and Syria (acting through the Hezbollah movement), but that due to political context (notably the Gulf War), France and the United States tried to put the blame on Libya. He accuses judge Jean-Louis Bruguière of deliberately neglecting proof of Lebanon, Syria and Iran being involved to pursue only the Libyan trail. He also accused Thomas Thurman, a Federal Bureau of Investigation explosives expert, of fabricating false evidence against Libya in both the Pan Am Flight 103 and UTA Flight 772 sabotages.

On 18 July 2011, former Libyan foreign minister Abdel Rahman Shalgham, who had defected from the Libyan government in March at the beginning of what would become the 2011 Libyan civil war, told al-Hayat that the Libyan government was responsible for the bombing of UTA Flight 772. He stated "The Libyan security services blew up the plane. They believed that opposition leader Mohammed al-Megrief was on board, but after the plane was blown up, it was found that he was not on the plane." He also claimed that "The Lockerbie operation was more complex ... the role of states and organizations has been discussed, and while the Libyan services were implicated, I do not think it was a purely Libyan operation."

== Memorials ==
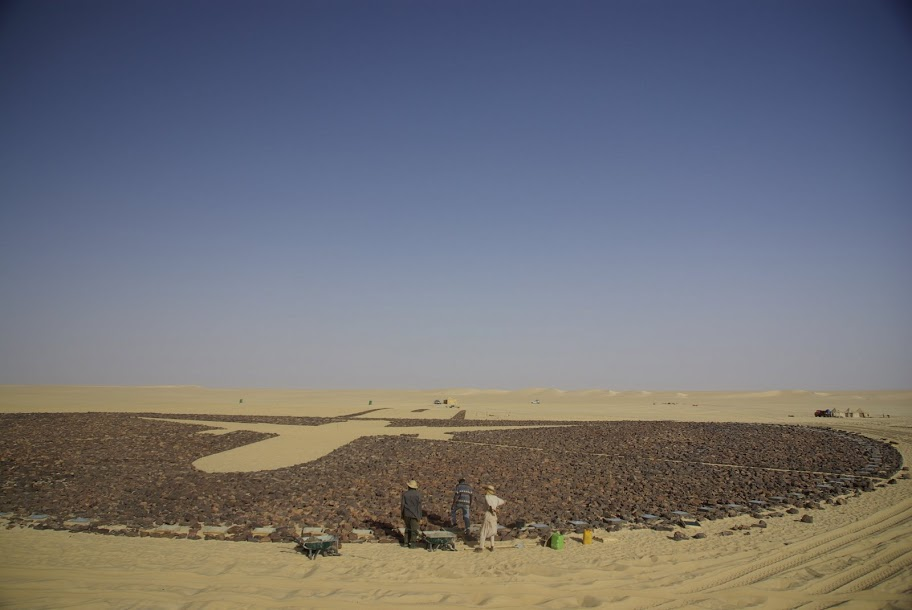
UTA Flight 772 Memorial in the Niger desert

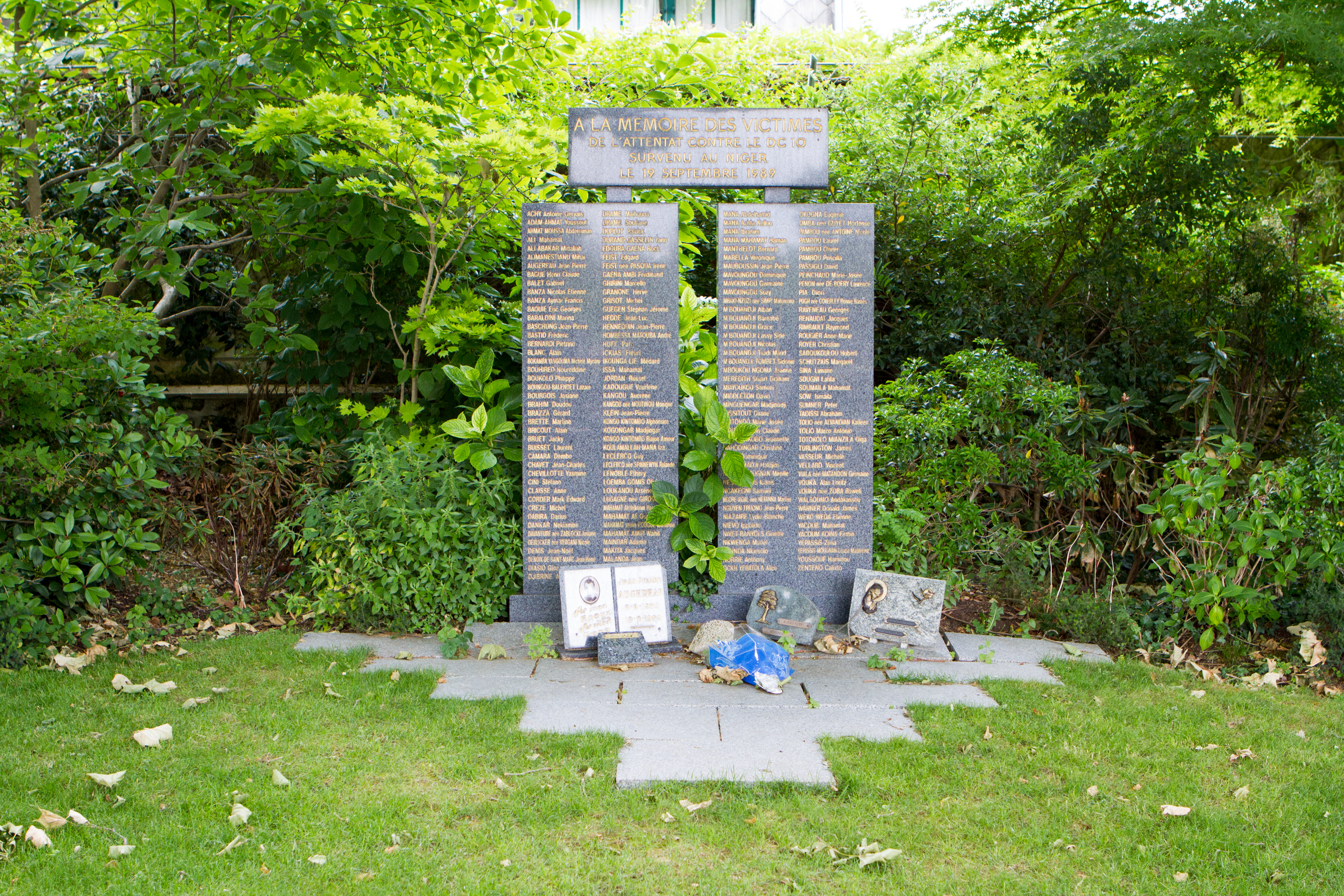
Memorial at the Père-Lachaise cemetery, Paris, France

There are memorials to the victims of UTA Flight 772 in Brazzaville and N'Djamena and a cenotaph at Père-Lachaise cemetery in Paris. In addition, at the crash site, where debris remained in the desert, Exxon employees prospecting for oil in the region raised the aircraft's starboard wing with an attached plaque as a memorial to their three colleagues killed in the explosion and crash, but the wing was not well anchored and fell.

In May and June 2007, Les Familles de l'Attentat du DC-10 d'UTA (French for 'the families of the attack on the UTA DC-10'), an association of the victims' families, created a memorial in the Niger desert, organized by Frenchman Guillaume Denoix de Saint Marc, whose father, Jean-Henri, died on the flight. The memorial is about 6 kilometres (3.7 mi; 3.2 nmi) away from the main crash site, at 16°51′53.748″N 11°57′13.362″E, and was intended to be seen from planes following the same air route as Flight 772. It consists of the silhouette of a DC-10 left bare within a compass rose 80 metres (260 ft) in diameter made of dark rocks that were transported to the site, with 170 broken mirrors around the perimeter representing the 170 victims; at the north compass point, the starboard wing brought from the crash site stands upbright bearing a plaque listing their names.

The memorial was visible in aerial imagery on Google maps. In December 2023, it was reported to have been vandalized and destroyed; the French newspaper Le Canard enchaîné attributed the action to the Russian Wagner Group.

== In popular culture ==
Rush drummer Neil Peart mentioned this incident at length in his travel memoir, The Masked Rider: Cycling in West Africa, as he had taken this flight less than a year prior to the incident from N'Djamena to Paris once he was finished with his Cameroon bicycling tour.

A book by Stu Newburger called The Forgotten Flight: Terrorism, Diplomacy and the Pursuit of Justice is about the crash.

== Maps ==
Location of the accident and the airports

== See also ==
- Libyan financing in the 2007 French presidential election
- Air India Flight 182
- Pan Am Flight 73
- Pan Am Flight 103
- Pierre Péan
- Libya and state-sponsored terrorism
