= 1979 in Libya =

- Decades: 1950s; 1960s; 1970s; 1980s; 1990s
- See also: Other events of 1979; List of years in Libya

The following lists events that happened in 1979 in Libya.

== Incumbents ==
- Prime Minister: Abdul Ati al-Obeidi (until 2 March), Jadallah Azzuz at-Talhi (starting 2 March)

== Events ==
=== March ===
- the General People's Congress declares that the "vesting of power in the masses" and the "separation of the state from the revolution" is complete. The government is divided between the "Jamahiriya sector" and the "revolutionary sector". The "Jamahiriya sector" is composed of the General People's Congress, the General People's Committee, and the local Basic People's Congresses. Muammar Gaddafi relinquishes his position as general secretary of the General People's Congress, as which he was succeeded by Abdul Ati al-Obeidi, but remains supreme commander of the armed forces. The "Jamahiriya sector" is overseen by the "revolutionary sector", headed by Gaddafi as "Leader of the Revolution" .

=== June ===
- 26 June - 2,500 Libyan troops invade Chad, heading for Faya-Largeau. The Libyans are forced to retreat by the intervention of French airplanes.

=== December ===
- 2 December - The U.S. Embassy in Tripoli is burned during protests.
