= 1984 in Libya =

- Decades: 1960s; 1970s; 1980s; 1990s; 2000s
- See also: Other events of 1984; List of years in Libya

The following lists events that happened during 1984 in Libya.

== Incumbents ==
- Prime Minister: Jadallah Azzuz at-Talhi (until 16 February), Muhammad az-Zaruq Rajab (starting 16 February)

== Events ==
=== March ===
- Four Libyan nationals are arrested in London on charges following explosions at Manchester and Heathrow airports. Diplomatic relations between Britain and Libya were broken. Four British are taken hostage in retaliation.

=== April ===
- 30 April - Muammar Gaddafi proposes a mutual withdrawal of both French and Libyan forces from Chad, ending Operation Manta. The offer was accepted, and four months later, Mitterrand and Gaddafi announced that the troop withdrawal would start on September 25, and be completed by November 10.

=== June ===
- 5 June - Al-Sadek Hamed Al-Shuwehdy, a Libyan engineer, is publicly executed in a Benghazi basketball stadium after a show trial. Huda Ben Amer, a Gaddafi loyalist and later mayor of Benghazi, becomes known as "Huda the executioner" after rushing in to aid in the execution.

=== August ===
- 13 August - The Oujda Treaty is signed, in Oujda, Morocco. It aims to establish the "Arab-African Union of States" between Libya and Morocco. Morocco will end up cancelling the treaty two years later, before any union is actually established.
- 28 August - Gaddafi lays the foundation stone in Sarir area for the commencement of the construction of the Great Man-Made River Project.
