= 1990 in Libya =

- Decades: 1970s; 1980s; 1990s; 2000s; 2010s
- See also: Other events of 1990; List of years in Libya

The following lists events that happened in 1990 in Libya.

== Incumbents ==
- President: Muammar al-Gaddafi
- Prime Minister: Umar Mustafa al-Muntasir (until 7 October), Abuzed Omar Dorda (starting 7 October)

== Events ==
- June 24 - Jordan re-opens diplomatic relations with Libya. Jordan had cut off relations in 1984 after a violent protest at the Jordanian embassy in Tripoli.

== Births ==
- 4 June - Faisal Al Badri, football player for the Libyan national squad.
- 12 July - Abdulaziz Belraysh, football player for the Libyan national squad.
