= 1987 in Libya =

- Decades: 1960s; 1970s; 1980s; 1990s; 2000s
- See also: Other events of 1987; List of years in Libya

The following lists events that happened in 1987 in Libya.

== Incumbents ==
- Prime Minister: Jadallah Azzuz at-Talhi (until 1 March), Umar Mustafa al-Muntasir (starting 1 March)

== Events ==
- July - Air travel and telephone links are re-established between Tunisia and Libya after being paused since 1985.
- September - Iraq and Libya re-establish diplomatic relations.
- September 11 - Chad and Libya agree to a ceasefire that ends the Chadian–Libyan War.
- October 7 - Algeria and Libya announce a tentative agreement to form a political union. Algeria backed out of the planned union in November, well before it was implemented.

== Sport ==
- 1987 Libyan Premier League.
