= 1988 in Libya =

- Decades: 1960s; 1970s; 1980s; 1990s; 2000s
- See also: Other events of 1988; List of years in Libya

The following lists events that happened in 1988 in Libya.

== Incumbents ==
- President: Muammar al-Gaddafi
- Prime Minister: Umar Mustafa al-Muntasir

== Events ==
- October 3 - Chad and Libya reestablish diplomatic relations after the years-long Chadian–Libyan War.
- December 21 - Pan Am Flight 103 is blown up over Lockerbie, Scotland, killing a total of 270 people. Abdelbaset al-Megrahi, a Libyan intelligence officer, was convicted of the bombing in 2001. Libyan refusal to extradite al-Megrahi for a trial was a major contributor to UN sanctions on the country throughout the 1990s.

== Births ==
- 15 June - Muhammad Nashnoush.
- 27 September - Mohamed Suleiman.
- 27 September - Osama Chtiba.
