= Elimination of Libya's WMD programs =

Process since 2003 eliminating weapons of mass destruction

A map of Libya (Libya is in dark green).

In 2003, Libyan leader Muammar Gaddafi agreed to eliminate his country's weapons of mass destruction program, including its nascent nuclear weapons program. Mohamed ElBaradei, head of the International Atomic Energy Agency, said Libya's nuclear program was "in the very initial stages of development" at the time.

In 1968, Libya signed the Nuclear Non-Proliferation Treaty (NPT), ratified the treaty in 1975, and concluded a safeguards agreement in 1980. Despite its NPT obligations, there are reports indicating that Gaddafi either made unsuccessful attempts to build or entered in an agreement to purchase a nuclear weapon from nuclear-armed nations. In the 1970s–80s, Gaddafi made numerous attempts to accelerate and push forward his ambitions for an active nuclear weapons program, using the nuclear black market sources. However, after the end of the Cold War in 1991, Gaddafi sought to resolve its nuclear crises with the United States aiming to uplift the sanctions against Libya, finally agreeing to authorize rolling back Libya's weapons of mass destruction program on 19 December 2003.

As of 2013, over 800 tons of chemical weapons ingredients remained to be destroyed. In February 2014, the new Libyan government announced that it had finished destroying Libya's entire remaining Gaddafi-era stockpile of chemical weapons. Full destruction of chemical weapons ingredients was scheduled to be completed by 2016.

== Precursor events ==
According to Clinton administration diplomat Martin Indyk, Muammar Gaddafi sought more respectability as early as the start of Bill Clinton's Presidency, in the early 1990s. According to an article written by Indyk in 2004, by the 1990s, Gaddafi gave up on supporting various Pan-Arab and African movements and instead began focusing on getting sanctions against Libya removed. Indyk stated that Gaddafi offered to give up his weapons of mass destruction (WMD) and open his facilities to inspection in 1999 in (then-)secret talks with the Bill Clinton administration. According to Gaddafi's former Foreign Minister, Abdel Rahman Shalgham, the event which ultimately caused Gaddafi to give up his WMD and nuclear weapons program was a reported 2001 message from U.S. President George W. Bush which told Gaddafi that “either you get rid of your weapons of mass destruction or [the United States] will personally destroy them and destroy everything with no discussion.” Libyan officials began to meet covertly with British, Russian, and U.S. officials to officially dismantle the program. In March 2003, days before the invasion of Iraq, Gaddafi's personal envoys contacted U.S. President George W. Bush, Russian President Vladimir Putin, and British Prime Minister Tony Blair about Libya's willingness to dismantle its nuclear program. Subsequently, at Gaddafi's direction, Libyan officials provided British, Russian, and U.S. diplomats with documentation and additional details on Libya's chemical, biological, nuclear, and ballistic missile activities. Libya reportedly allowed Russian, U.S., and British officials to visit 10 previously secret sites and dozens of Libyan laboratories and military factories to search for evidence of nuclear fuel cycle-related activities, and for chemical and missile programs.

In October 2003, U.S. intelligence agencies raided a cargo ship and seized a consignment of centrifuge-related equipment bound for Libya in a northern Mediterranean port. The U.S. investigations revealed that many of these components were manufactured by a Scomi Precision Engineering facility in Malaysia and were produced under the technical guidance of Dr. A.Q. Khan and various nationals from the United Kingdom, Germany and Switzerland. After the news became public, Libyan nuclear ambitions were cooled and demoralized.

== Disarmament ==
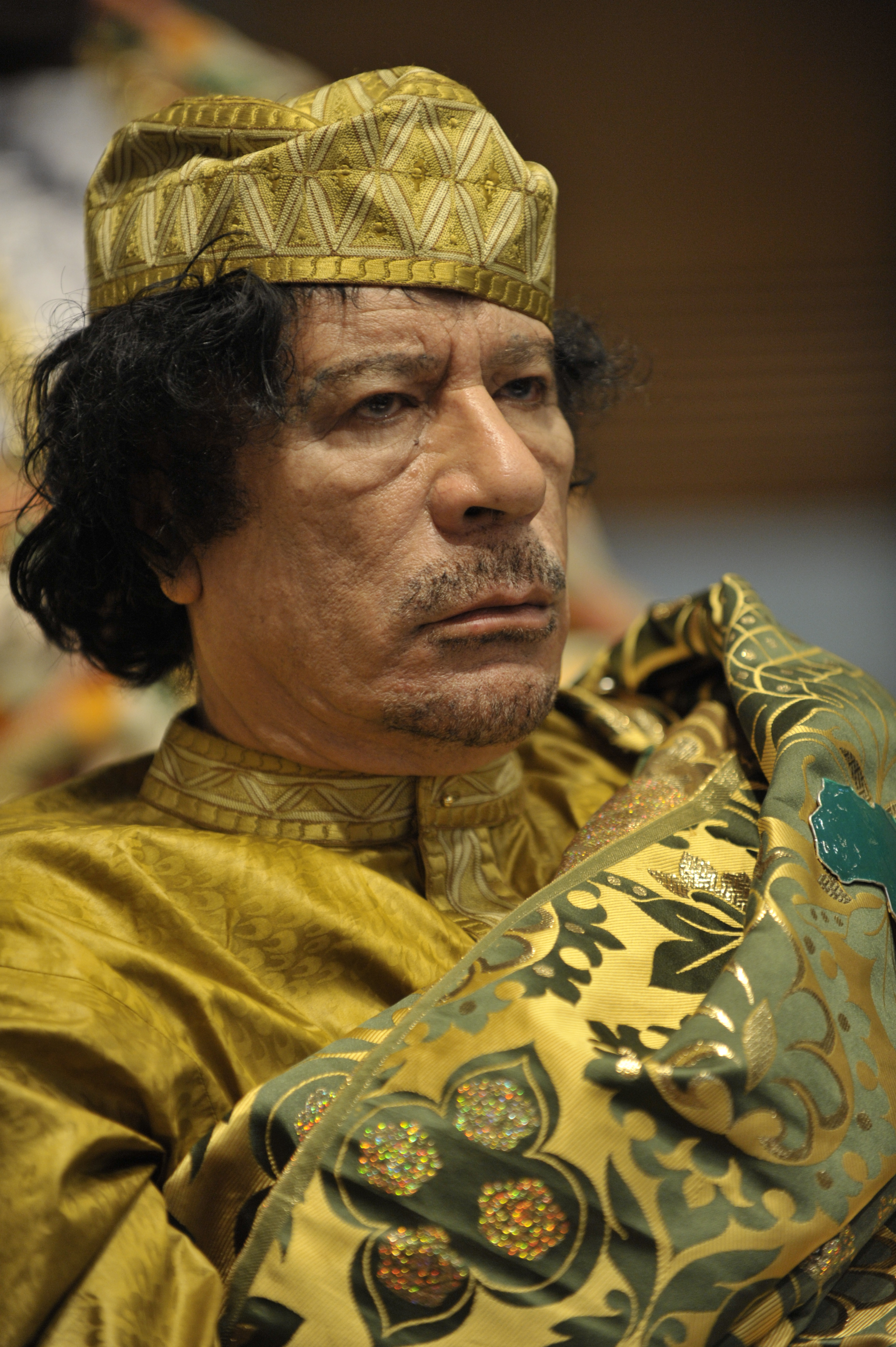
Libyan leader Muammar Gaddafi (lived c. 1942–2011, ruled 1969–2011)

The 2001 September 11 attacks in the United States were denounced by Libyan leader Muammar Gaddafi. Following the U.S. military response in the War in Afghanistan and Iraq War, Gaddafi increasingly sought to normalize relations with the United States, initially focusing on the lifting of U.S. sanctions on Libya. On 19 December 2003, Gaddafi made a surprise announcement of his intention to dismantle Libya's WMD programs. The Libyan Ministry of Foreign Affairs officials were quoted "Libya had bought nuclear components from various black market dealers", and provided the various designs of centrifuges to U.S. officials and gave the name of its suppliers.

Among the list of suppliers included the revealing role of A.Q. Khan, a notable and famed scientist of Pakistan. Events in Libya led to the debriefing of A.Q. Khan in 2004 by the Government of Pakistan while the United States, aided by IAEA and Interpol, apprehended the former Libyan nuclear program's head and Swiss, Friedrich Tinner in Switzerland. On 22 January 2004, U.S. military transport planes carried around 55,000 pounds (25,000 kg) of documents and equipment related to Libya's nuclear and ballistic missile programs to the Oak Ridge National Laboratory (ORNL) in Tennessee. In March 2004, over 1,000 additional centrifuge and missile parts were shipped out of Libya.

At the time of Libya's nuclear disarmament, its nuclear program was in the very initial stages of development. The Director-General of the IAEA Mohamed ElBaradei stated to the media that it was his "gut feeling" that Libya was three to seven years from successfully building a nuclear weapon.

== Aftermath ==
Libya's decision was praised by many in the West but criticized by many in the Arab world. In 2004, Paula DeSutter, the-then United States Assistant Secretary of State for Verification and Compliance stated that “we want to have lessons learned from [Libya's disarmament] because we want Libya to be a model for other countries.” Some prominent politicians and diplomats hoped that Iran, North Korea, and Syria would decide to follow the Libyan model of disarmament. Gaddafi stated that the West asked him on several occasions to advise Iran and North Korea to give up their nuclear weapons programs. In contrast, many participants on Al Jazeera TV criticized Gaddafi for agreeing to disarm just days after Gaddafi made his decision. Gaddafi was criticized by some Arabs for giving Israel a stronger strategic edge in the region, giving legitimacy to the U.S. doctrine of preemptive war, and for not getting security concessions for Libya and the Arab world in exchange for his disarmament.

In response, the Libyan government and its supporters stated that Libya returned to the international community, got a temporary United Nations Security Council seat, and saved some money due to it giving up its nuclear weapons program. Likewise, in an Al-Sharq al-Awsat interview, Gaddafi's son Saif al-Islam stated that the United States did offer security guarantees for Libya in exchange for dismantling its nuclear program and that he expected military and security cooperation agreements with the U.S. in the future.

Eventually Gaddafi grew disillusioned with the things that the West offered Libya. He considered it too small of a reward for Libya for giving up its nuclear weapons program. Gaddafi was also dissatisfied at the United States' slowness in normalizing relations with Libya and in pressuring Israel to denuclearize. According to Gaddafi's son Saif, this was one of the main reasons why Gaddafi temporarily suspended shipping Libya's enriched uranium abroad in 2009 like he promised he would in 2003. Gaddafi wanted to use the remains of his nuclear weapons program to gain more leverage.

As of September 2013, 1.6 metric tons of mustard blister agent loaded in artillery rounds, 2.5 metric tons of congealed mustard agent, and 846 metric tons of chemical weapons ingredients remained to be destroyed. According to The New York Times, in February 2014, the remnants of Libya's chemical weapons had been discreetly destroyed by the United States and Libya, using a transportable oven technology to destroy hundreds of bombs and artillery rounds filled with deadly mustard agent.

Libya signed the Treaty on the Prohibition of Nuclear Weapons on 20 September 2017, but has not yet ratified it.

In May 2018, North Korean Deputy Foreign Minister Kim Kye-gwan rejected an assertion by U.S. National Security Advisor John Bolton that North Korean denuclearization should follow the Libyan disarmament model.

== Arab Spring and NATO intervention ==
During the 2011 NATO intervention in Libya, Gaddafi tried using Libya's voluntary disarmament to convince NATO to cease its Libya operations. At the same time, Gaddafi's son Saif and others in the Libyan government expressed their regret about Libya's previous disarmament. It was speculated in the media (especially in the Middle Eastern media) that NATO's 2011 intervention in Libya (which led to Gaddafi's overthrow and killing at the hands of anti-Gaddafi forces) would make Iran, North Korea, and possibly other countries more reluctant to give up their nuclear programs and/or nuclear weapons due to the risk of being weakened and/or double-crossed as a result.

On 22 September 2011, near Sabha, Libya, toward the end of the Libyan Civil War, anti-Gaddafi forces discovered two warehouses containing thousands of blue barrels marked with tape reading "radioactive" and plastic bags of yellow powder sealed with the same tape. The IAEA stated, "We can confirm that there is yellowcake stored in drums at a site near Sabha ... which Libya previously declared to the IAEA. [...] The IAEA has tentatively scheduled safeguards activities at this location once the situation in the country stabilises."

== See also ==
- Disarmament of Iraq
- Nuclear club
- Nuclear nonproliferation
