= Koussa =

Koussa could mean:

- 23070 Koussa, 23070 Koussa is a main belt asteroid with an orbital period of 2040.8963889 days (5.59 years).
- Moussa Koussa, a Libyan political figure and diplomat, who served in the Libyan government as Minister of Foreign Affairs from March 2009.
