= 1986 in Libya =

- Decades: 1960s; 1970s; 1980s; 1990s; 2000s
- See also: Other events of 1986; List of years in Libya

The following lists events that happened during 1986 in Libya.

== Incumbents ==
- Prime Minister: Muhammad az-Zaruq Rajab (until 3 March), Jadallah Azzuz at-Talhi (starting 3 March)

== Events ==
=== March ===
- 23 March - The Gulf of Sidra Incident.

=== April ===
- 15 April - U.S. aircraft bombs airfields and barracks within Libya.
- After the bombing the country was renamed Great Socialist People's Libyan Arab Jamahiriya.
- Gaddafi announces plans for a unified African gold dinar currency, to challenge the dominance of the US Dollar and Euro currencies. The African dinar would have been measured directly in terms of gold.
