= 1989 in Libya =

- Decades: 1960s; 1970s; 1980s; 1990s; 2000s
- See also: Other events of 1989; List of years in Libya

The following lists events that happened in 1989 in Libya.

== Incumbents ==
- President: Muammar al-Gaddafi
- Prime minister: Umar Mustafa al-Muntasir

== Events ==
- July 27 - Korean Air Flight 803 crashes on approach to Tripoli International Airport, 74 of the 199 people on board the plane were killed, as well as six people on ground.
- September 19 - UTA Flight 772 is blown up over Niger, killing all 170 passengers and crew on board. Libya was accused of involvement in the bombing, and later compensated the victims' families, although Libya did not accept responsibility.
- October 17 - Egypt and Libya re-establish diplomatic relations that had been cut off in 1977.

== Births ==
- 20 March - Mohammad Za'abia.
- 21 April - Ahmed Krawa'a.
- 5 May - Ghada Ali.
- 3 November - Hamed Snousi.
- 15 December - Marwan Mabrouk.
