= Libya–Mexico relations =

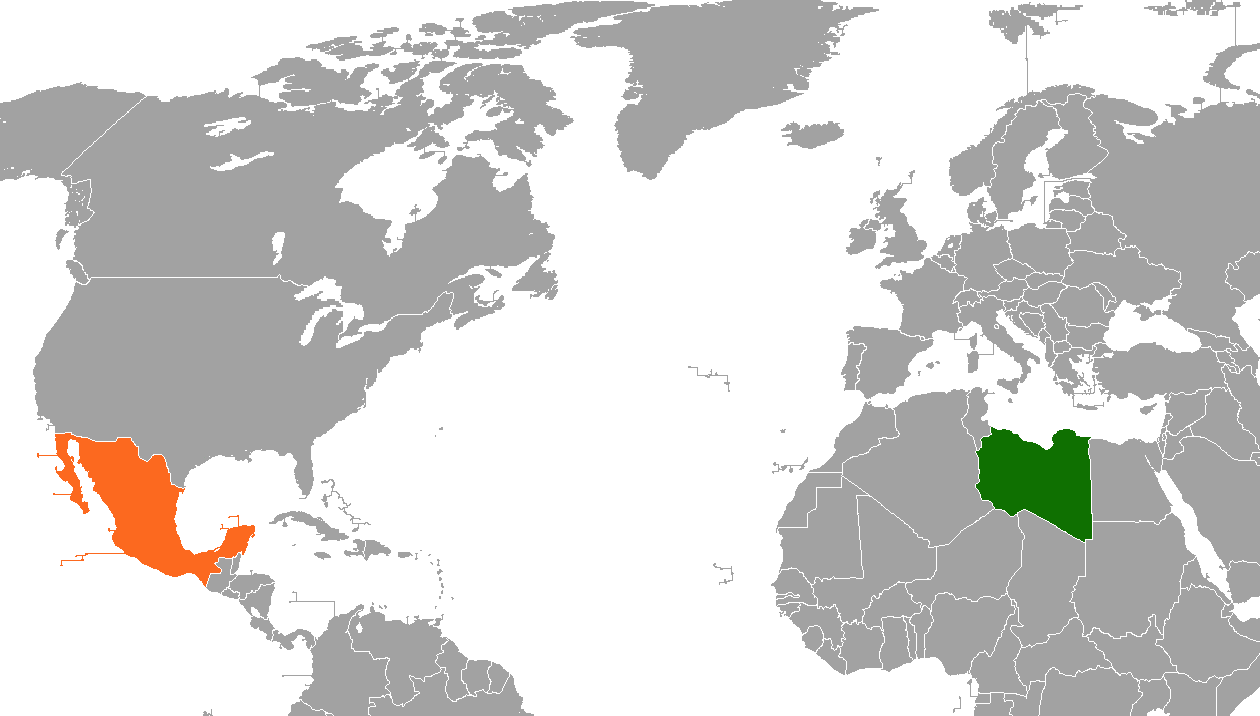

- Libya: Mexico

Diplomatic mission
- Embassy of Libya, Mexico City: Embassy of Mexico, Algiers

Envoy
- Ambassador Sana El Mansouri: Ambassador José Ignacio Madrazo

The nations of Libya and Mexico established diplomatic relations in 1975. Both nations are members of the United Nations.

== History ==
In 1947, Libya obtained its independence from Italy. In 1961, Mexican President Adolfo López Mateos sent a presidential delegation of goodwill, led by Special Envoy Alejandro Carrillo Marcor and Delegate José Ezequiel Iturriaga, to visit Libya to pave the way for establishing diplomatic relations between the two nations. On 6 August 1975, Libya and Mexico established diplomatic relations. Initial relations between both nations were limited and took place in mainly multilateral organizations such as at the United Nations. In January 2008, Libya opened a resident embassy in Mexico City.

In April 2008, Libyan Foreign Minister Abdel Rahman Shalgham paid an official visit to Mexico and met with Mexican Foreign Secretary Patricia Espinosa. Foreign Minister Shalgham visit was the first high-level visit to Mexico by a Libyan representative. During the visit, both Foreign Ministers discussed evaluating the state of the bilateral relationship between both nations and highlighted the perspectives for its strengthening through political dialogue and economic, commercial, cultural and educational cooperation. Furthermore, they jointly stressed the importance of promoting bilateral cooperation in specific areas such as water resources, the preservation of archaeological sites and desertification, as well as in the exchange of experiences in migratory and consular matters.

In June 2009, Mexican ambassador resident in Addis Ababa, Ethiopia participated in the 13th African Union summit held in Sirte, Libya. In August 2009, Mexican Director General for Africa and Middle East, Sara Valdés, paid a visit to Tripoli to celebrate the first consultation of mutual issues between both nations.

In February 2011, Libya experienced its first civil war. During the war, Mexico evacuated its citizens from the country. In July 2011, Mexican authorities foiled a plan to smuggle former Colonel Gaddafi's son, Al-Saadi Gaddafi, and other Gaddafi family members into Mexico.

In 2013, the Mexican Chamber of Deputies established a Mexico-Libya Friendship Group. The group meets a few times over the years, and again in November 2023 to strengthen diplomatic relations between both nations.

== High-level visits ==
High-level visit from Libya to Mexico

- Foreign Minister Abdel Rahman Shalgham (2008)

High-level visit from Mexico to Libya

- Special Envoy Alejandro Carrillo Marcor (1961)
- Delegate José Ezequiel Iturriaga (1961)
- Director General for Africa and Middle East Sara Valdés (2009)

== Agreements and scholarships ==
Both nations have signed a Memorandum of Understanding between the Mexican Secretariat of Foreign Affairs and the Libyan Ministry of Foreign Affairs for the establishment of a Consultation Mechanism on Issues of Mutual Interest (2008).

Each year, the Mexican government offers scholarships for students from Libya who wish to pursue a master's or doctorate degree at a Mexican university.

== Trade ==
In 2023, trade between Libya and Mexico totaled US$11.2 million. Libya's main exports to Mexico are minerals or chemical nitrogenados. Mexico's main exports to Libya include: motor cars and other vehicles for the transport of goods or people, electronics and household appliances, dried vegetables, and medical based products.

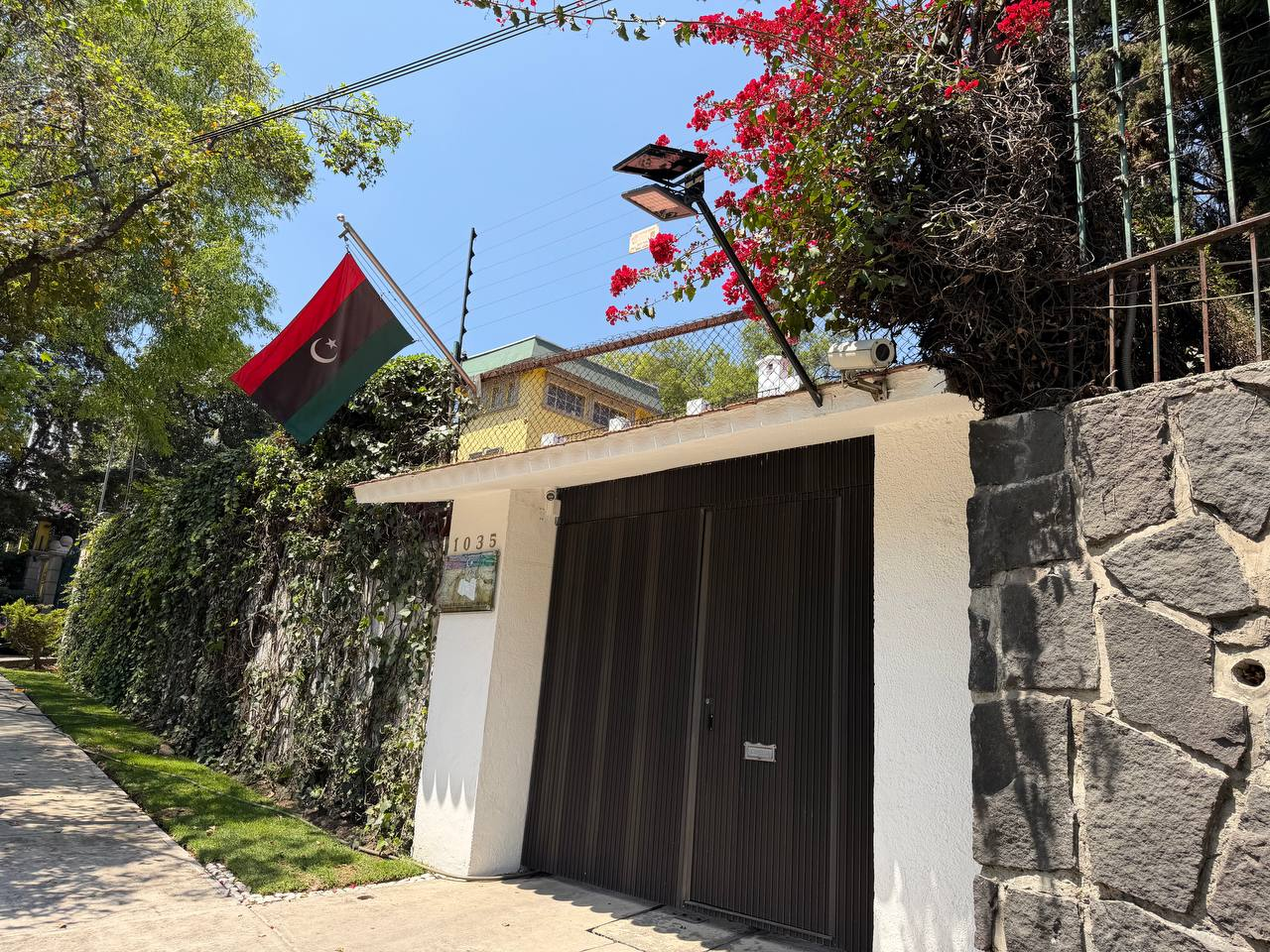
Embassy of Libya in Mexico City

== Diplomatic missions ==
- Libya has an embassy in Mexico City.
- Mexico is accredited to Libya from its embassy in Algiers, Algeria.

== See also ==
- Foreign relations of Libya
- Foreign relations of Mexico
