= 1978 in Libya =

- Decades: 1950s; 1960s; 1970s; 1980s; 1990s
- See also: Other events of 1978; List of years in Libya

The following lists events that happened in 1978 in Libya.

== Incumbents ==
- President: Muammar al-Gaddafi
- Prime Minister: Abdul Ati al-Obeidi
- The Chadian–Libyan War was a series of military campaigns in Chad between 1978 and 1987, fought between Libyan and allied Chadian forces against Chadian groups supported by France, with the occasional involvement of other foreign countries and factions. Libya had been involved in Chad's internal affairs prior to 1978 and before Muammar Gaddafi's rise to power in Libya in 1969, beginning with the extension of the Chadian Civil War to northern Chad in 1968. The conflict was marked by a series of four separate Libyan interventions in Chad, taking place in 1978, 1979, 1980–1981 and 1983–1987. On all of these occasions, Gaddafi had the support of a number of factions participating in the civil war, while Libya's opponents found the support of the French government, which intervened militarily to support the Chadian government in 1978, 1983 and 1986. The pattern of the war delineated itself in 1978, with the Libyans providing armour, artillery and air support and their Chadian allies the infantry, which assumed the bulk of the scouting and fighting. This pattern was radically changed in 1986, towards the end of the war, when most Chadian forces united in opposing the Libyan occupation of northern Chad with a degree of unity that had never been seen before in Chad. This deprived the Libyan forces of their habitual infantry, exactly when they found themselves confronting a mobile army, well provided now by the United States, Zaire and France with anti-tank and anti-air missiles, thus cancelling the Libyan superiority in firepower. What followed was the Toyota War, in which the Libyan forces were routed and expelled from Chad, putting an end to the conflict. Gaddafi initially intended to annex the Aouzou Strip, the northernmost part of Chad, which he claimed as part of Libya on the grounds of an unratified treaty of the colonial period. In 1972 his goals became, in the evaluation of historian Mario Azevedo, the creation of a client state in Libya's "underbelly", an Islamic republic modelled after his Jamahiriya, that would maintain close ties with Libya, and secure his control over the Aouzou Strip; expulsion of the French from the region; and use of Chad as a base to expand his influence in Central Africa.

== Events ==
=== January ===
- 29 January. Libyan ground units attacks government forces in northern Chad: Faya-Largeau, Fada and Ounianga Kebir in support of rebels. The attacks were successful, and Libya assumed temporary control of the BET Prefecture, and control of the Aouzou Strip ending in 1987.

=== July ===
- Libya and India signs a memorandum of understanding to cooperate in peaceful applications of nuclear energy as part of India's Atom of Peace policy.

=== October ===
- Libyan troops are sent to aid Idi Amin in the Uganda–Tanzania War when Amin tried to annex the northern Tanzanian province of Kagera, and Tanzania counterattacked. Amin lost the battle and later fled to exile in Libya, where he remained for almost a year.
