= 1977 in Libya =

- Decades: 1950s; 1960s; 1970s; 1980s; 1990s
- See also: Other events of 1977; List of years in Libya

The following lists events that happened in 1977 in Libya.

== Incumbents ==
- Brotherly Leader and Guide of the Revolution: Muammar Gaddafi
- Prime Minister:
- Abdessalam Jalloud (until 2 March)
- Abdul Ati al-Obeidi (starting 2 March)

== Events ==
=== March ===
- 1 March – Abdul Ati al-Obeidi is appointed General Secretary of the General People's Committee.
- 2 March – Following the Libyan Revolution of 1969 against King Idris of Libya on 1 September 1969, Muammar Gaddafi published The Green Book in 1975 to outline his Third Universal Theory.

=== April ===
- Demonstrators attack Egypt's embassy.

=== June ===
- Libyan protesters begin a "March on Cairo" as they heads towards the Egyptian border. The Libyans wanted to demonstrate against the increasing likelihood that Egypt would enter into a peace treaty with Israel.

=== July ===
- 21 July – gun battles between Egyptian and Libyan forces on the border, followed by land and air strikes
- 24 July – armistice. Libyan casualties were 400 dead or wounded, while Egyptian casualties were roughly 100 dead.

=== August ===
- An agreement to exchange prisoners of war leads to a relaxation of tension between the two states

=== November ===
- Libya officially leaves the Federation of Arab Republics

=== December ===
- 2 december 1977 – a Tupolev Tu-154 runs out of fuel near Benghazi. A total of 59 passengers are killed in the crash.
- 1977–78 Libyan Premier League
