= 1980 in Libya =

- Decades: 1960s; 1970s; 1980s; 1990s; 2000s
- See also: Other events of 1980; List of years in Libya

The following lists events that happened during 1980 in Libya.

== Incumbents ==
- Prime Minister: Jadallah Azzuz at-Talhi

== Events ==
- April 15 – Libya recognizes the Sahrawi Arab Democratic Republic.
- August – A tribal uprising in eastern Libya triggers five days of fighting.
