= 2011 in Libya =

- Decades: 1990s; 2000s; 2010s; 2020s
- See also: Other events of 2011; List of years in Libya

The following lists events that happened during 2011 in Libya.

== Incumbents ==
- President: Muammar al-Gaddafi (until October 20)
- Prime Minister: Baghdadi Mahmudi (until August 23)

== Events ==
=== February ===
- February 16 – Fourteen people are hurt in clashes between Libyan protesters and security forces in Benghazi as protests spread.
- February 17 – 2011 Libyan Civil War
  - 14 anti-government protesters are killed as Libyan protesters seeking to oust president Muammar Gaddafi defy a crackdown and take to the streets in four cities on what they called a "day of rage".
  - Social networking sites mobilize for protests on a "day of anger" in Libya.
- February 18 – 2011 Libyan Civil War
  - Anti-regime protests continue overnight after yesterday's "Day of Rage". Funerals of those killed due today. Human Rights Watch lists 24 killed and many wounded.
  - Libyans in Benghazi take over a radio station; it broadcasts its message to the world - calling on the international media to cover what "the criminal Gaddafi" is doing - while libya17.com posts videos in English.
  - Libya shuts off access to the Internet, as a result, causing Al Jazeera to have lost its signal to Libya.
- February 19 - 2011 Libyan Civil War
  - Human Rights Watch claims that Libyan security forces have killed 84 people over the past three days.
  - Libyan exiles claim that the total death toll could be as high as 120 with reports that snipers have fired at funerals in Benghazi.
  - A businessman calls for help from Benghazi, saying hospitals are overwhelmed and blood is running out.
- February 20 - 2011 Libyan Civil War
  - More than 200 people are killed and 900 other are injured as military troops attack protesters.
  - Members of a Libyan Army unit defect and claim to have "liberated" Benghazi.
  - Shaikh Faraj al Zuway, the head of the Zuwayya tribe in eastern Libya, threatens to cut off oil exports unless the Government of Libya stops the "suppression of protestors".
  - Al Jazeera reports that the protests have spread to the capital Tripoli.
- February 21 - 2011 Libyan Civil War
  - The Libyan Air Force launches airstrikes on crowds of protesters. Two civilian helicopters carrying French nationals and two Libyan Mirage jets land in Malta. The Libyan pilots claim that they received orders to bomb protesters, and request political asylum.
  - Saif al-Islam Gaddafi, a son of Libyan leader Muammar Gaddafi, warns in a nationally televised address that the protests could develop into a civil war.
  - UAE-based Al Arabiya and Qatar-based Al Jazeera reported earlier that Colonel Muammar Gaddafi, head of Libya, has left for Brazil or Venezuela.
  - Libya's representatives to the Arab League, China, India and other countries resign in protest at the violence.
  - Clashes and gunfire are reported in Tripoli for the first time.
  - Yusuf al-Qaradawi, an influential Muslim cleric and the spiritual leader of Egypt's Muslim Brotherhood, issues a fatwa ordering the death of the Libyan leader Muammar Gaddafi.
  - Islamic leaders and clerics in Libya urge all Muslims to rebel against Gaddafi.
  - Hillary Clinton calls on Libyan authorities to "stop this unacceptable bloodshed".
- February 22 – 2011 Libyan Civil War
  - The leader of Libya Muammar Gaddafi appears on state television to disprove claims that he has fled.
  - The runways at Benina International Airport in Benghazi have been destroyed.
  - The United Nations Security Council holds a closed-door meeting in response to the crackdown in Libya.
  - Colonel Gaddafi gives a major speech claiming that he will remain head of the revolution.
  - Abdul Fatah Younis, the Libyan Interior Minister and general in the Libyan Army, defects.
  - The old monarchy-era flag, which has become a popular symbol among anti-government protesters, is hoisted at the Libyan embassy in Stockholm, Sweden.
  - Peru suspends diplomatic relations with Libya, becoming the first nation to do so since the unrest, and calls on the United Nations Security Council to introduce a no-fly zone over Libyan airspace to stop Libyan Air Force aircraft attacking civilians.
  - Uncertainty in Libya leads to falls in world stock markets and increases in crude oil prices.
  - Al Jazeera reports Arab League Secretary General Amr Moussa stating that Libya is suspended from sessions.
- February 23 - 2011 Libyan Civil War
  - Italy's foreign minister says as many as 1,000 people have been killed in Libya during the unrest.
  - Anti-government protesters and defectors take control of more cities.
  - The African Union condemns the "excessive use of force" against protesters.
  - Bruno Rodríguez Parrilla, Cuba's Minister of Foreign Affairs, accuses the United States media of inciting violence.
  - More than 5,700 people have fled Libya for Tunisia in the past couple of days.
  - Mustafa Abdul Jalil, the former Libyan Minister for Justice, claims that Libyan dictator Muammar Gaddafi personally authorised the Lockerbie bombing.
  - Nations including the United Kingdom, the United States of America, France, the People's Republic of China, Russia, Italy and Greece evacuate their citizens from Libya.
  - Oil prices reach a two-year high due to uncertainty in the Middle East most notably in Libya.
- February 24 - 2011 Libyan Civil War
  - Libyan workers fleeing to Tunisia claim that anti-Gaddafi forces control the town of Zuwara, 120 km west of Tripoli.
  - More towns and cities closer to Tripoli come under the control of protesters and defectors.
  - At least ten people have been killed and dozens injured following an attack by pro-government forces on the town of Zawiya.
  - Colonel Gaddafi describes himself as a "symbolic leader" similar to Queen Elizabeth II and blames unrest on al-Qaeda.
- February 25 - '2011 Libyan Civil War
  - Leader Muammar Gaddafi addresses a crowd of supporters in the capital Tripoli.
  - More defections take place with a Libyan envoy to the United Nations changing sides during a meeting at the U.N. Human Rights Council in Geneva.
  - The president of the United States, Barack Obama, announces sanctions against the government of Libya as does the European Union.
- February 26 - 2011 Libyan Civil War
  - Internal and international pressure continues on Muammar Gaddafi to stand down from power.
  - Saif al-Islam Gaddafi tells Al-Arabiya television that the unrest in Libya opens up all options including civil war.
  - Reuters reports that a Libyan interim government led by the former justice minister Mustafa Abdul Jalil has been formed in Benghazi.
  - The United Nations Security Council, after the defected Libyan Ambassador to the UN Abdel Rahman Mohamed Shalgam's appeal to act against Muammar Gaddafi's regime escalating violence, being used to crack down the 2011 Libyan civil war, and following propositions by France, Germany, United Kingdom and the United States, adopts resolution 1970. "All necessary means" enforcement of said resolution, and imposition of a "No-fly zone" over Libya are rejected. These measures will be however included on UNSC resolution 1973 of 17 March 2011.
- February 27 - 2011 Libyan Civil War
  - The United Nations Security Council adopts Resolution 1970, imposing sanctions on Muammar Gaddafi's regime.
  - Anti-government forces seize the town of Zawiya, 30 miles west of the capital Tripoli.
- February 28 - 2011 Libyan Civil War
  - Al Jazeera reports that many African migrant workers in Libya have been victims of violence due to suspicions that they are mercenaries for Muammar Gaddafi's regime.
  - France sends two planeloads of aid to opponents of the Libyan regime in Benghazi.
  - Forces loyal to Colonel Gaddafi surround the town of Zawiya as part of a general counterattack.
  - David Cameron, the prime minister of the United Kingdom, announces that he is working on a no-fly zone over Libya.
  - The United States Secretary of State, Hillary Clinton, announces that the United States will be sending assistance teams to Libya's borders with Algeria and Egypt.
  - Muammar Gaddafi tells the BBC that all of his people love him and refuses to acknowledge that there are protests in Tripoli.
  - The United States freezes $30 billion in Libyan assets.
  - The Justice and Equality Movement in Darfur, western Sudan, asks the United Nations to rescue its leader in Libya, after accusations he was supporting mercenary activities in the country.
  - Opposition forces rescue seven rebels 'buried alive' under concrete in a government compound in Benghazi, while close to 100,000 migrant workers flee Libya.

=== March ===
- March 17 - The United Nations Security Council approves a no-fly zone over Libya in response to increasing violence in the country.
- March 18 - U.S. President Barack Obama orders military air strikes against Muammar Gaddafi's forces in Libya in his address to the nation from the White House.
- March 19 - US, French, and British military attacks on Libya begin. More than 100 Tomahawk missiles from the US and UK complement French airstrikes against Gaddafi's forces.

=== October ===
- October 20 - Gaddafi is captured alive after fighting with rebel forces. He is subsequently killed.

== Deaths ==
- Muammar al-Gaddafi
