= Kosovo–Libya relations =

Kosovo-Libya relations
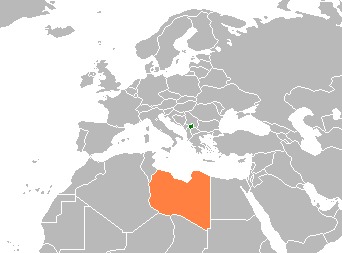

- Kosovo: Libya

Kosovo's declaration of independence from Serbia was enacted on Sunday, 17 February 2008 by a unanimous vote of the Assembly of Kosovo. All 11 representatives of the Serb minority boycotted the proceedings. International reaction was mixed, and the world community continues to be divided on the issue of the international recognition of Kosovo. Libya extended official diplomatic recognition to Kosovo on 25 September 2013.

== Relations with the Gaddafi government ==
According to Serbia, Abdulhati Al Obeidi, Secretary for European Affairs of the Libyan Arab Jamahiriya, after meeting with the Serbian Minister of Foreign Affairs Vuk Jeremić on 17 March 2008, stated that Libya will not recognise a unilateral declaration of independence by Kosovo. Al Obeidi said that Libya strongly supports the position of Serbia regarding Kosovo, despite the pressure from the EU and some Islamic nations to recognise, and that Libya considers the unilateral declaration of independence illegal. Al Obeidi stated that Libyan leader Muammar Gaddafi considers the UNSC to be the only place where the Kosovo problem can be solved the right way. On 2 October 2008, according to Kosovan Foreign Minister, Skënder Hyseni, the Libyan ambassador at the UN, Giadalla Ettalhi, pledged to back Kosovo's independence while opposing Serbia's initiative to contest this. However, Libya did not partake in the vote.

According to Serbian Foreign Minister Vuk Jeremić, Gaddafi reassured him, during a 9 April 2009 meeting, that Libya will not recognise Kosovo.
In the written statement supplied to the ICJ in April 2009, Libya stated that "the proclamation of the independence of the Province of Kosovo unilaterally by its institutions of self-government is a violation of international law" and that "the commitment to the principle of the territorial integrity of the Republic of Serbia is in keeping with international law, which gives absolute sovereignty to States over their regions". Following a September 2009 meeting between Gaddafi and Kosovar politician Behgjet Pacolli, Pacolli's New Kosovo Alliance party stated that Gaddafi had promised to carefully examine the possibility of Libya recognising Kosovo. Gaddafi also reportedly told Pacolli that there would be no barrier to free movement of Kosovars in Libya, or the development of economic, and other, relations. In a subsequent interview, Pacolli said "Today I say that Muammar Gadafi is not against Kosovo... I have to say also that the problem is the relation of Libya with Russia... Even though he knows Kosovo, President Gadafi said to me that it's not the right time to recognize Kosovo". It has also been reported that during Pacolli's visit, Gaddafi said that he would "never recognise Kosovo as long as their leaders remained American poodles".

== Post-Gaddafi relations ==
On 15 July 2012, Khaled Saad Alfallah, a member of a parliamentary delegation of the new Libyan government, said that Libya could recognise the independence of Kosovo three to six months after the formation of Libya's new government. He said that public opinion is with Kosovo and that recognition is only a matter of time.
During a December 2012 visit to Libya by the Chairman of the Assembly of Kosovo, Jakup Krasniqi, the President of the General National Congress of Libya, Mohammed Magariaf, said that Libya's delay in recognising Kosovo's independence is linked to its relations with Serbia. But according to him, in spite of this, Libya is soon expected to take such a step. He said that in principle, Libya has no problem with recognition, and that Kosovo has a special significance.

In January 2013, Deputy Prime Minister and Minister of Foreign and Internal Trade and Telecommunications of Serbia, Rasim Ljajić, visited Libya. Ljajić said that Libyan officials and the Libyan Foreign Minister reported that they were under significant pressure from states in the region, and also Western countries, to recognise the independence of Kosovo. In February 2013, Mohamed Abdulaziz, Libya's Minister of International Cooperation, stated that it was only a matter of time until Kosovo was recognised by Libya. Libya officially recognised the independence of Kosovo on 25 September 2013. Serbian president Aleksandar Vučić claimed in 2023 that Libya has withdrawn recognition of Kosovo. However this was officially debunked by Kosovo and in the same month Kosovo's Ambassador to Belgium, Agron Bajrami, met with the Libyan Ambassador to Belgium, Amel Jerary. According to Bajrami's post, they "agreed about need for deepening Kosovo-Libya relations" thus confirming Libya recognition of Kosovo

== See also ==
- Foreign relations of Kosovo
- Foreign relations of Libya
