= 1993 in Libya =

- Decades: 1970s; 1980s; 1990s; 2000s; 2010s
- See also: Other events of 1993; List of years in Libya

The following lists events that happened in 1993 in Libya.

== Incumbents ==
- President: Muammar al-Gaddafi
- Prime Minister: Abuzed Omar Dorda

== Events ==
- October - The National Front for the Salvation of Libya reported that Gaddafi ordered executions and arrests of his opponents after a failed coup.
- November 11 - United Nations Security Council Resolution 883 increases the strength of the sanctions levelled against Libya in UNSC Resolutions 731 and 748. The sanctions were strengthened due to Gaddafi's continued refusal to extradite the suspects in the bombing of Pan Am Flight 103.
- December 19 - Gaddafi renounced Tripoli's weapons of mass destruction (WMD) programs and welcomed international inspectors to verify that Tripoli would follow through on dismantling those systems.

== Births ==
- 22 July - Abdelsalam Elfaitory, football player
