= 1992 in Libya =

- Decades: 1970s; 1980s; 1990s; 2000s; 2010s
- See also: Other events of 1992; List of years in Libya

The following lists events that happened in 1992 in Libya.

== Incumbents ==
- President: Muammar al-Gaddafi
- Prime Minister: Abuzed Omar Dorda

== Events ==
- Charles Wade, an American lobbyist, receives a $575,000 (USD) bribe to lobby the American government to remove sanctions against Libya. Wade would plead guilty to conspiring to violate the sanctions in 1995.
- January 21 - The United Nations issue United Nations Security Council Resolution 731, demanding that Libya hand over suspects in the bombings of Pan Am Flight 103 and UTA Flight 772.
- March 31 - The United Nations issue United Nations Security Council Resolution 748, implementing sanctions (including an arms embargo, but not an oil embargo) on Libya due to the country's refusal to abide by Resolution 731 from January.
