= 1981 in Libya =

- Decades: 1960s; 1970s; 1980s; 1990s; 2000s
- See also: Other events of 1981; List of years in Libya

The following lists events that happened during 1981 in Libya.

== Incumbents ==
- President: Muammar al-Gaddafi
- Prime Minister: Jadallah Azzuz at-Talhi

== Events ==
=== January ===
- 6 January - a joint communiqué is issued that Libya and Chad had decided "to work to achieve full unity between the two countries". The merger plan caused strong adverse reactions internationally.

=== May ===
- May 6 - Citing Libya's support of international terrorism, the United States ordered the closure of the Libyan Embassy in Washington, D.C. Ambassador Ali Houderi was summoned to the U.S. State Department, and told to withdraw the 27 diplomats and their families within one week. The U.S. Embassy in Libya had closed in 1980. Diplomatic relations were restored in 2004.

=== August ===
- 19 August - a naval dogfight occurred over the Gulf of Sirte. US F-14 Tomcat jets shot down two Libyan aircraft.

=== October ===
- 29 October - withdrawal of Libyan forces from Chadian territory, completed by 16 November. The Libyans were to be replaced by an OAU Inter-African Force (IAF).
- Launch of the second Five-Year Economic and Social Transformation Plan (1982-1987)
