= Moussa Koussa =

Former Libyan Minister of Foreign Affairs

- موسى كوسا
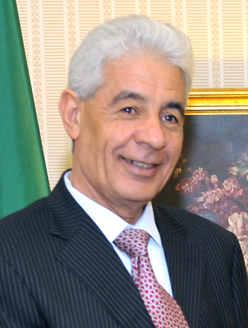
- Koussa in September 2010

Minister of Foreign Affairs
- In office 4 March 2009 – 30 March 2011
- Prime Minister: Baghdadi Mahmudi
- Leader: Muammar Gaddafi
- Preceded by: Abdel Rahman Shalgham
- Succeeded by: Abdul Ati al-Obeidi

Director of the External Security Service
- In office 1994 – 4 March 2009
- Preceded by: Abuzed Dorda

Personal details
- Born: 1949? Tajura, Libya
- Citizenship: Libya
- Education: Michigan State University

Moussa Muhammad El-Haj Nemr Koussa (Arabic: موسى محمد الحاج نمر كوسا, Arabic pronunciation: [ˈmusaˌkosa]; born 1949?) is a Libyan political figure and diplomat who held several high-profile positions in the Libyan government, lastly as Minister of Foreign Affairs from March 2009 until the Libyan Civil War, when he resigned his position on 30 March 2011.

Koussa previously headed the Mukhabarat el-Jamahiriya (national intelligence agency) from 1994 to 2009, and was considered one of the country's most powerful figures and a member of Gaddafi's inner circle. When he arrived in the United Kingdom in March 2011, the UK Foreign and Commonwealth Office released an official statement saying that Koussa no longer wished to represent the Libyan government and intended to resign. No charges were pressed against him by the British government, and in the following months financial sanctions on him were lifted by the Obama administration. He now lives in a small house in a suburb of Doha, Qatar, after being asked to leave his suite in Doha's luxurious Four Seasons hotel.

== Early life and education ==
Koussa was born in the Tripoli suburb of Tajura into a respected middle-class family with no significant tribal or other power base. He attended Michigan State University in East Lansing, Michigan, earning a degree in sociology in 1978 with a 200-plus pages study of Colonel Qaddafi titled "The political leader and his social background: Muammar Qadafi, the Libyan leader". Koussa was offered the chance to continue to study for a doctorate but instead returned to Tripoli. As a student, Koussa took great care with his work, interviewing Gaddafi twice, his family, childhood teachers, friends, and military colleagues, allowing him to paint a vivid picture of the influences and motivations of Gaddafi's revolutionary visions in his thesis, which may be the most comprehensive, revealing document in English about Libya's enigmatic leader. According to his thesis adviser, Christopher K. Vanderpool, Koussa would have had a promising career in academia had he not abandoned plans to study for a doctorate to become one of Gaddafi's closest confidants. He taught at the University of Tripoli for decades, even while serving the Libyan government in different roles.

== Chief of Intelligence and diplomat ==
After his return to Libya, Koussa was appointed Secretary of the Libyan People's Bureau in London in 1979. He was expelled from the United Kingdom in 1980, after commenting too candidly in an interview with The Times newspaper about his government's intention to eliminate two political opponents who were living in the UK.

From 1984 to 1992, Moussa Koussa was head of Al-Mathaba Aalamiya (meaning "The Safe house/place"), an ideological anti-imperialist organization known in the West as Libya's Center to Resist Imperialism, Racism, Backwardness and Fascism. Its leading members included Nelson Mandela, Fidel Castro, Luiz Inácio Lula da Silva, Yoweri Museveni, and Robert Mugabe. Under his tenure, Al-Mathaba played a leading role with the African National Congress against apartheid in South Africa. Instead, the organization in the West became widely known as a source of training, funding, and supporting revolutionary groups.

Moussa Koussa served as Deputy Minister of Foreign Affairs from 1992 to 1994. In 1994, Gaddafi fired Abdullah Senussi as head of the Libyan intelligence agency and reorganized the agency under a newly formed External Security Organization (ESO), headed by Moussa Koussa from 1994 to 2009. During this phase Moussa Koussa was the key figure in the normalization of relations between Libya and many NATO nations, including the United States and the United Kingdom. He played a crucial role in securing the release of Abdelbaset al-Megrahi, the alleged Pan Am Flight 103 bomber, whose involvement in the story is quite controversial. Several legal experts as well as the UN observer at the Lockerbie trial have vehemently challenged the verdict that convicted Megrahi. Koussa is also credited with the expulsion of Abu Nidal from Libya, whom he describes as a ruthless murderer and terrorist that Gaddafi allowed to live in Libya in 1986, the year the United States launched Operation El Dorado Canyon against Gaddafi for his association and harboring of terrorists. On 23 August 2002, the BBC reported that Abu Nidal was 'behind Lockerbie bombing'. In October 2008, Moussa Koussa, listed as an interpreter, met both British and Scottish government officials, while on a second visit in January 2009, he was listed as Minister of Security.

In 2004, he allegedly played a leading role in the failed assassination plot against Abdullah of Saudi Arabia.

Over the decades, Koussa gained a reputation as an urbane and worldly figure "who would not have looked out of place as a Western ambassador," according to the former Central Intelligence Agency agent Paul R. Pillar.

Koussa is further credited by the CIA, British MI6, as well as French Intelligence Services for unraveling a labyrinth of Islamic radical and fundamentalist cells and movements in neighboring Sudan, Niger, Mali, and Chad. Such groups would come to be known as Al-Qaeda. On 16 March 1998, five months before the Al-Qaeda bombings of the US Embassies in Kenya and Tanzania, Libya ordered the first alert to Interpol for the capture of Osama bin Laden, a fact unbeknown to the wider public. The warrant was forwarded to Interpol in France, where it was formalized on 15 April 1998.

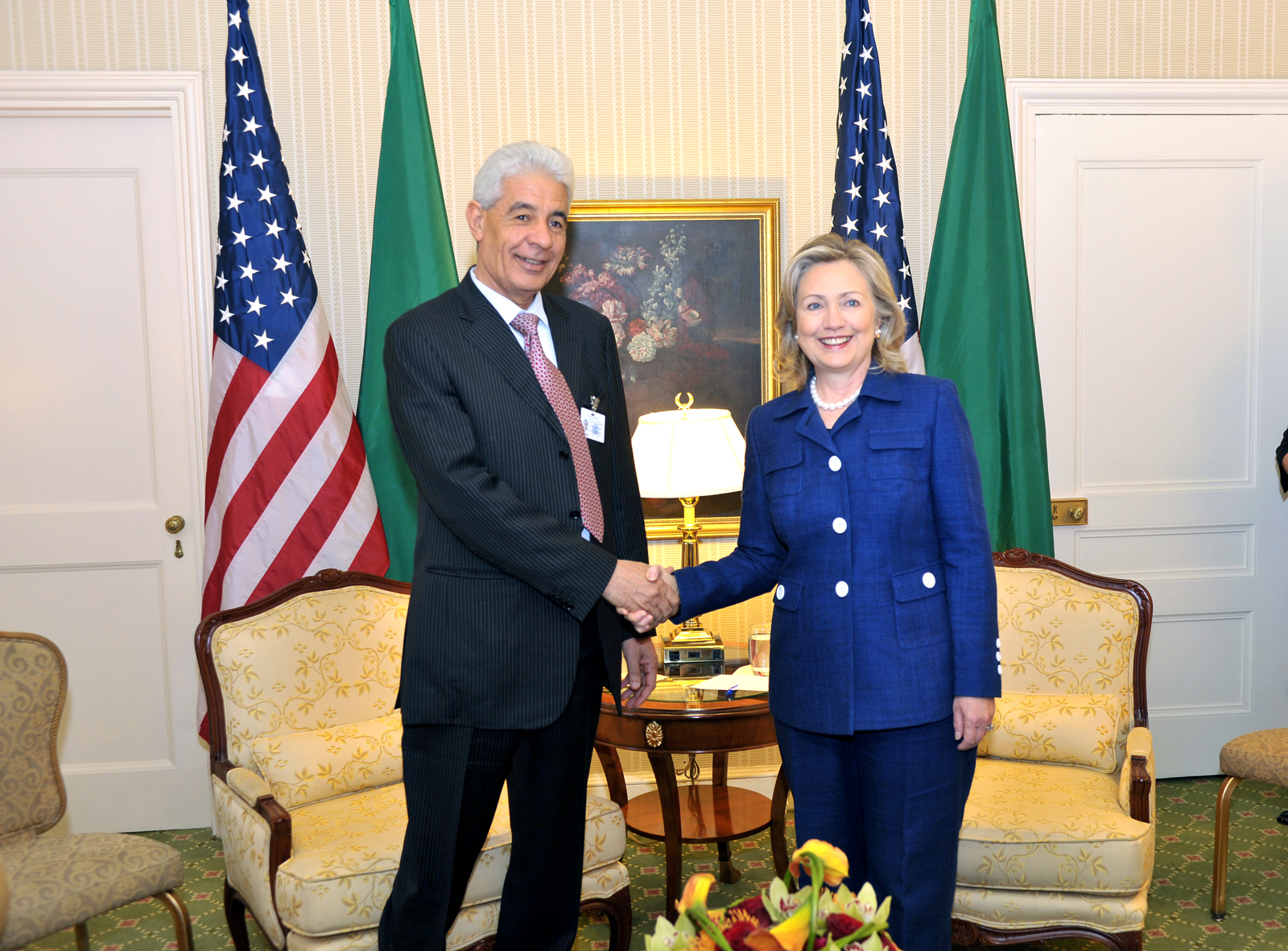
Moussa Koussa with Hillary Clinton in 2010

In 2004, George Tenet credited Libya for issuing the first international red notice Interpol alert and arrest warrant for Osama bin Laden. Koussa was also credited for negotiating Libya's decision to give up its WMD program, thus facilitating Libya's reintegration into the international community. Leaked US diplomatic cables reveal that the U.S. viewed Moussa Koussa as a character of high interest with a combination of intellectual acumen, operational ability, and political weight. Oliver Miles, a former British ambassador to Tripoli, stated Koussa is "straightforward and reliable ... I found him a perfectly reasonable person to deal with." Another leaked cable described him as "a useful and powerful interlocutor who has been mostly cooperative in liaison channels and key to our re-engagement."

Koussa was appointed Foreign Minister in 2009, replacing Abdurrahman Mohamed Shalgham, who was appointed Libyan ambassador to the United Nations in New York. In the May 2009 cable, Foreign Minister Moussa Koussa expressed concerns about the Canadian Government led by Stephen Harper over the issue of ransom payments, which would only further strengthen Al-Qaeda's traction in the Saharan belt and parts of North Africa. There had been eight kidnappings in the past six months, including two Canadian officials who had been released in return for money.

Koussa accompanied Mutassim Gaddafi on a visit to the United Nations headquarters in New York soon after Libya emerged from international isolation. A U.S. embassy cable quoted Koussa, in a private conversation, as saying that Mutassim was not a keen student of international relations and had to be prompted to read books on the subject. Before the Libya crisis, there were indications that Koussa was no longer at the center of the country's ruling circle. He was held responsible for the defection of Nuri Mesmari to France in October 2010 and his passport was allegedly confiscated by Gaddafi. At an international summit in Tripoli in December 2010, Koussa spent much of his time smoking in the public buffet area while the rest of Gaddafi's entourage were cloistered in a private room.

== Departure and resignation ==
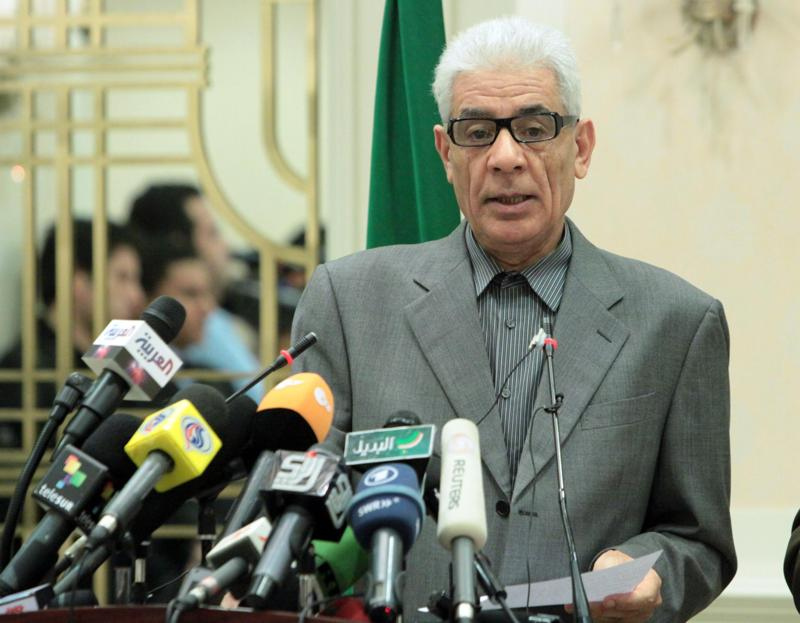
Moussa Koussa at a press conference in 2011

The events of the Arab Spring began in Tunisia in December 2010. By January the Tunisian revolution was under way, and demonstrations began in Libya in mid-January. An armed revolt against Gaddafi began in February 2011. Koussa, accompanied by his deputy Abdul Ati al-Obeidi, departed Tripoli by car and arrived in Tunis, Tunisia, on 28 March 2011, via the Ras Ajdir border crossing. A Tunisian government spokesman stated via Tunis Afrique Presse that Koussa had arrived on a "private visit." On 30 March 2011, Koussa departed from Djerba on a Swiss-registered private jet, while Obeidi returned to Tripoli. Koussa arrived at Farnborough Airfield, England, according to Libyan sources on a diplomatic mission. The Foreign and Commonwealth Office later released an official press statement, stating that Koussa no longer wished to represent the Libyan government and intended to resign, unhappy with Libyan Army attacks on civilians.

Scottish prosecutors interviewed Koussa about the Lockerbie bombing, and found no judicial reason or evidence to hold him in captivity. At the time, Koussa was a leading member of Al-Mathaba.

Koussa left the United Kingdom and moved to Qatar following a European Union decision to lift sanctions against him, meaning he no longer faces travel restrictions or an asset freeze. Moussa Koussa's role in the torture and deaths of Libyan people was alleged by the BBC Television Panorama programme in October 2011, after which Koussa issued a statement to the press through his lawyer, strongly denying the allegations.

== See also ==
- Moussa Ibrahim
- General People's Committee of Libya
- List of Libyans

Government offices
Unknown	Head of the Libyan Intelligence Agency; 1994–2009	Unknown
Political offices
Preceded by Abdel Rahman Shalgham	Minister of Foreign Affairs of Libya; 2009–2011	Succeeded by Abdel Ati al-Obeidi (Acting)
