= 1982 in Libya =

- Decades: 1960s; 1970s; 1980s; 1990s; 2000s
- See also: Other events of 1982; List of years in Libya

The following lists events that happened in 1982 in Libya.

== Incumbents ==
- Prime Minister: Jadallah Azzuz at-Talhi

== Events ==
=== March ===
- Libya hosted the 1982 African Cup of Nations
