= 1991 in Libya =

- Decades: 1970s; 1980s; 1990s; 2000s; 2010s
- See also: Other events of 1991; List of years in Libya

The following lists events that happened in 1991 in Libya.

== Incumbents ==
- President: Muammar al-Gaddafi
- Prime Minister: Abuzed Omar Dorda

== Events ==
=== November ===
- November 13 - The United Kingdom and the United States charge two Libyan men with the Pan Am Flight 103 bombing.
- November 27 - The US, UK and France call on the Libyan government to surrender the suspects for trial.

== Births ==
- 23 April - Rabea Al Laafi.

== Deaths ==
- 25 February - Suleiman Ali Nashnush.
- 7 November - Nuri Ja'far, Iraqi psychologist and philosopher of education.

== Sport ==
- 1991–92 Libyan Premier League
