= 1994 in Libya =

- Decades: 1970s; 1980s; 1990s; 2000s; 2010s
- See also: Other events of 1994; List of years in Libya

The following lists events that happened in 1994 in Libya.

== Incumbents ==
- President: Muammar al-Gaddafi
- Prime Minister: Abuzed Omar Dorda (until 29 January), Abdul Majid al-Qa′ud (starting 29 January)

== Events ==
- 3 February – The Libya–Chad Territorial Dispute case was decided by the International Court of Justice in favor of Chad
- 1994–95 Libyan Premier League
