= 2000 in Libya =

- Decades: 1980s; 1990s; 2000s; 2010s; 2020s
- See also: Other events of 2000; List of years in Libya

The following lists events that happened in 2000 in Libya.

== Incumbents ==
- President: Muammar al-Gaddafi
- Prime Minister: Muhammad Ahmad al-Mangoush (until 1 March), Imbarek Shamekh (starting 1 March)

== Events ==
=== January ===
- 13 January - 2000 Marsa Brega Short 360 crash

=== March ===
- 2 March - Imbarek Shamekh is appointed Secretary of the General People's Committee.
- Six Libyan nationals are sentenced in absentia by the Court of Assizes in Paris to life imprisonment for the 1989 bombing of a French UTA airliner over Niger.

=== April ===
- 7 April - The Egyptian Court of Cassation suspends a Cairo Court of Appeals ruling ordering compensation to the wife of disappeared Libyan opposition leader Mansour Kikhiya.
- The UN Security Council suspends the international air embargo and other sanctions against Libya after two suspects for the 1988 Lockerbie bombing trial are handed over.

=== August ===
- Mohammad 'Ali al-Bakoush, detained without charge since 1989, dies in Abu Salim Prison reportedly due to poor detention conditions.

=== September ===
- 15 September - 1 October: 2000 Summer Olympics - Libya competes at the Sydney Olympics with three athletes in judo, taekwondo, and marathon, winning no medals.
- 30 September - Colonel Mu'ammar al-Gaddafi publicly invites Amnesty International and other human rights groups to visit Libya, denying the existence of political prisoners.
- The government expels hundreds of sub-Saharan workers following mob violence and attacks on their residences and workplaces.

=== October ===
- 18–29 October: 2000 Summer Paralympics - Libya sends its largest-ever delegation (17 athletes across 3 sports) to the Sydney 2000 Summer Paralympics. Abdelrahim Hamed wins Libya's first-ever Paralympic medal, a bronze, in the men's +100 kg powerlifting event (lifting 235 kg).
