= 2001 in Libya =

- Decades: 1980s; 1990s; 2000s; 2010s; 2020s
- See also: Other events of 2001; List of years in Libya

The following lists events that happened in 2001 in Libya.

== Incumbents ==
- President: Muammar al-Gaddafi
- Prime Minister: Imbarek Shamekh
