= 2008 in Libya =

- Decades: 1980s; 1990s; 2000s; 2010s; 2020s
- See also: Other events of 2008; List of years in Libya

The following lists events that happened in 2008 in Libya.

== Incumbents ==
- President: Muammar al-Gaddafi
- Prime Minister: Baghdadi Mahmudi

== Events ==
- April - Russia cancels $4.5 billion worth of Libya's foreign debt as part of a larger set of business deals including railways, weaponry, and oil.
- August 26 - A Sun Air flight with 95 passengers is hijacked after taking off from Darfur and flown to the Kufra airbase in Libya. The hijackers released the passengers a day later and the motives for the hijacking were personal and non-political, focused on being granted asylum in France or Libya.
- August 30 - Italy signed a $5 billion deal for infrastructure investments in Libya, coupled with an apology for damage done to Libya from Italian colonization of the country.
- November 21 - The U.S. appoints its first ambassador to Libya in 36 years, after Libya paid compensation to Pan Am Flight 103 victims' families.
