= 1995 in Libya =

- Decades: 1970s; 1980s; 1990s; 2000s; 2010s
- See also: Other events of 1995; List of years in Libya

The following lists events that happened in 1995 in Libya.

== Incumbents ==
- President: Muammar al-Gaddafi
- Prime Minister: Abdul Majid al-Qa′ud

== Events ==
- July 28 - The United Nations Security Council extended sanctions on Libya over its role in the bombing of Pan Am Flight 103 and UTA Flight 772.
- September 1 - Gaddafi orders the expulsion of 30,000 Palestinians living in Libya, as a gesture of his opposition to the Oslo II Accord process between the Palestinian Liberation Organization (PLO) and Israel. The expulsion process went badly, with many Palestinians sent to poorly-equipped refugee camps on the Egyptian border or stranded in Cyprus, and the process was temporarily halted in late October 1995. It resumed in 1996, halving the number of Palestinians living in Libya.
- September - The Libyan government cracks down on opponents of President Gaddafi in Benghazi and other eastern Libyan cities, leading to at least 30 deaths and approximately 3,500 people being arrested.

== Sport ==
- 1995–96 Libyan Premier League
