= 1972 in Libya =

- Decades: 1950s; 1960s; 1970s; 1980s; 1990s
- See also: Other events of 1972; List of years in Libya

The following lists events that happened in 1972 in Libya.

== Incumbents ==
- Prime Minister: Muammar Gaddafi (until 16 July), Abdessalam Jalloud (starting 16 July)

== Events ==
- 11 June. Muammar Gaddafi announces that any Arab wishing to volunteer for Palestinian armed groups "can register his name at any Libyan embassy will be given adequate training for combat". In retaliation, the United States withdraws its ambassador.
- 1972–73 Libyan Premier League
