= 2004 in Libya =

- Decades: 1980s; 1990s; 2000s; 2010s; 2020s
- See also: Other events of 2004; List of years in Libya

The following lists events that happened in 2004 in Libya.

== Incumbents ==
- President: Muammar al-Gaddafi
- Prime Minister: Shukri Ghanem

== Events ==
=== January ===
- January 6 - Pakistan is cited as the source of nuclear weapon technology supplied to Libya, Iran and North Korea. The components intercepted at sea by Italy en route to Libya were fabricated in Malaysia. There is no evidence that the Pakistani government of President Pervez Musharraf knew about the transfer of technology of Libya.

=== February ===
- February 25 - Libya's Foreign Minister, Abdulrahman Shalgam, issues a statement reaffirming its acceptance of culpability for the 1988 bombing of Pan Am Flight 103 over Lockerbie, after the Prime Minister Shukri Ghanem, in an interview for the BBC, claimed Libya had "bought peace" with the $2.7bn compensation payments, but had not accepted guilt.

=== March ===
- March 7 - The White House reports that all of Libya's remaining nuclear weapons-related equipment has been sent to the United States.
