= 2005 in Libya =

- Decades: 1980s; 1990s; 2000s; 2010s; 2020s
- See also: Other events of 2005; List of years in Libya

The following lists events that happened in 2005 in Libya.

== Incumbents ==
- President: Muammar al-Gaddafi
- Prime Minister: Shukri Ghanem

== Events ==
=== January ===
- January 20 - Italian police have arrested number of people connected to smuggling of illegal immigrants from Libya.

=== March ===
- March 23 - Muammar al-Gaddafi states that he is not going to pardon five Bulgarian nurses that face a death penalty accused of injecting children with the HIV.

=== May ===
- May 17 - Six African countries begin a two-day summit in Tripoli to assess situation in Darfur, Sudan. None of the local rebel groups have sent representatives.

=== December ===
- December 25 - The Supreme Court in Libya overturned the death sentences given to international health workers charged with infecting children with HIV.
