= 1984 Moroccan Arabic–African Federation Treaty referendum =

31 August 1984

Results
Choice	Votes	%
Yes	7,490,514	99.96%
No	3,130	0.04%
Valid votes	7,493,644	99.71%
Invalid or blank votes	21,700	0.29%
Total votes	7,515,344	100.00%
Registered voters/turnout	7,742,908	97.06%

A referendum on the Arabic–African Federation Treaty (Oujda Treaty) was held in Morocco on 31 August 1984. The treaty would create a union of states between Morocco and Libya as part of a first step towards a "Great Arab Maghreb". It was approved by 99.96% of voters, with a 97% turnout.

== Results ==
Choice	Votes	%
For	7,490,514	99.96
Against	3,130	0.04
Total	7,493,644	100.00
Valid votes	7,493,644	99.71
Invalid/blank votes	21,700	0.29
Total votes	7,515,344	100.00
Registered voters/turnout	7,742,908	97.06
Source: López García
