= 2007 in Libya =

- Decades: 1980s; 1990s; 2000s; 2010s; 2020s
- See also: Other events of 2007; List of years in Libya

The following lists events that happened during 2007 in Libya.

== Incumbents ==
- President: Muammar al-Gaddafi
- Prime Minister: Baghdadi Mahmudi

== Events ==
=== July ===
- July 1 - The African Union meets in Accra, Ghana, for a summit with attention focussed on a proposal by Muammar al-Gaddafi of Libya for a pan-African government.
- July 12 - Cécilia Sarkozy, the wife of French President Nicolas Sarkozy, flies to Libya and visits the Bulgarian medics condemned to death for allegedly infecting children with HIV and also the families of the infected children. She will also meet Colonel Muammar al-Gaddafi, the President of Libya.
- July 25 - The President of France Nicolas Sarkozy travels to Libya following the release of the medical workers sentenced to death in the HIV trial in Libya.

=== August ===
- August 2 - Following the release of six medics convicted of infecting Libyan children with HIV, Bulgaria is to waive Libyan debts worth $57 million.
- August 3 - France is to sell Libya anti-tank missiles and radio communications equipment worth $405 million.

=== October ===
- October 4 - The Déby government and the four main Chadian armed groups sign an accord in Libya, which in exchange for a ceasefire promises a government posts. The accord opens the road for the deployment in eastern Chad of an international peace contingent.
- October 16 - Libya is elected to the United Nations Security Council as a non-permanent member.
