= 1996 in Libya =

- Decades: 1970s; 1980s; 1990s; 2000s; 2010s
- See also: Other events of 1996; List of years in Libya

The following lists events that happened in Libya in 1996

== Incumbents ==
- President: Muammar al-Gaddafi
- Prime Minister: Abdul Majid al-Qa′ud

== Events ==
- March 27 - Egyptian hijackers commandeer an Egyptian passenger flight in Luxor and land it in Martubah, Libya, demanding a meeting with world leaders. The hijackers released the 152 passengers unharmed and surrendered to the Libyan military.
- August - The United States announced sanctions on companies with greater than $40 million (USD) annual investments in Libya or Iran, despite objections from Germany, France, Canada, and the European Union.
- August - Louis Farrakhan, head of the Nation of Islam, travels to Libya to receive the Gadhafi Human Rights Award.

== Sport ==
- 1995–96 Libyan Premier League
- 1996–97 Libyan Premier League
