= 2009 in Libya =

- Decades: 1980s; 1990s; 2000s; 2010s; 2020s
- See also: Other events of 2009; List of years in Libya

The following lists events that happened in 2009 in Libya.

== Incumbents ==
- President: Muammar al-Gaddafi
- Prime Minister: Baghdadi Mahmudi

== Events ==
- February 2 - Libyan President al-Gaddafi is elected as the chairman of the African Union.
- March - Libya hosts a visit from Sudanese President Omar al-Bashir, less than a month after the International Criminal Court issued a warrant for Bashir's arrest.
- August 20 - Abdel al-Megrahi, convicted for his role in the bombing of Pan Am Flight 103, is returned to Libya after being released from a Scottish prison due to his terminal illness. He is warmly greeted at the airport in Tripoli by thousands of Libyans.
