= 1975 in Libya =

- Decades: 1950s; 1960s; 1970s; 1980s; 1990s
- See also: Other events of 1975; List of years in Libya

The following lists events that happened in 1975 in Libya.

== Incumbents ==
- Prime Minister: Abdessalam Jalloud

== Events ==
- Muammar Gaddafi announces a first time Five-Year Economic and Social Transformation Plan (1976–80)
- Publication of the Green Book, detailing the Third International Theory
- 1975–76 Libyan Premier League

== Births ==
- Sema Sgaier (born in Tripoli), scientist, global health expert, and documentary photographer
