= Libya and weapons of mass destruction =

Libya
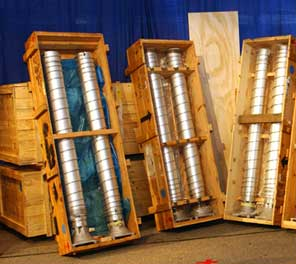
- The gas centrifuge tubes acquired from Libya's program, ca. 2002.

- Location of Libya
- Nuclear program start date: 1969; 57 years ago
- Nuclear program end date: December 19, 2003; 22 years ago
- First nuclear weapon test: None
- First thermonuclear weapon test: None
- Last nuclear test: None
- Largest yield test: None
- Total tests: None
- Peak stockpile: None (Program was initial and developmental stage before its rollback)
- Current stockpile: None
- Maximum missile range: Scud-B; 300 kilometres (190 mi)
- Nuclear triad: No
- NPT party: Yes

Libya pursued programs to develop or acquire weapons of mass destruction from when Colonel Muammar Gaddafi of Libyan Army seized control of Libya in 1969 until he announced on 19 December 2003 that Libya would voluntarily terminate its programs of nuclear, chemical, ballistic missiles, and other efforts that could lead to internationally proscribed weapons of mass destruction.

In 1968, Libya under King Idris signed the Nuclear Non-Proliferation Treaty (NPT), ratified it under Gaddafi in 1975, and concluded a safeguards agreement with the International Atomic Energy Agency (IAEA) in 1980. Despite being the signatory state of NPT, Libya under Gaddafi pursued nuclear weapons from different venues including employing of foreign experts and using the proliferation network to locally advance its efforts. After the terrorist attacks in the United States in 2001, followed by the Iraq War in 2003, Libya engaged in rolling back its efforts in an exchange of improving the relations with the United States and the Western world. The United States and the United Kingdom assisted Libya in removing equipment and rolling back its program, with independent verification by the IAEA.

In 1972, Libya signed the Biological Weapons Convention (BWC) and ratified it in 1982.

In 1970, Libya secretly acquired chemical weapons capability from the Soviet Union and was one of the non-signatory states of Chemical Weapons Convention (CWC), only acceded to become a member of the CWC on 6 January 2004. Libya declared 24.7 metric tonnes of mustard gas, 1,390 metric tonnes of chemical precursors for making sarin, as well as 3,563 unloaded chemical weapon munitions (aerial bombs). Destruction of the Libyan chemical weapons was agreed upon when the Organisation for the Prohibition of Chemical Weapons (OPCW) set January 2014 as the deadline for the full destruction of Libya's chemical weapons. Libya began destroying its chemical stockpiles and munitions later in 2004, but it missed deadlines for converting one chemical weapons production facility to peaceful use and for destroying its stockpile of mustard agent.

In October 2014, Libya asked for foreign assistance to transport its 850 tonne stockpile of precursor chemicals for making nerve gas out of Libya for destruction. In February 2015, Libyan military sources told media that unidentified armed men had captured large amounts of Libya’s chemical weapons, including mustard gas and sarin. Destruction of Libya's chemical weapon precursors was completed in November 2017.

Libya signed the Treaty on the Prohibition of Nuclear Weapons on 20 September 2017, but has not ratified it.

== Nuclear program ==
In 1968, Libya under Idris became a signatory state of the Non-Proliferation Treaty (NPT) and was ratified by Muammar Gaddafi in 1975. This was followed by the safeguards agreement with the International Atomic Energy Agency (IAEA) in 1980 that allowed the cooperation on peaceful applications of nuclear power with the Soviet Union.

Despite being a signatory state of the Non-Proliferation Treaty and its international obligations, Libya under Gaddafi since 1969 had actively pursued its ambitions of acquiring nuclear weapons by employing large number of foreign experts and used proliferation network to allegedly to counter the covert Israeli nuclear capability.

Eventually, the Libyan efforts were later exposed by Friedrich Tinner (one of their leading foreign experts) in an exchange for immunity in 2003. Earlier in July 1995, the IAEA had reported that Libya had made a "strategic decision to reinvigorate its nuclear activities, including gas centrifuge uranium enrichment," which can enrich uranium for use in nuclear reactors as well as for nuclear weapons.

After the dissolution of the Soviet Union in 1991 and the terrorist attacks in the United States in 2001, followed by the Iraq War in 2003, Libya under Gaddafi engaged in nuclear disarmament with the assistance from the United States and the IAEA in an exchange for improving relations with the Western world.

At the time its nuclear program was rolled back, the Libya's nuclear program remained in and early developmental stage.

=== Foreign assistance ===
Gaddafi's most famous buying foray for nuclear weapons was in 1970, when Libyan leaders paid a state visit to China. Gaddafi and his Prime Minister Abdessalam Jalloud made an unsuccessful attempt to convince China to sell tactical nuclear weapons to Libya. Gaddafi's justification for seeking nuclear weapons was his concern over the Israeli nuclear capability, and publicly expressed his desire to obtain nuclear weapons.

In 1974, Gaddafi paid a state visit to Pakistan to attend the second summit of the Organisation of Islamic Cooperation in Lahore and found a secret opportunity to research on the nuclear weapons in Pakistan. With the takeover of the Bhutto administration by the Pakistani military in 1977, Libya was restricted and any attempts for its requests were rebuffed by the upcoming Zia administration due to President Zia's personal distrust and dislike for the Libyans.

With relations severed with Pakistan, Gaddafi normalized relations with India in 1978, and eventually reaching a mutual understanding for civil nuclear cooperation with India. An effort was made to gain access to the raw uranium ore in a view of enriching towards industrial-grade uranium but this approach proved difficult and failed due to lack of scientific capability. In 1980, Libya decided to acquire plutonium and secretly imported 1,200 kilograms (2,600 lb) of uranium ore from Niger without notifying it to the IAEA as required by its safeguards' agreement. In 1982, Libya made an unsuccessful negotiation attempt with Belgium to procure a small industrial plant for manufacturing UF^{4} solid compound.

In 1984, Gaddafi facilitated the visit of the Indian Prime Minister Indira Gandhi to Libya and was successful in reaching a pact with India on nuclear technology. India, citing the lack of manpower and infrastructure, later downplayed any cooperation with Libya. During the same year, Libya had reached out to Japan for procuring a small uranium conversion plant and a Japanese company supplied Libya with the technology; the sale was apparently arranged directly with the Japanese instead of through middlemen.

In 1985 and onward, Libya under Gaddafi used a smuggling network which UN weapons investigators found had connections to China.

The Libyan program had employed Friedrich Tinner, a Swiss engineer who guided on most of the Libyan efforts on scaling the uranium towards military-grade using the gas centrifuges methods but was unable to produce an operating centrifuge without the outside technical experts. In 1995, Gaddafi renewed calls for nuclear weapons and pursued new avenues for nuclear technology procurement, while publicly affirming its NPT commitments. With the enforcement of the economic sanctions on Libya and Iran by the Clinton administration in 1996, Gaddafi sought to persuade U.S. President Bill Clinton to lift UN sanctions in exchange for giving up its WMD programs.

In 1997, Libya received technical information on gas centrifuges from its smuggling network and was able to restart the project under Tinner, after it received 20 pre-assembled centrifuges and components for an additional 200 centrifuges and related parts from foreign suppliers.

In October 2000, the Libyan efforts oversaw by Tinner were successful in installing a complete single centrifuge, using a pre-assembled rotors, at its Al Hashan site. However, further experiments relating to the efficiency, performance, and efficacy of the centrifuges failed as the technical guides and documents were too difficult to interpret and bring into operation. Ultimately, Libya notified the IAEA and told its investigators that it had no national personnel competent to evaluate these designs at that time, and due to its extreme difficulty, Libya would have had to ask the supplier for help if it had decided to pursue a nuclear weapon.

==== Soviet Union ====
In 1979, Libya fostered close strategic ties with the Soviet Union including cooperation on peaceful use of nuclear technology under IAEA safeguards. In 1981, the Soviet Union agreed to build a 10 megawatts (0.010 GW) research reactor at Tajoura, known as the "Tajura Nuclear Research Facility (TNRF)". There were reports of unsanctioned experiments being performed by the Russian experts on the uranium at the behest of the Libyan government. An unnamed nuclear weapon state, whose name has been kept secret by the IAEA, allegedly assisted Libya in these experiments. American nuclear weapons expert, David Albright of the Institute for Science and International Security, said the Soviet Union and China were the most likely suspects.

In 1984, Libya began to negotiate with the Soviet Union for purchasing a commercial nuclear power plant but talks failed due to technical difficulties encountered in understanding and running Russian RBMK reactors.

In 1991, Libya tried to exploit the chaos generated by the collapse of the Soviet Union to gain access to nuclear technology, expertise, personnel, and materials. In 1992, it was reported by an official of the Kurchatov Institute in Moscow claimed that Libya had unsuccessfully tried to recruit two of his colleagues to work at the "Tajoura Nuclear Research Center" in Libya. Other reports also suggested that Russian scientists had been hired to work on a covert Libyan nuclear efforts.

In March 1998, Russia and Libya signed a contract with the Russian consortium, the Atomenergoeksport, for a partial overhaul of the Tajoura Nuclear Research Center.

=== Dismantlement ===
In 1992, the rollback of the Libya's nuclear program started with the Clinton administration according to the U.S. diplomat, Martin Indyk, who maintained that the negotiations and diplomatic efforts rolling back Libyan nuclear program were started as early as Bill Clinton assuming the presidency.

== Chemical weapons program ==
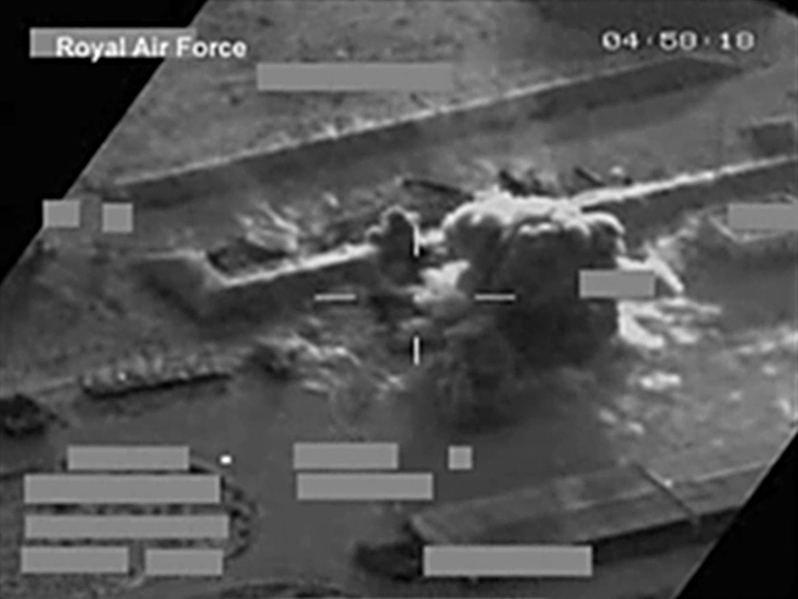
A RAF Tornado striking the Scud missile launcher during the military intervention in Libya in 2011.

In August 1987, the Chadian government accused Libya of using chemical weapons during the Chadian–Libyan War. In 1970, Libya under Gaddafi received Scud missile launchers and obtained chemical munitions from the former Soviet Union and the East Germany with other reports claiming that the Libyans received chemical warfare training from the Soviet Union and some chemical agents from Poland in 1980, or from Iran in exchange for naval mines for their tanker war against Iraq. In response to these claims the United States shipped 2,000 gas masks to Chad. According to West German intelligence reports, Libya was working on the construction of chemical weapons facility during the 1980s.

Libya under Gaddafi actively maintained a chemical weapons program and deliverable to Soviet-supplied missiles, which was ostensibly decommissioned in the 2003 and early 2010s as Gaddafi sought to normalise relations with the Western world. Libya acceded to the Chemical Weapons Convention with effect on 5 February 2004, and declared 24.7 metric tonnes of mustard gas, 1,390 metric tonnes of chemical precursors for making sarin, as well as 3,563 unloaded chemical weapon munitions (aerial bombs).

=== Destruction ===
The Organisation for the Prohibition of Chemical Weapons (OPCW) supervised the destruction of Libya's chemical weapons through February 2011, when it was forced to suspend its operations due to the uprising against Gaddafi and the resulting deterioration of the country's stability. By then, Libya had destroyed 40% of its precursor materials and 55% of its mustard gas, as well as 3,500 chemical weapon munitions. In early September 2011, OPCW Director-General Ahmet Üzümcü said reports he had received indicated that the remaining weapons were secure and had not fallen into the hands of militant groups.

A stockpile of mustard gas, which the OPCW reported the regime may have attempted to hide from inspectors overseeing the chemical weapons program's dismantlement, was reportedly found in the Jufra District by anti-Gaddafi fighters less than two weeks later. In late September it was reported by the Wall Street Journal that a major ammunition complex, including chemical-weapons-capable artillery shells, was unguarded and open to looting. In December 2012 a senior Spanish intelligence official said that Al Qaeda in the Islamic Maghreb "probably also has non-conventional arms, basically chemical, as a result of the loss of control of arsenals", with Libya the most likely source.

Libya's National Transitional Council cooperated with the OPCW in the destruction of the remaining chemical weapons. After assessing the chemical stockpiles, the OPCW set a deadline for the destruction of the weapons by the Libyan government. As of September 2013, 1.6 metric tons of mustard blister agent loaded in artillery rounds, 2.5 metric tons of congealed mustard agent, and 846 metric tons of chemical weapons ingredients remained to be destroyed.

According to The New York Times, in February 2014, the remnants of Libya's chemical weapons had been discreetly destroyed by the United States and Libya, using a transportable oven technology to destroy hundreds of bombs and artillery rounds filled with deadly mustard agent.

In September 2014, OPCW said Libya still had around 850 tonnes of industrial chemicals that could be used to produce chemical weapons. In October 2014, Libya asked for foreign assistance to transport that stockpile of raw materials for making nerve gas out of Libya for destruction. On 5 February 2015, the Libyan Minister of Foreign Affairs and the Director-General of OPCW agreed on the need to complete the destruction of the remaining precursor chemicals.

On 21 February 2015, Asharq Al-Awsat reported that an anonymous Libyan army official stated extremists had seized large amounts of Gaddafi’s chemical weapons from multiple locations. The official warned that the targeted caches included mustard gas and sarin. The North Africa Post later reported that chemical weapons were stolen by armed men who stormed the chemical factory in the Jufra district where the weapons were stored. Military sources reportedly stated that among the chemical weapons are mustard gas and sarin. On 31 August 2016, the last stockpile of ingredients for chemical weapons in the country was removed to Germany to avoid it falling into the hands of militants and was slated for destruction. Destruction of Libya's chemical weapon precursors was completed in November 2017.

== Ballistic missiles ==
Threat ranges of Soviet-supplied Libyan Scud missiles.

The strategic relations with the Soviet Union allowed Libya to purchase at least 80 Scud-B missiles with transporter erector launchers, 40 FROG-7 missiles with transporter erector launchers, and several hundreds of chemical weapons deliverable missiles from the Soviet Union.

In 1982, Libya sent two 9P117 trucks and around 20 Scud-B missiles to Iran for the Islamic Revolutionary Guard Corps (IRGC) alongside with its instructors during the War of the cities against Iraq. After the Russians in Soviet Union pressured Libya to stop supplying missiles, the Iranian IRGC sought assistance from North Korea instead for missile production.

In 1986, Gaddafi ordered the launch of Scud-B missiles against a United States facility on the Italian island of Lampedusa in retaliation for the United States bombing of Libya. Two missiles were fired, but fell short of their mark.

The Libya under Gaddafi also worked on the development of a domestically produced 950–1,000 km (590–620 mi) range missile, the "Al-Fatah" reportedly based on a West German design (the OTRAG rocket) with foreign assistance from Iraq, Iran, Serbia, and China. Due the slow engineering progress of the program, it was reported that Libya entered negotiations with North Korea to purchase Hwasong-7 missiles (or even Taepodong missiles), but such rumors ultimately proved to be false after the disarmament of Libya in 2003.

The Libyans purchased at least five Hwasong-6 (Scud-C) missiles from North Korea in 1995, receiving them in 1999. They were never tested or deployed and were ultimately scrapped (alongside their planned local production) after 2003. In exchange for the lifting of Western economic sanctions, Libya largely abandoned its domestic missiles program in 2004.

The Libyan Army under Gaddafi reportedly fired several Soviet Scud-B surface-to-surface missiles at areas in revolt against the regime, including Misrata and Ajdabiya, during the Libyan Civil War of 2011, but the missiles had missed their targets. Several more Scuds, with launchers, were found by anti-Gaddafi fighters near Tripoli and Sirte. The final phases of the NATO intervention reportedly destroyed the remaining Scud missiles in Libyan inventory, effectively ending the Libyan missile capability.

Chemical weapons delivery system of Libya (1971–2011)
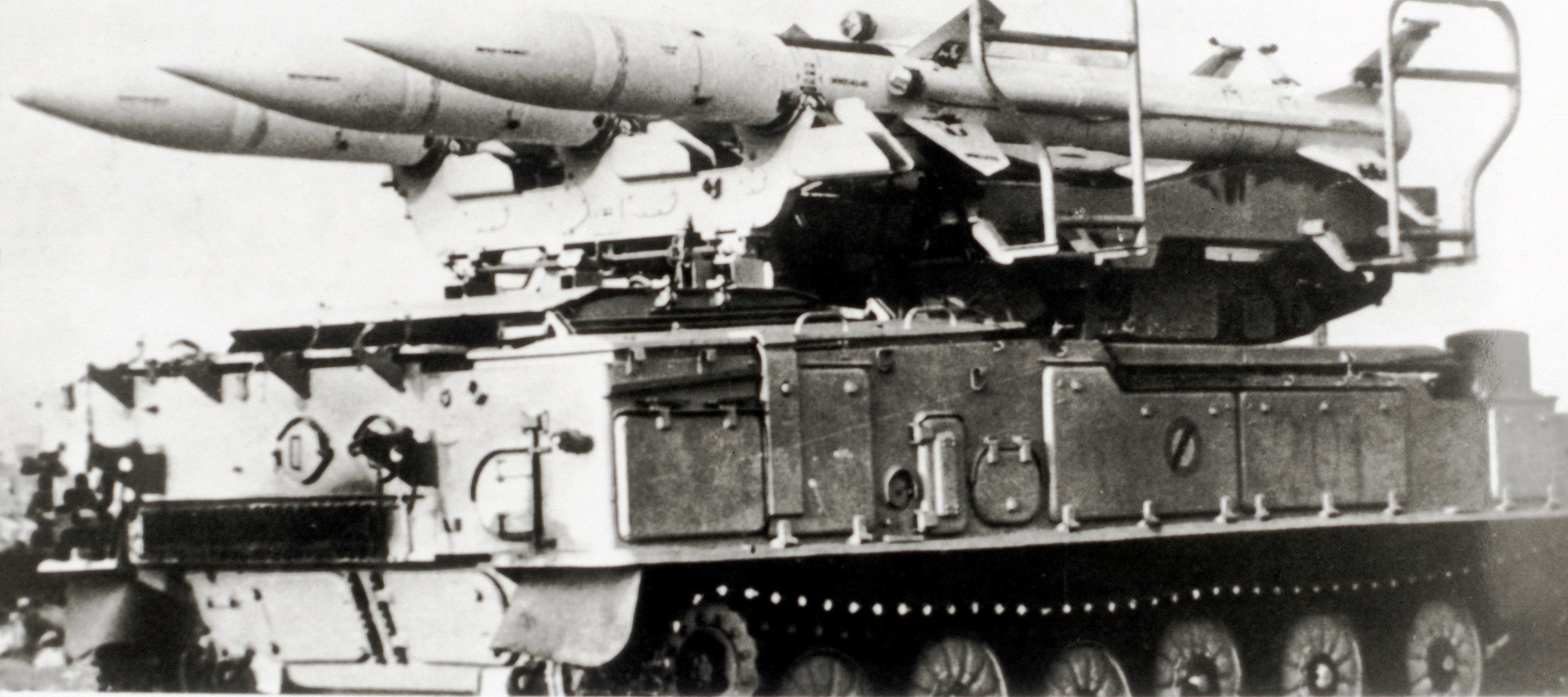
A close-up view of a Soviet-provided Libyan SA-6 surface-to-air missile system. Destroyed in the NATO operation in 2011.

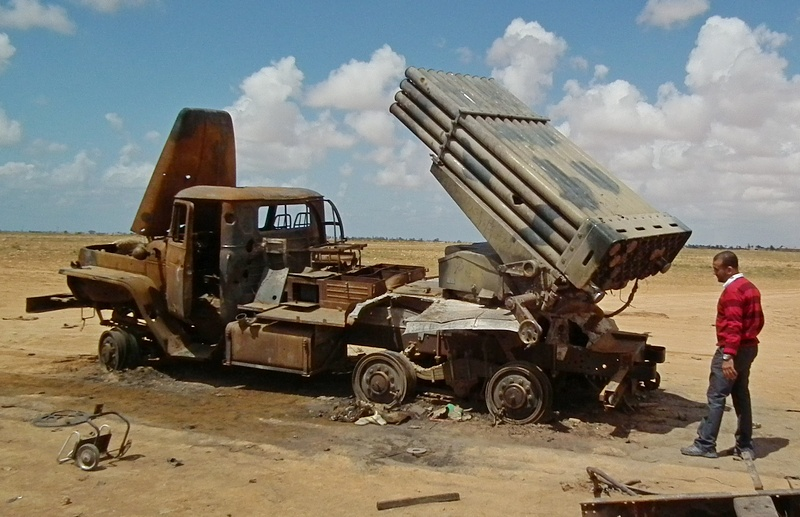
A close-up view of a Soviet-provided Libyan BM-21 Grad missile system. Destroyed in the NATO operation in 2011.

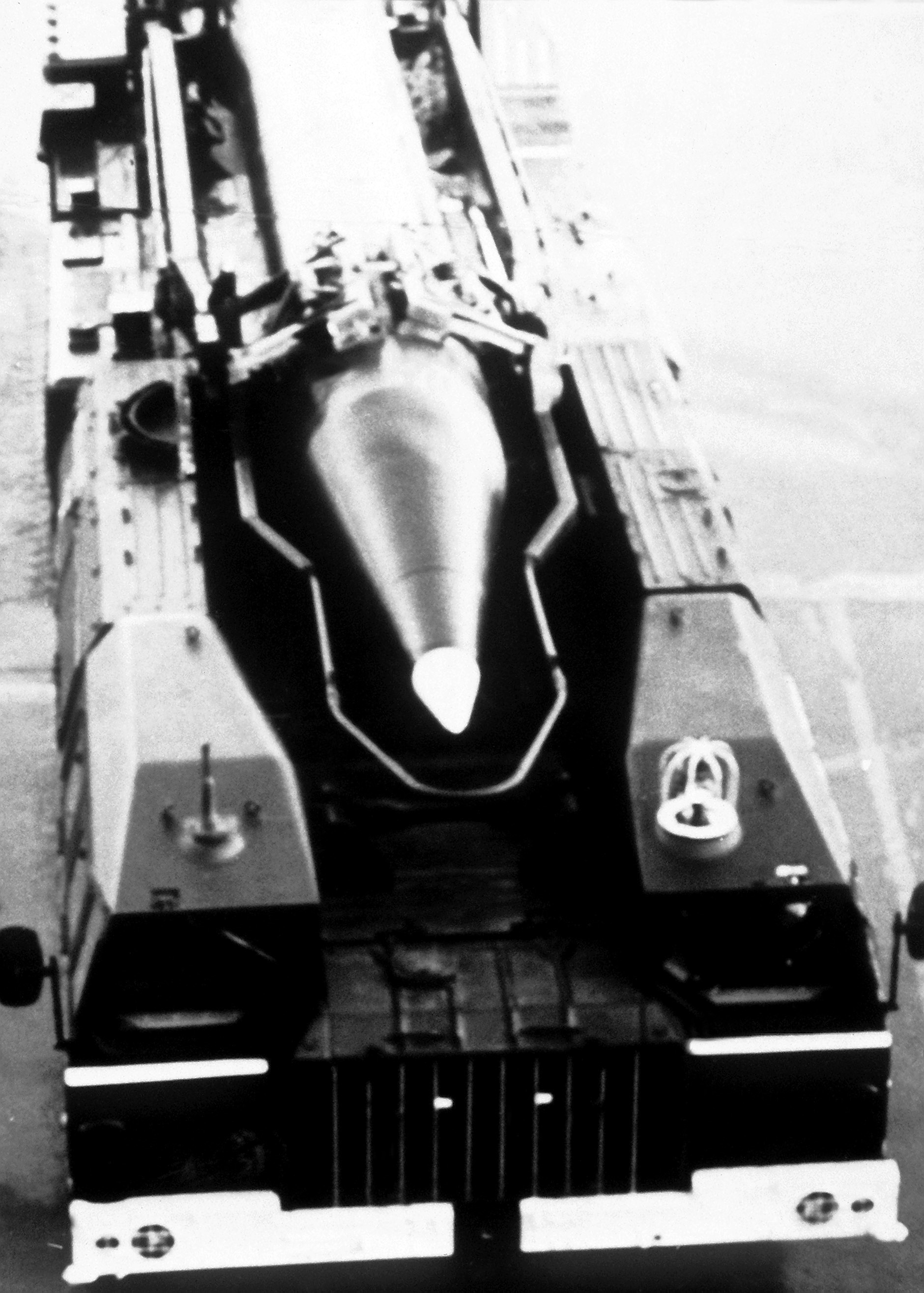
In 1980s, Libya inducted Scud-B missiles from former Soviet Union. Destroyed in the NATO operation in 2011.

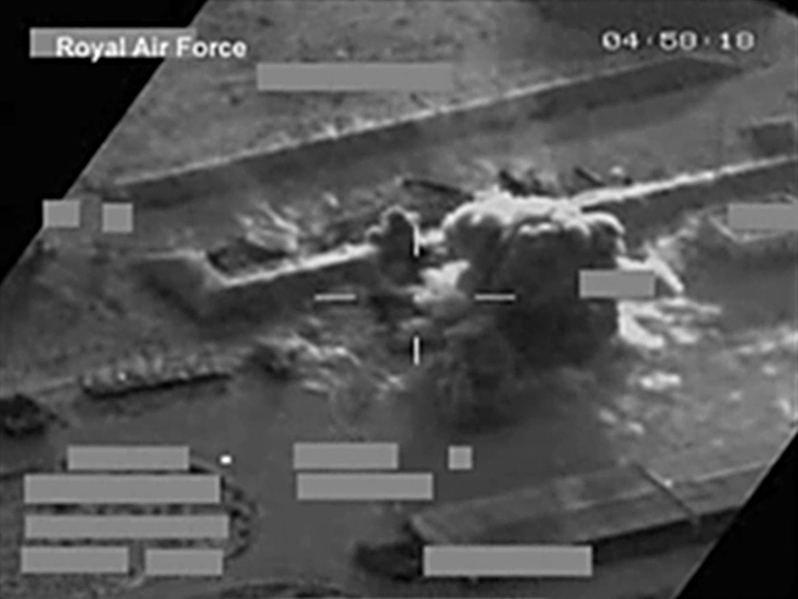
A targeted strike on the Libyan 9K52 Frog-7 system. Destroyed in the NATO operation in 2011.

== See also ==
- Foreign relations of Libya
- Nuclear technology
