= 1998 in Libya =

- Decades: 1970s; 1980s; 1990s; 2000s; 2010s
- See also: Other events of 1998; List of years in Libya

The following lists events that happened during 1998 in Libya.

== Incumbents ==
- President: Muammar al-Gaddafi
- Prime Minister: Muhammad Ahmad al-Mangoush

== Events ==
=== August ===
- August 27 - United Nations Security Council Resolution 1192 is issued, stating that the sanctions in place against Libya since 1992 would be lifted if a tentative plan to try the suspects in the bombings of Pan Am Flight 103 and UTA Flight 772 is followed through upon.
- August 31 - Libyan planes fly to DRC. The government of Libya says it is to evacuate Arab families who went to the Republic of the Congo from DRC.

=== September ===
- September 18 - President of the Democratic Republic of the Congo Laurent Kabila flies to Libya, concerning the UN. The United Nations condemns Libya, Sudan and the DRC for breaches against the UN's air embargo against Libya.
- September 19 - Kabila leaves Tripoli after a visit that violated the UN's embargo on air links with Libya. Again, the United Nations condemns the two countries for this.
- September 20 - Kabila flies to Libya again, as the third time he has violated the UN's air embargo with Libya.

=== November ===
- November 30 - Kabila ends talks with Libyan President Muammar Gaddafi about the Congo conflict and a reported agreement on a ceasefire at the Franco-African summit meeting in Paris.
