= 2010 in Libya =

- Decades: 1990s; 2000s; 2010s; 2020s
- See also: Other events of 2010; List of years in Libya

The following lists events that happened during 2010 in the Great Socialist People's Libyan Arab Jamahiriya.

== Incumbents ==
- President: Muammar Gaddafi
- Prime Minister: Baghdadi Mahmudi

=== February ===
- February 7 - Libya bans YouTube and other news websites in a crackdown of controversial topics, including human rights abuses by the Gaddafi government.
