= 2012 in Libya =

- Decades: 1990s; 2000s; 2010s; 2020s
- See also: Other events of 2012; List of years in Libya

The following lists events that happened in 2012 in Libya.

== Incumbents ==
- Prime Minister: Ali Zeidan (after October 14)

== Events ==
=== February ===
- February 12 - A series of tribal battles begins in Kufra, in southern Libya. More than 100 members of the Toubou people and 20 of the Zuwayya people are killed in the fighting, which would develop into a months-long conflict.

=== March ===
- March 6 - The Cyrenaica region, covering the eastern coast of Libya, announces plans for semi-autonomy.

=== September ===
- September 12 - Mustafa Abushagur is elected as Prime Minister by the General National Congress in a close race. He is expected to take office in October.

=== October ===
- October 7 - Abushagur is dismissed as Prime Minister-elect by Libya's legislature through a no-confidence vote.
- October 14 - Ali Zeidan is elected as Prime Minister.
