= 1997 in Libya =

- Decades: 1970s; 1980s; 1990s; 2000s; 2010s
- See also: Other events of 1997; List of years in Libya

The following lists events that happened in 1997 in Libya.

== Incumbents ==
- President: Muammar al-Gaddafi
- Prime Minister: Abdul Majid al-Qa′ud (until 29 December), Muhammad Ahmad al-Mangoush (starting 29 December)

== Events ==
- 10 March - Vatican City establishes diplomatic relations with Libya.
- April - A flight delivering 105 Muslim pilgrims from Libya to Jeddah, Saudi Arabia causes diplomatic backlash, as it violates a ban on international Libyan flights in place since 1992.
- August - South African President Nelson Mandela visits Libya on a diplomatic mission despite the United States' objections.

== Sport ==
- 1997 Libyan Super Cup
- 1997–98 Libyan Premier League
