= Sana El Mansouri =

Sana Elmansouri
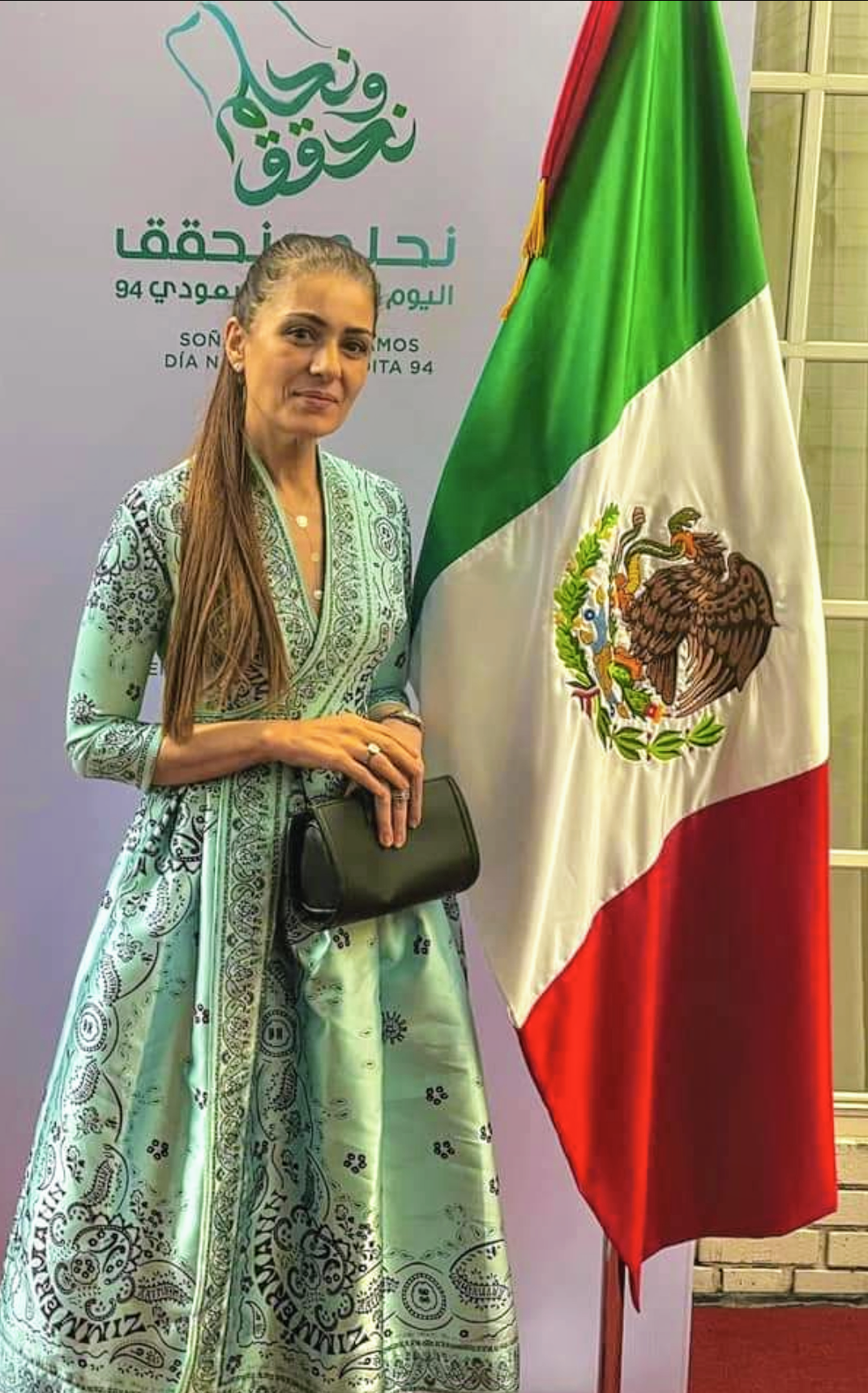
- Elmansouri at the Saudi National Day celebrations in Mexico City

Libyan Ambassador to Mexico
- Incumbent
- Assumed office 3 August 2024
- President: Mohamed al-Menfi
- Prime Minister: Abdul Hamid Dbeibah

Personal details
- Occupation: Ambassador
- Awards: Tripoli Septimus Prize (11 years ago)

Sana Elmansouri is a Libyan diplomat and former journalist, who currently serves as the Libyan Ambassador Extraordinaire to Mexico. She was the first broadcaster in Libya to broadcast programs in the Amazigh language.

She is best known for her program Abrid N Tagrawla (The Road of the Revolution) which was broadcast on Libya Al Ahrar in 2011 during the Libyan Revolution. She also presented and produced the program Libya Al-Nas in Arabic.

Elmansouri was a founding member of the Libyan political party Libou, which she later left. In 2024 she became the Libyan ambassador to Mexico.
