= MI-6 (disambiguation) =

MI6 is the United Kingdom's Secret Intelligence Service.

MI-6 or MI6 may also refer to:

- AMD's MI6, a brand of deep learning oriented Graphics Processing Units, see Radeon Instinct
- Mil Mi-6, a Soviet built transport helicopter
- Michigan's 6th congressional district
- M-6 (Michigan highway)
- MI6.co.uk, former website of the media-website MI6-HQ.com
- Mission: Impossible – Fallout, a 2018 spy-thriller film starring Tom Cruise
- Xiaomi Mi 6, a smartphone developed by Xiaomi
- Return to Monkey Island (also known as Monkey Island 6), videogame

== See also ==
- M16 (disambiguation)
