= 1971 in Libya =

- Decades: 1950s; 1960s; 1970s; 1980s; 1990s
- See also: Other events of 1971; List of years in Libya

The following lists events that happened in 1971 in Libya.

== Incumbents ==
- Prime Minister: Muammar Gaddafi

== Events ==
- 1 September. Referendum on the creation of Federation of Arab Republics.
- 1971–72 Libyan Premier League
