= 2006 in Libya =

- Decades: 1980s; 1990s; 2000s; 2010s; 2020s
- See also: Other events of 2006; List of years in Libya

The following lists events that happened during 2006 in Libya.

== Incumbents ==
- Prime Minister: Shukri Ghanem (until 5 March), Baghdadi Mahmudi (starting 5 March)

== Events ==
=== February ===
- February 8 - Chad and Sudan sign the Tripoli Agreement, proposed by Libya, ending the Chadian-Sudanese conflict.
- February 17 - At least eleven protesters are killed in riots protesting the Muhammad cartoons in Tripoli outside the Italian consulate in Benghazi which was set on fire.

=== May ===
- May 15 - The United States State Department announces it will re-establish diplomatic ties with Libya and remove it from its list of states that sponsor terrorism.

=== July ===
- July 29 - Somali Premier Ali Mohammed Ghedi alleges that Libya, Egypt, and Iran are supplying the Islamic Courts Union with weaponry.
