= 2003 in Libya =

- Decades: 1980s; 1990s; 2000s; 2010s; 2020s
- See also: Other events of 2003; List of years in Libya

The following lists events that occurred in 2003 in Libya.

== Incumbents ==
- President: Muammar al-Gaddafi
- Prime Minister: Imbarek Shamekh (until 14 June), Shukri Ghanem (starting 14 June)
