= 1973 in Libya =

- Decades: 1950s; 1960s; 1970s; 1980s; 1990s
- See also: Other events of 1973; List of years in Libya

The following lists events that happened in 1973 in Libya.

== Incumbents ==
- Prime Minister: Abdessalam Jalloud

== Events ==
- 15 April. Muammar Gaddafi declares a cultural revolution during a speech in Zuwara.
- 19 October. Libya is the first country to declare an oil shipments embargo to the United States.
- 1973–74 Libyan Premier League
