= 1999 in Libya =

- Decades: 1970s; 1980s; 1990s; 2000s; 2010s
- See also: Other events of 1999; List of years in Libya

The following lists events that happened in 1999 in Libya.

== Incumbents ==
- President: Muammar al-Gaddafi
- Prime Minister: Muhammad Ahmad al-Mangoush

== Events ==
- January 23 - The Libyan delegate to the International Olympic Committee resigns as part of the investigation into bribery that led to Salt Lake City being awarded the 2002 Winter Olympics. His son had received scholarships at Utah universities as part of the campaign.
- April 5 - Libya hands over two suspects, reportedly linked to Libyan intelligence, to Dutch authorities for trial in the bombing of Pan Am Flight 103.
- April 8 - The United Nations suspend their sanctions against Libya that had been in place since 1992, as a result of Libya's compliance with the UN's plan to hand over the bombing suspects.
