= 1969 in Libya =

- Decades: 1940s; 1950s; 1960s; 1970s; 1980s
- See also: Other events of 1969; List of years in Libya

The following lists events that happened in 1969 in Libya.

== Incumbents ==
- Monarch: Idris (abdicated 4 August)
- Prime Minister: Wanis al-Qaddafi (until 31 August), Mahmud Sulayman al-Maghribi (starting 8 September)

== Events ==
- 1 September. A young officer named Muammar Gaddafi led a coup that overthrew King Idris's monarchy.
- 7 September. Mahmud Sulayman al-Maghribi is appointed prime minister.
- 8 September. Gaddafi is appointed commander-in-chief of the Libyan Armed Forces.
- December 7, a coup attempt against Gaddafi's government was suppressed. Was led by two ministers, Adam al-Hawaz and Moussa Ahmed, who were later arrested.
- 1969–70 Libyan Premier League, Al-Ahly Benghazi won the championship
