= Mukhabarat el-Jamahiriya =

Former Libyan national intelligence agency

Intelligence of the Jamahiriya
- Mukhabarat el-Jamahiriya

Agency overview
- Dissolved: 2011
- Jurisdiction: Government of Libya
- Headquarters: Tripoli, Libya
- Agency executive: Ali Itbigah, Head of the agency
- Parent agency: Independent

Mukhabarat el-Jamahiriya (Arabic: مخابرات الجماهيرية) (Intelligence of the Jamahiriya) was the national intelligence service of Libya under Muammar Gaddafi. During the First Libyan Civil War, agency director Abuzed Omar Dorda was captured by anti-Gaddafi forces, and the agency ceased to exist when the Jamahiriya was toppled in October 2011.

The agency is believed to have been involved in the 1986 West Berlin discotheque bombing, alongside the Libyan embassy.

In 1988, the agency was accused of causing the bombing of Pan Am Flight 103 over Lockerbie, Scotland, killing 270 people.

== Successor ==
The Intelligence Community under Interim Government:

- External Security Service
- Internal Security Service
- General Directorate of Military Intelligence
