= Friedrich Tinner =

Swiss nuclear engineer (1936–2021)

- Born: November 18, 1936; Bern, Switzerland
- Died: May 3, 2021 (aged 84)
- Citizenship: Switzerland
- Education: Katholieke Universiteit Leuven (Belgium)
- Known for: Libyan nuclear programme Khan network and nuclear proliferation
- Scientific career
- Fields: Nuclear engineering
- Workplaces: Kahuta Research Laboratories (Pakistan); Vacuum Apparatus Technology (VAT)

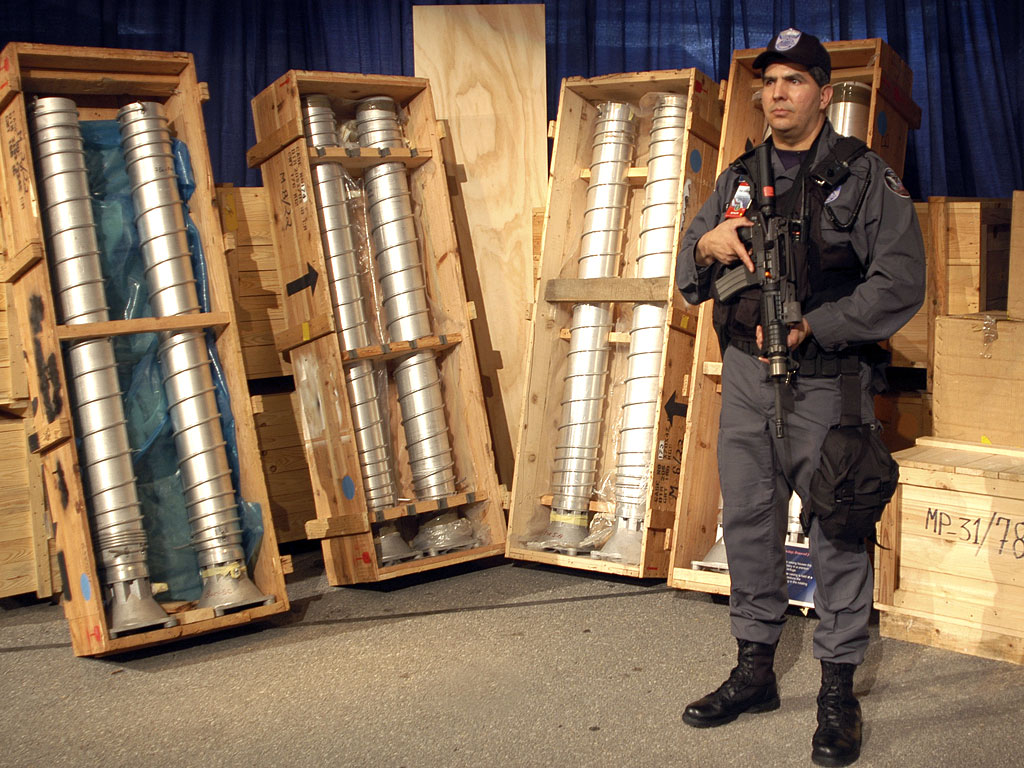
Libyan centrifuges at Oak Ridge in 2003

Friedrich Tinner, also known as Fred Tinner or Fred Tinner-Göldi (18 November 1936 – 3 May 2021) was a Swiss nuclear engineer and a long-associated friend of Abdul Qadeer Khan—Pakistan's former top scientist—and connected with the Khan nuclear network trafficking in the proliferation of nuclear materials and gas centrifuge designs to Iran, Libya, and North Korea. In 2006, Tinner was revealed by the IAEA's investigators as the foreign director and technical head of the Libyan nuclear program. In Libya, Tinner ran the illicit nuclear experiments, using the expertise and technical information he received from his friend Khan, on behalf of the Libyan nuclear program. According to Khan, Tinner was the former researcher of the Kahuta Research Laboratories during the 1970s, when he worked there as a research scientist under the supervision of A. Q. Khan. Tinner was known and connected in particular with gas centrifuge technology used for isotopic enrichment of uranium.

== Education ==
Friedrich Tinner was born in Bern, Switzerland, in 1936 to a Swiss family. He received his early and intermediate education there at Bern where he studied science and mathematics courses at a local school. In 1961, Tinner went to Belgium to attend a technical university to study engineering and attended Katholieke Universiteit Leuven. During this time, Abdul Qadeer Khan was also studying for his master's degree in engineering. It was Tinner's college life when he met with Khan and befriended with him in short time. Tinner and Khan studied at Leuven and stayed in the same dorm room. Tinner received his Master of Science in Nuclear engineering and took a government assignment in Vienna. Even after Khan moved to Netherlands as he joined the URENCO Group, Tinner continued his close association with Khan. After his college years, Tinner went on to work for International Atomic Energy Agency (IAEA) and was made responsible for uranium reactor for the purpose of power generation. Throughout this time, Tinner kept close contact with Dr. A. Q. Khan.

== Nuclear proliferation ==
There are many controversial media and intelligence reports that Friedrich Tinner and his sons, Urs and Marco Tinner, have lived for a long time in Pakistan, where they have worked for Khan Labs as research associates under the supervision of Abdul Qadeer Khan. According to the New York Times, Tinner had a long and close relationship with A. Q. Khan. Tinner and Dr. Khan were college friends in Belgium where they studied together. Tinner, who was working at International Atomic Energy Agency as a uranium expert in the 1980s, resigned from his job and moved to Pakistan, along with his family, where he joined Khan's KRL in early 1980s. The Swiss news agency also reported that Tinner had been working with Dr. Abdul Qadir Khan in mid-1970s, using his expertise in vacuum technology to develop atomic centrifuges.

== Arrest and allegations ==
His then 43-year-old son Urs Tinner was in custody for four years around 2004 as a suspect in the same network. His brother, Marco Tinner, was also in custody for three years on similar charges.

In May, the President of the Swiss Confederation, Pascal Couchepin, announced that the Tinner files, believed to number around 30,000 documents, had been shredded. This was justified to avoid them, "getting into the hands of a terrorist organisation or an unauthorised state", according to Couchepin. However it is alleged that this was a cover-up, to hide the involvement of Urs Tinner with the CIA. Although the Swiss government claimed that the shredding was a security requirement of the IAEA as a measure against nuclear proliferation, it is widely alleged that this was done solely under American pressure, either to hide their involvement or to avoid damage to their own propaganda. Swiss senator Dick Marty has questioned the need for their destruction, pointing out that they could merely have been held secret.

In 2012, all three were released from jail. Marco was sentenced to 41 months in prison, Urs 50 months and their father was given a 24-month suspended sentence. They were released immediately on the basis of time already served.

Tinner died on 3 May 2021, at the age of 84.

== See also ==
- Asher Karni
- Abdul Qadeer Khan
