= M16 (disambiguation) =

M16 is a family of military rifles.

M16 or M-16 may also refer to:

== Firearms and military ==
- M16 mine, an American landmine
- BOV M16 Miloš, a Serbian 4x4 multipurpose armoured vehicle
- Flammenwerfer M.16., a German First World War flamethrower
- Fokker M.16, a 1915 German biplane
- HMS M16, a First World War Royal Navy M15-class monitor
- Grigorovich M-16, a Russian World War I–era biplane flying boat
- Stahlhelm, a German World War I helmet
- M16 (rocket), an American artillery rocket of World War II and the Korean War
- M16 Multiple Gun Motor Carriage, an American self-propelled anti-aircraft weapon

== Transportation ==
=== Aerospace ===
- John Bell Williams Airport, in Raymond, Mississippi
- Magni M-16 Tandem Trainer, an Italian autogyro introduced in 2000
- Macchi M.16, an Italian biplane built in 1919
- Miles M.16 Mentor, a 1930s British monoplane
- Progress M-16, a Russian spacecraft

=== Surface Vehicles ===
- M16 (New York City bus), a former New York City Bus route in Manhattan
- M Scow (M-16), a 16-foot sailboat
- McLaren M16, an IndyCar race car
- Midland M16, a Formula One car run by Midland F1 in 2006

=== Roads ===
- M16 (East London), a Metropolitan Route in East London, South Africa
- M16 (Cape Town), a Metropolitan Route in Cape Town, South Africa
- M16 (Johannesburg), a Metropolitan Route in Johannesburg, South Africa
- M16 (Pretoria), a Metropolitan Route in Pretoria, South Africa
- M16 (Durban), a Metropolitan Route in Durban, South Africa
- M16 (Bloemfontein), a Metropolitan Route in Bloemfontein, South Africa
- M-16 (Michigan highway), now part of U.S. Route 16
- M16 motorway, former designation for parts of the M25 in England
- M-16 motorway (Pakistan), also known as the Swat Expressway
- M16 road (Zambia)
- M16 road (Malawi)
- Highway M16 (Ukraine)

== Other uses ==
- M-16 (album), from German band Sodom
- Messier 16, a nebula also called the Eagle Nebula and its associated star cluster
- M16, a postcode in the M postcode area that covers part of Greater Manchester, England
- Mercedes-AMG F1 M16 E Performance, a 2025-spec Formula One power unit

== See also ==
- M16C, a model of microcontroller by Renesas
- MI6, with a capital "I" instead of the digit "1", the British Secret Intelligence Service
