= Abdul Ati al-Obeidi =

Libyan politician and diplomat (1939–2023)

- عبد العاطي العبيدي
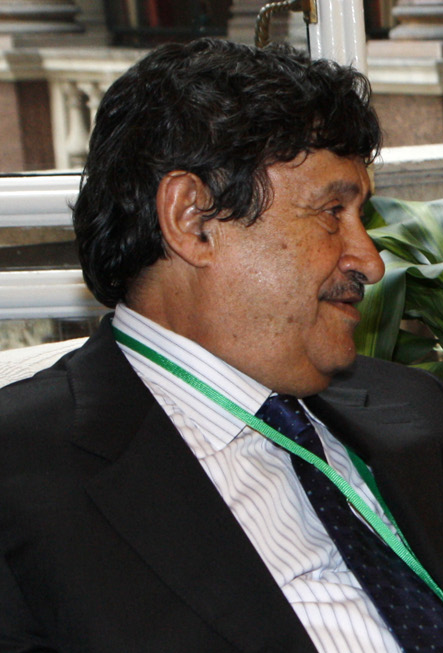
- Obeidi in 2010

Prime Minister of Libya
- In office 2 March 1977 – 2 March 1979
- President: Muammar Gaddafi
- Preceded by: Abdessalam Jalloud
- Succeeded by: Jadallah Azzuz at-Talhi

Secretary-General of the General People's Congress
- In office 2 March 1979 – 7 January 1981
- Leader: Muammar Gaddafi
- Preceded by: Muammar Gaddafi
- Succeeded by: Muhammad az-Zaruq Rajab

Foreign Minister of Libya
- In office 1982–1984
- Preceded by: Ali Treki
- Succeeded by: Ali Treki
- In office 6 April 2011 – 2011
- Preceded by: Moussa Koussa
- Succeeded by: Mahmoud Jibril

Personal details
- Born: 10 October 1939 Jabal al Akhdar, Italian Libya
- Died: 16 September 2023 (aged 83) Tripoli, Libya

Abdul Ati al-Obeidi (/ˈɑːbdəl ˈɑːti ɑːl oʊˈbeɪdi/; Arabic: عبد العاطي العبيدي, romanized: ʿAbd al-ʿĀṭī al-ʿUbayyidī; 10 October 1939 – 16 September 2023) was a Libyan politician and diplomat. He held various top posts in Libya under Muammar Gaddafi; he was Prime Minister from 1977 to 1979 and General Secretary of General People's Congress from 1979 to 1981. He was one of three main negotiators in Libya's decision to denounce and drop their nuclear weapons program.

In 2011, amidst the First Libyan Civil War between Gaddafi loyalists and anti-Gaddafi rebels, he was appointed Foreign Minister after the defection of Moussa Koussa. In fact, he had accompanied Koussa to Djerba, Tunisia before returning to Libya while Koussa defected and went to London. On 3 April 2011 (a week after Koussa's defection), Obeidi flew to Greece to present a peace proposal to his counterpart Dimitrios Droutsas.

On 31 August 2011, he was detained west of Tripoli by rebel forces. In June 2013, a court found him not guilty of a charge of mismanagement.

Abdul Ati al-Obeidi died of a heart attack in Tripoli on 16 September 2023, at the age of 83.

== Career ==
General Secretary of the General People's Committee (Prime Minister)

- 1 March 1977 to 1 March 1979

General Secretary of the General People's Congress (Head of State)

- 2 March 1979 to 7 January 1981

Other positions

- Minister for European Affairs
- Minister of Foreign Affairs: 1982 to 1984; 2011
- Deputy Foreign Minister
- Libyan Ambassador to Tunisia
- Libyan Ambassador to Italy

== See also ==
- History of Libya under Muammar Gaddafi
- Foreign relations of Libya under Muammar Gaddafi
