= Osama Chtiba =

Libyan footballer (born 1988)

Personal information
- Date of birth: September 27, 1988 (age 38)
- Place of birth: Tripoli, Libya
- Height: 1.79 m (5 ft 10 in)
- Position: Centre-back

Team information
- Current team: Al Ahli Tripoli

Senior career*
Years	Team	Apps	(Gls)
2008–2009	Al-Nasr Benghazi		
2009–2011	Al-Ittihad Tripoli		
2011–2012	Nejmeh	8	(0)
2012–2014	Annajma		
2014–2019	Al-Ittihad Tripoli		
2019–	Al Ahli Tripoli		

International career
2009–2018	Libya	18	(0)
Medal record
Men's football
Representing Libya
African Nations Championship
Winner	2014 South Africa
- * Club domestic league appearances and goals

Osama Chtiba (Arabic: أسامة اشطيبة; born 27 September 1988) is a Libyan professional footballer who plays as a centre-back for Libyan club Al Ahli Tripoli.

== Club career ==
In January 2019, Chtiba joined Al Ahli Tripoli.

== Honours ==
Libya

- African Nations Championship: 2014
