= Oujda Treaty =

1984 Morocco–Libya treaty

Arab–African Federation Treaty
- Signed: 13 August 1984
- Location: Oujda, Morocco
- Expired: 30 August 1986
- Signatories: Morocco; Libya

The Oujda Treaty (also known as the Arab–African Federation Treaty) was signed on 13 August 1984 between King Hassan II of Morocco and Muammar Gaddafi of Libya. It was approved by Moroccan voters in a referendum on 31 August, and by the Libyan General People's Congress. Its aim was to establish a "union of states" between the two countries, and eventually to create a "Great Arab Maghreb". However, the union never fully materialized, with Morocco cancelling the treaty in August 1986.

== Structure ==
The treaty did not create a full union between Morocco and Libya, but rather a "loose structure of coordinating bodies". The two heads of state functions as equal chairmen over these bodies. The treaty called for advisory councils on matters such as defense and economics, which would provide their suggestions to an executive committee, who would tasked by the chairmen with implementing the decisions. A joint legislature and court were also included.

== Reaction ==
Algerian diplomats were concerned by the treaty, viewing it as an anti-Algerian alliance and a rejection of any diplomatic resolution of the Western Sahara conflict. Algerian officials reportedly had been approached with a similar treaty by the Moroccan government in May 1984, but no agreement was reached due in part to Algerian concerns about the Western Sahara.

The treaty startled the administration of US President Ronald Reagan, who pointed out Libya's untrustworthy reputation and called Gaddafi "an instigator of international terrorism". Other western countries, including Spain and France, also expressed their discomfort.

== Cancellation ==
The treaty was cancelled by Morocco on 30 August 1986. The stated reason was Morocco's objection to Libya's criticism of Morocco hosting Shimon Peres, the Prime Minister of Israel. Gaddafi had called Peres's visit an "act of treason" and a "violation of the Arab consensus". The United States had also put diplomatic pressure on Morocco to end the union.

== See also ==
- Djerba Declaration, establishing a similarly short-lived and imprecise union between Libya and Tunisia (1974)
- Arab Maghreb Union, an extant economic union and trade agreement between Morocco, Libya, and other Maghrebi nations
