= 1979 U.S. Embassy Burning in Libya =

Terrorist incident in Tripoli, Libya

On 2 December 1979, the U.S. Embassy in Tripoli, Libya, was burned during protests over allegations that the United States was involved in the Grand Mosque seizure in Mecca, Saudi Arabia.

The United States had already withdrawn the U.S. Ambassador to Libya in 1972. Following the 1979 attack, all remaining U.S. government personnel were withdrawn and the embassy closed. Diplomatic presence resumed on February 8, 2004, with the arrival of the U.S. Interests Section in Tripoli. That mission was upgraded to a Liaison Office on June 24, 2004.

== Sources ==
- Office of the Spokesman Upgrading of Diplomatic Relations with Libya U.S. Department of State. May 15, 2006.

== See also ==
- 1979 U.S. embassy burning in Islamabad
- Attacks on the United States
