= Abdel Rahman Shalgham =

Libyan politician and diplomat (born 1949)

- عبد الرحمن شلقم
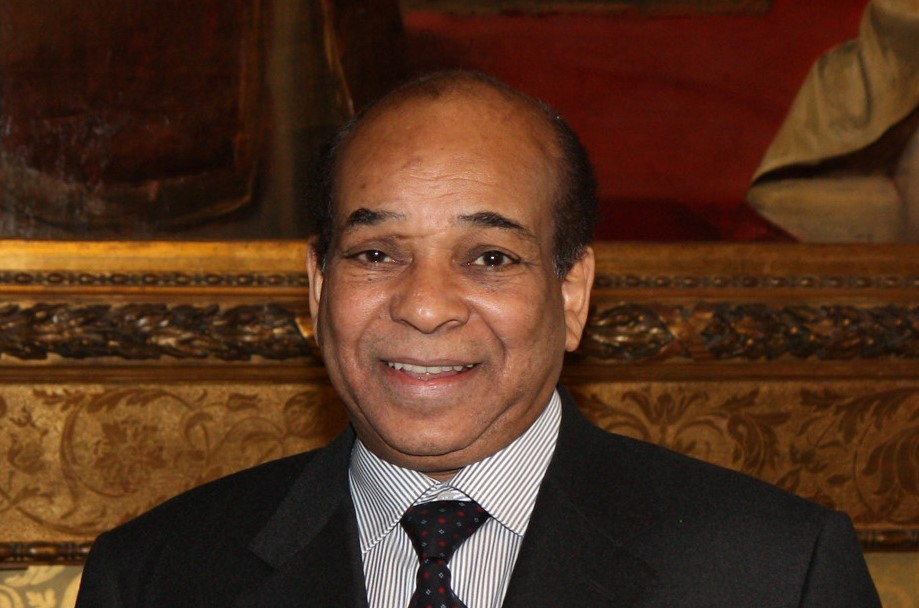

Minister of Foreign Affairs of Libya
- In office 16 July 2000 – 4 March 2009
- Preceded by: Umar Mustafa al-Muntasir
- Succeeded by: Moussa Koussa

Personal details
- Born: 22 November 1949 (age 76) Sabha, Libya

Abdel Rahman Shalgam (Note: Arabic: عبد الرحمن شلقم) (born 22 January 1949) is a Libyan politician. He was Foreign Minister of Libya from 2000 to 2009.

== Early life ==
Shalgam was born in Sabha in southern Libya.

== Political career ==
In 1973, he worked for DAWN newspaper.

From 1984 to 1995, before being appointed foreign minister, Shalgam was Secretary (Ambassador) of Libya's People's Bureau (Libyan Embassy) to Rome, Italy.

From 1998 to 2000 he was Secretary of Foreign Affairs at the Secretariat of the General People's Congress of Libya.

During Shalgham's tenure of office, a relative thaw in US-Libyan relations came about, with high-level contacts being maintained between Libya and the State Department.

Shalgham was replaced as Foreign Minister by Moussa Koussa on 4 March 2009 and was instead appointed Libya's representative at the United Nations Security Council, where Libya had a non-permanent seat until 31 December 2009. He remains Libya's ambassador to the UN as of early 2011.

=== Role in Libyan civil war ===
After the outbreak of the Libyan Civil War in February 2011, Shalgham initially sided with Muammar Gaddafi, with whom he had been friends for many years. He continued to side with Gaddafi as late as 22 February. On that day, he confirmed that civilians had not been the target of bombing (contrary to initial reports), but demanded that the violence stop. "If one Libyan has been killed - not ten or 20 - but one," Shalgram said at a press conference held that day, "this is a crime."

On 25 February, however, Shalgham denounced Gaddafi in an emotional speech before the United Nations Security Council. Most of the UN's Libyan delegation had abandoned Gaddafi four days earlier. Shalgham initially "could not believe" Gaddafi was firing on his own people, but could no longer support his government after Gaddafi publicly called for the protests to be put down by force. Partly due to his lobbying, the Security Council passed Resolution 1970, which imposed harsh sanctions against Libya and referred the situation to the International Criminal Court. Shalgham applauded the resolution, saying it would "help put an end to this fascist regime, which is still in existence in Tripoli."

On 5 March 2011, Shalgam was appointed emissary to the UN by the National Transitional Council. Earlier that day, the Gaddafi-led government had notified the UN of its desire to replace Shalgam as the Libyan representative, appointing Ali Treki as its new envoy in his place.
