= Umar Mustafa Al Muntasir =

Libyan politician (1939–2001)

Prime Minister of Libya
- In office 1 March 1987 – 7 October 1990
- Preceded by: Jadallah Azzuz at-Talhi
- Succeeded by: Abuzed Omar Dorda

Foreign Minister of Libya
- In office 13 August 1992 – 16 July 2000
- Preceded by: Ibrahim al-Bishari
- Succeeded by: Abdel Rahman Shalgham

Personal details
- Born: 1939 Libya
- Died: 23 January 2001 (aged 61–62) Libya

Umar Mustafa Al Muntasir (Arabic: عمر مصطفى المنتصر) (1939 – 23 January 2001) was secretary of the General People's Committee (Prime Minister) of the Libyan Arab Jamahiriya from 1 March 1987 to 7 October 1990. He succeeded Jadallah Azzuz at-Talhi as secretary of the General People's Committee in a cabinet reshuffle. Al Muntasir also served as the foreign minister from 13 August 1992 until 16 July 2000. Umar Mustafa died of natural causes on 23 January 2001.
