= Abuzed Omar Dorda =

Former Prime Minister of Libya (1944–2022)

Abuzed Dorda
- أبو زيد عمر دوردة

Prime Minister of Libya
- In office 7 October 1990 – 29 January 1994
- Preceded by: Umar Mustafa al-Muntasir
- Succeeded by: Abdul Majid al-Qa′ud

Personal details
- Born: 4 April 1944 Rhebat, British Military Administration of Tripolitania (now Libya)
- Died: 28 February 2022 (aged 77) Cairo, Egypt

Abuzed Omar Dorda (Arabic: أبو زيد عمر دوردة; 4 April 1944 – 28 February 2022) was a Libyan politician who was the General Secretary of the People's Committee (Prime Minister) of Libya from 7 October 1990 to 29 January 1994, and Libya's Permanent Representative to the United Nations from 1997 to 2003.

== Life and career ==
Dorda entered politics as Governor of Misrata District in 1970, serving in that capacity until 1972. Next, he served as Minister of Information and Culture until 1974, and as Undersecretary of Foreign Affairs, until 1976. In 1990, he became Prime Minister and in 1997 he became Libya's Permanent Representative at the UN.

On 12 April 2009, it was reported that Dorda had been appointed to head the Mukhabarat el-Jamahiriya (national intelligence agency), replacing Moussa Koussa.

On 31 March 2011, it was reported that he had been in Tunisia, awaiting a flight out of there, in an attempt to defect from Gaddafi's government, and in the background of the Libyan civil war. He was a part of Gaddafi's inner circle. He was arrested by NTC forces on 11 September 2011. During his detention, Dorda was severely injured (both legs broken) after falling from the window of the second floor of the prison. While his family believed he survived an assassination attempt, prison officials claimed he tried to commit suicide. He was released in February 2019 for health reasons and immediately left for Tunisia en route to Egypt.

In June 2021, Dorda allegedly met with Khalifa Haftar in Cairo.

Dorda died in Cairo on 28 February 2022, at the age of 77.
