= Jadallah Azzuz at-Talhi =

Libyan diplomat and politician (1939–2024)

Jadallah at-Talhi
- جاد الله عزوز الطلحي

Secretary-General of the People's Committee
- In office 3 March 1986 – 1 March 1987
- Preceded by: Muhammad az-Zaruq Rajab
- Succeeded by: Umar Mustafa al-Muntasir
- In office 2 March 1979 – 16 February 1984
- Preceded by: Abdul Ati al-Obeidi
- Succeeded by: Muhammad az-Zaruq Rajab

Foreign Minister of Libya
- In office 1987–1990
- Preceded by: Kamel Maghur
- Succeeded by: Ibrahim Al Bishari

Personal details
- Born: 1939 Cyrenaica, Italian Libya
- Died: 15 June 2024 (aged 85) Benghazi, Libya

Jadallah Azzuz at-Talhi (Arabic: جاد الله عزوز الطلحي, romanized: Jād Allāh ʿAzzūz al-Ṭalḥī; 1939 – 15 June 2024) was a Libyan diplomat and politician who served as Secretary-General of the General People's Committee of Libya for two terms.

== Education ==
Born in 1939, Talhi obtained a geology degree from Louvain University.

== Career ==
Talhi was a Minister of Industry and Mineral Resources from July 1972 until March 1977.

=== Secretary-General ===
Talhi was Secretary-General of the People's Committee in Libya for two terms, first from 2 March 1979 to 16 February 1984, then from September 1986 to 1 March 1987. In March 1987 Umar Mustafa al-Muntasir succeeded him.

=== Foreign minister ===
Talhi served as foreign minister of Libya in the late 1980s, replacing Kamel Maghur as foreign minister. In September 1987, he visited Baghdad to reestablish foreign relations and participated in the creation of the Arab Maghreb Union. His tenure lasted until 1990.

==== Paris Conference ====
Talhi met with U.S. Secretary of State George P. Shultz at the Paris Conference in January 1989 at UNESCO's headquarters. He denied the accusation by the United States that Libya was creating chemical weapons in Rabta, and accused it of knowing the location of chemical weapons in the Middle East. He also highlighted an international relationship between Israel and the United States in regards to the development of nuclear weapons.

== Death ==
Talhi died in Benghazi on 15 June 2024, at the age of 85.
