= 2020 in Libya =

- Decades: 2000s; 2010s; 2020s
- See also: Other events of 2020; List of years in Libya

Events in Libya in 2020

== Incumbents ==
- President: Fayez al-Sarraj
- Prime Minister: Abdullah al-Thani

== Events ==
=== January ===
- January 2
  - The Grand National Assembly of Turkey passes a one-year mandate in order to deploy troops to Libya.
- January 5
  - Turkey starts to deploy troops in Libya.
- January 6
  - Turkey sends troops and electronic warfare tools to Libya to defend the existing government there after the LNA captures Sirte.
  - Several countries protest against Turkey's actions in Libya including Greece, France, Egypt, and the United States.
- January 7
  - Rebel groups commanded by Khalifa Haftar capture the coastal city of Sirte.
- January 8
  - Turkish president Erdogan and Russian President Vladimir Putin call for a cease-fire in Libya.

=== February ===
- February 8
  - The first round of UN-brokered talks led by the Libyan 5+5 Joint Military Commission concluded in Geneva, Switzerland without a full ceasefire agreement.
- February 16
  - Representatives from a dozen countries meet in Germany to discuss withholding weapons from warring factions in Libya.
- February 18
  - The National Liberation Army shelled the Port of Tripoli, killing three civilians. The Government of National Accord suspended negotiations with the National Liberation Army in response.

=== March ===
- March 2
  - The U.N. envoy to Libya, Ghassan Salamé, 69, steps down because of health concerns. Peace efforts seem further off than ever.
- March 24
  - Libya confirms its first COVID-19 case.

=== April ===
- April 27 – Khalifa Haftar and the Libyan National Army (LNA) move to seize control of the country and the Kremlin reaffirms its support for a diplomatic solution. Hafter is supported by Russia, the United Arab Emirates, and Egypt. The Government of National Accord (GNA) is recognized by most other countries internationally.

=== May ===
- May 6 – Russian mercenaries from the Wagner Group, a Russian paramilitary organization seen as being close to Vladimir Putin, are fighting in Libya, UN diplomats say.
- May 23 – U.S. President Donald Trump calls upon Turkey President Recep Erdogan to push Khalifa Haftar for de-escalation. Haftar is a U.S. citizen.
- May 26 – The U.S. (AFRICOM) says Russia has sent fighter jets to Tripoli to support the mercenaries trying to topple the government. Russia says this is ″disinformation.″

=== June ===
- June 3 – The internationally recognized government of Libya retakes Tripoli International Airport. Egypt and the UAE, both backers of military commander Khalifa Haftar, support the ceasefire announced on June 2.
- June 12 – Explosive devices, landmines, and mass graves of civilians, many buried alive, are discovered in the city of Tarhuna, Murqub District after the city is taken by GNA forces.
- June 27 – Ninety-three migrants are rescued off Libyan shores as they tried to reach Europe, but six others died along the way.

=== July ===
- July 10 – Haftar's Libyan National Army allows a tanker to load about 730,000 barrels of crude from the eastern port of Es Sider, with the cargo bound for Italy.
- July 12 – Khalifa Haftar vows to blockade ports and the National Oil Corp. reimposed force majeure. At least three oil firms stopped production or canceled plans to restart.

=== August ===
- August 21 – The GNA and the LNA both declared a ceasefire.

=== November ===
- November 12 – The International Organization for Migration (IOM) reports a shipwreck off the coast of Khums, Libya, which claimed the lives of over 74 migrants. The boat was reported to be carrying over 120 people. Forty-seven survivors have been brought to shore by the coast guard and fishermen. It is the eighth such incident since the beginning of October.
- November 16 – Libya Civil War: UN-sponsored peace talks failed to establish an interim government by November 16, although both sides pledged to try again in a week.

=== December ===
- December 8 – Forces controlled by Khalifa Hifter seize a Turkish ship near Derna, Libya.
- December 17 – Eighteen fishermen held since September 1 for invading Libyan waters are released.
- December 21 – Lockerbie bombing: The United States accuses Abu Agila Masud of the 1988 bombing and requests his extradition. Masud is serving a ten-year sentence for a separate bomb attack.
- December 25 – Warring factions begin a prisoner exchange in al-Shwayrif.

== Events by issue ==
=== Turkish troops deployed to Libya ===
In January 2020, Turkey sent troops and electronic warfare tools to Libya to defend the existing government there. Several countries protested against Turkey's actions including Greece, France, Egypt, and the United States.

In July, the United States said it had verifiable photographs showing Russia has sent weapons, air defense systems, and mercenaries to Libya. Russia, the United Arab Emirates, Egypt, and France support Khalifa Hifter's forces. Turkey has sent arms and Syrian mercenaries to back the government of Tripoli.

Khalifa Hifter threatened to use force against Turkish troops after the Turkish parliament extended authorization that allows the deployment of Turkish troops to Libya for another 18 months starting December 2020.

== Deaths ==
- 5 April – Mahmoud Jibril, 67, politician, Minister of Foreign Affairs and Prime Minister (2011); COVID-19
- 21 April – Abdurrahim El-Keib, 70, politician, acting Prime Minister (2011–2012); heart attack
- 6 October – Suleiman Mahmoud, 71, military officer, Chief of Staff of the National Liberation Army (2011); COVID-19.
- 10 November – Hanane Al-Barassi, activist; gunshot.

== See also ==
- 2020 in North Africa
- 2020s in political history
- Libya
- History of Libya
- Outline of Libya
- Government of Libya
- Politics of Libya

=== Specific issues ===
- Libyan Civil War
- al-Qaeda in the Islamic Maghreb
- Ansar al-Sharia (Libya)
- Second Libyan Civil War
- Turkish military intervention in the Second Libyan Civil War
- Slavery in Libya
- COVID-19 pandemic in Libya
