= 2021 in Libya =

- Decades: 2000s; 2010s; 2020s
- See also: Other events of 2021; List of years in Libya

Events in Libya in 2021.

== Incumbents ==
- President: Fayez al-Sarraj (until 15 March), Mohamed al-Menfi (starting 15 March)
- Prime Minister:
  - Abdullah al-Thani (until 5 February)
  - Abdul Hamid al-Dabaib (interim, starting 5 February)

== Events ==
Yearlong – COVID-19 pandemic in Libya, Libyan Crisis, Second Libyan Civil War

=== January ===
- January 5 – The Libyan dynar (national currency) drops from being worth .746 to .225 US dollars.
- January 13 – Rival governments meet for talks aimed at unifying the national budget.
- January 15 – The United Nations Security Council names Ján Kubiš, a former Slovak foreign minister, as its new envoy to Libya.
- January 19 – Political rivals begin talks under United Nations auspicies to lay the groundwork for a legal foundation for elections on December 24.
- January 28 – The United States calls for the immediate withdrawal of Russian and Turkish troops.
- July 30 – The coastal highway between Misrata and Sirte, which serves as the primary transport artery linking western and eastern Libya, was officially reopened following negotiations by the 5+5 Joint Military Commission, ending a closure lasting over two years since the 2019–2020 Western Libya campaign.

=== February ===
- February 5
  - Abdul Hamid Dbeibah is chosen as transitional unity prime minister of Libya.
  - The International Organization for Migration says 800 European-bound migrants were intercepted by the Libyan Navy in the last 24 hours.
- February 18 – Egyptian President Abdel Fattah el-Sisi and Prime Minister Abdul Hamid Mohammed Dbeibah meet in Cairo.
- February 21 – Armed gunmen attack Interior Minister Fathi Bashagha's motorcade in Tripoli.
- February 22 – Authorities free 156 victims of human trafficking from Somalia, Eritrea, and Sudan in Kufra. Six traffickers are arrested.
- February 28 – Fifteen people drown and 115, mostly migrants, are saved when a rubber boat sank near Zawiya. 41 people had drowned in a similar incident on February 20.

=== March ===
- March 3
  - Agence France-Presse says a confidential UN report finds Prime Minister Abdul Hamid Dbeibah was elected after bribing at least three people. Dbeibah says the report is untrue.
  - The government says migration is not a top priority and calls upon international organizations to step up monitoring and rescue efforts.
- March 7 – Parliamentarians from both sides arrive in Sirte to discuss the formation of a unity government.
- March 10 – Parliament approves Abdulhamid Dbeibeh's interim cabinet 132–2.
- March 31 – Two women and three migrant children drown when a boat capsizes. 77 others are rescued. 480 migrants were rescued over the weekend.

=== April ===
- April 23 – The International Organization for Migration (IOM) reports that a shipwreck off the coast of Libya claims the lives of 130 migrants.

=== September ===
- September 3 – Fighting breaks out between different factions in Tripoli as tensions rise throughout the country.

== Predicted and scheduled events ==
- March 29 – France is scheduled to reopen its embassy after seven years.
- December 24 – elections
  - 2021 Libyan presidential election
  - 2021 Libyan parliamentary elections

== Sports ==
- March 26 – After seven years, international football returns to Libya. The Libyan national team lost 5–2 in an Africa Cup of Nations qualification match in ″Benina Martyrs Stadium″ (formerly ″Hugo Chávez Stadium″) near Benghazi.

== Deaths ==
- March 24 – Mahmoud al-Werfalli, suspected war criminal (Libyan National Army); shot

== See also ==
- COVID-19 pandemic in Africa
- 2021 in North Africa
- 2020s in political history
- Government of Libya
- Politics of Libya
- Turkish military intervention in the Second Libyan Civil War
- Slavery in Libya
