= Domestic responses to the Libyan civil war (2011) =

The Libyan flag used between 1951 and 1969 was used by protesters as an opposition flag. It was readopted as the national flag after the rebels' victory.

During the early stages of the Libyan Civil War of 2011, the Gaddafi regime was still in power: but there was widespread withdrawal of support for that regime by influential persons and organisations within the country. Among those who no longer supported the regime, the main concern they expressed was about what they regarded as its use of excessive force against peaceful protestors. There were resignations by many ministers of the governing council and other senior officials, diplomats posted abroad, and senior military officers. Islamic clerics, tribal leaders, and members of the former royal family expressed their opposition, while the two leading Libyan oil companies also withdrew support for the regime.

== Government resignations ==
This is a list of officials who resigned or refused to take orders from the Gaddafi regime during the 2011 Libyan civil war.

=== Ministers ===
- Minister for Immigration and Expatriates Ali Errishi, resigned 20 February 2011
- Justice Minister Mustafa Abdul Jalil, resigned 21 February 2011. He announced that he had evidence about Gadhafi's order in 1988 to bomb Pan-Am Flight 103.
- Interior Minister and Army General Abdul Fatah Younis, defected 22 February 2011 as he announced his support for the protestors. Later he was appointed by rebels as a head of the opposite armed forces, and was reported dead by Libya's National Transitional Council (NTC) in July the same year.
- Foreign Affairs Minister Moussa Koussa, resigned and fled to Britain on 30 March 2011
- Oil Minister Shukri Ghanem defected mid-May 2011 and arrived in Rome two weeks later
- Libyan Labour Minister, Al-Amin Manfur, defected and joined the opposition at a meeting of the International Labour Organization in Geneva, Switzerland.
- Interior Minister, Nasr al-Mabrouk Abdallah, allegedly left to Tunisia on 14 August 2011. On 15 August, he arrived in Cairo by plane with nine of his family members without any advance warning, according to Egyptian airport officials; he claimed to be "on a tourist visit". Abdallah, a military general, succeeded to the post of interior minister following Abdul Fatah Younis' resignation and defection to the rebel side, and had preceded Younis to the position in an earlier term of appointment.

=== Other officials ===
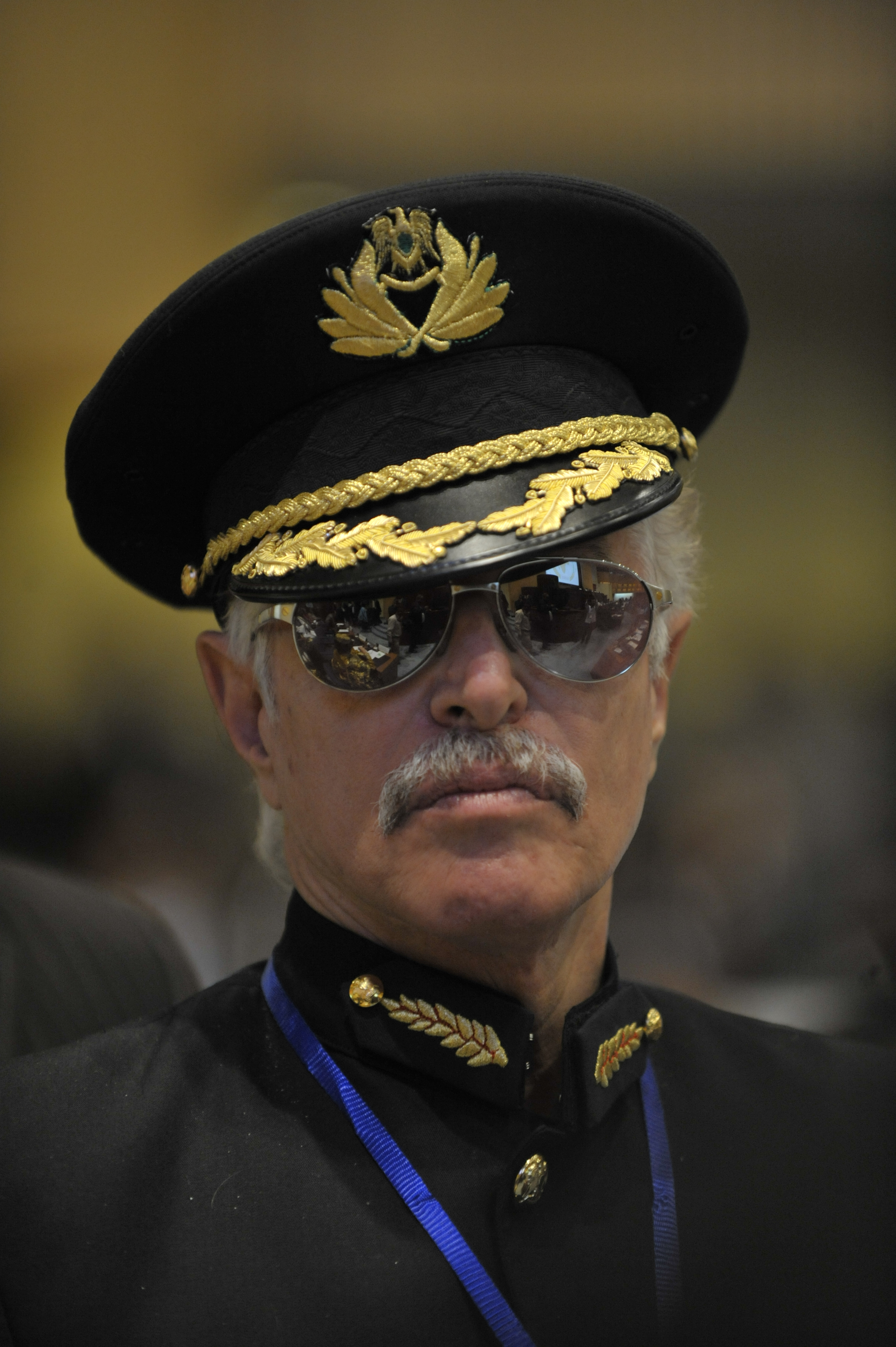
Nuri al-Mismari at the 12th African Union summit

- Nuri al-Mismari, former head of protocol
- Ahmed Gaddaf al-Dam, a cousin and aide of Gaddafi has fled to Cairo reporting of "grave violations to human right and human and international laws."
- Abdul-Rahman al-Abbar, Libyan Prosecutor General resigned on 25 February 2011 and joined the opposition.
- Mohamed Amer Bayou, spokesman for the Gaddafi regime, resigned on 25 February over violence against protesters.
- Youssef Sawani, a senior aide to Muammer Gaddafi's son Saif al-Islam Gaddafi, resigned from his post "to express dismay against violence".

=== Diplomatic service ===
Host country/ Organization	Official	Date	Notes
Arab League	Ambassador Abdulmoneim al-Honi	20 February 2011	The reason for his resignation was the "oppression against protesters".
Arab League	The Libyan delegation to the Arab League in Cairo has renounced Gaddafi and now represents 'the people'	25 February 2011	They condemned his attack on "unarmed citizens".
United Nations	Ambassador Abdel Rahman Shalgham	25 February 2011	Did not resign, but denounced Gaddafi in a speech before the Security Council and no longer supports the regime.
United Nations	Deputy Ambassador Ibrahim Dabbashi	21 February 2011	Did not resign, but no longer supports government. On 26 February 2011, he stated that he supported "in principle" the alternative government being formed in Benghazi.
United Nations	Delegation to the Human Rights Council; Entire mission to the UN in Geneva	25 February 2011	
UNESCO	Ambassador Abdoulsalam El Qallali	25 February 2011	
Australia	Musbah Allafi	20 February 2011	
Austria	Embassy staff	23 February 2011	The Libyan Embassy in Austria condemned 'excessive violence against peaceful demonstrators', stated that they represent the Libyan people and offered condolences to the families of the victims.
Bangladesh	Ambassador AH Elimam	20 February 2011	
Belgium	Ambassador	21 February 2011	
Canada	Counsellor Ihab Al-Mismari	23 February 2011	Son of Gaddafi's former protocol chief Nuri al-Mismari told the Toronto Star he resigned because embassy's chargé d'affaires was "hiding" the gravity of the deadly crackdown back home. “...killing the friends with whom I grew up, they are killing my brothers and sisters.”
China	Second Secretary to the ambassador Hussein Sadiq al Musrati	20 February 2011	He also called on the army to intervene and called for all Libya's diplomats to resign
Egypt	Consular employees in Alexandria	22 February 2011	Staff at the Libyan consulate in Alexandria removed the Gaddafi-era green flag and joined protestors outside
Egypt	Consul in Cairo Faraj Saeed al-Aribi	12 May 2011	The consul in Cairo said that he had quit his job and joined the rebels
European Union and Benelux	Ambassador Hadeiba Alhadi and Embassy staff	25 May 2011	
France	Ambassador Mohamed Salaheddine Zarem	25 February 2011	
Hungary	Embassy staff (undefined)	22 February 2011	Two members of the staff left the embassy to join the protesters in front of the building. On 21 March, the Libyan embassy in Budapest is seen flying the old tricolor flag which indicates that they have officially changed sides in favor of the National Transitional Council.
India	Ambassador Ali al-Essawi	21 February 2011	
Indonesia	Ambassador Salaheddin M. El Bishari	21 February 2011	
Jordan	Ambassador Mohammed Hassan Al Barghathi	24 February 2011	
Malaysia	Embassy staff	22 February 2011	Distanced themselves from the government and called the protests a "massacre."
Mali	Consul general Musa Al-Koni (later referred as "Musa Kuni")	5 March 2011	Later accused by Malian officials of being an "impostor" who initially recruited Tuareg mercenaries before fleeing to Paris with the money entrusted to him for that purpose.
Malta	Embassy staff	22 February 2011	Left the embassy to join the protestors in front of it. The embassy is now flying the flag of the protestors.
Morocco	Embassy staff	23 February 2011	Staff destroyed images of Muammar Gaddafi and destroyed the Gaddafi-era flag.
Namibia	Second-highest ranking diplomat Saad Bakar	3 March 2011	The second-highest ranking diplomat in Namibia, Saad Bakar, his wife and four children has left for a Mediterranean country to join the opposition movement.
Netherlands	Embassy staff	8 March 2011	Replacement of the Gaddafi-era flag with the Libyan 1951–1969 flag as used by the 2011 protesters; no further comments were made.
Poland	Ambassador	22 February 2011	
Portugal	Ambassador Ali Ibrahim Emdored	25 February 2011	
Somalia	Ambassador Issa Ashur	26 February 2011	Announced he is "joining the revolution", and would continue to carry out his duties "as a representative of the Libyan people"
Sweden	Ambassador; Deputy Ambassador Abdelmagid Buzrigh; non-diplomatic staff	23 February 2011	After days of protests, the embassy announced on 23 February that they no longer support Gaddafi and lifted the former Libyan flag
Switzerland	Embassy staff	11 March 2011	"The members of the embassy no longer have any link to the regime of Muammar Gaddafi, and call on all countries to follow the example set by the Republic of France in recognising the National Transitional Council which represents the interests of the Libyan people".
United States of America	Ambassador Ali Suleiman Aujali;	22 February 2011	However, he resigned on 22 February saying he does not serve the "dictatorship." On 26 February 2011, he stated that he supported the efforts to form an alternative government in Benghazi.

Contrary to previous reports, the ambassador of Libya to the United Kingdom has not resigned, but did not want to discuss his support for Libyan leader Muammar Gaddafi.

According to the Toronto Star, the ambassador of Libya to Canada is on "sick leave". According to the CNN Library, which was updated on March 29, 2017 "Libyan diplomats at the United Nations, including Libyan Deputy Ambassador Ibrahim Dabbashi, took the side of the opposition and demanded the removal of "the tyrant Moammar Gadhafi."
On February 25, 2011, the full Libyan delegation to the Arab League resigned.

A growing number of Libyan embassies around the world have started to fly the former flag of Libya used between 1951 and 1969.

=== Military ===
- Abdul Fatah Younis, interior minister who resigned and defected, held the position of major general, and was the top military leader.
- Major General Suleiman Mahmoud whom Al Jazeera describes as "a commander of the Libyan army in Tobruk" called Colonel Gaddafi "a tyrant" and announced that he and his forces changed sides towards the protestors.
- On 1 March, Brigadier Musa’ed Ghaidan Al Mansouri the head of the Al Wahat Security Directorate and Brigadier Hassan Ibrahim Al Qarawi defected to the anti-government side.
- Brigadier Dawood Issa Al Qafsi also said that he "join[s] the Feb 17 revolution. With me are officers, non commissioned officers and soldiers in the Armed Forces units in Ajdabiya, Brega, Bisher, Ogaila, Sultan and Zuwetina...Glory to the martyrs of the revolution...We announce that we join the Libyan Military Council formed in Benghazi." This came after he said "two war planes took off from Al Qurdabiyeh base in Sirte for a raid on the town of Ajdabiya. It was confronted by Anti-aircraft guns and forced it to flee without human casualties. We call on our honorable people in Sirte to intervene and to advice their sons to refuse bombarding any Libyan town to spare the blood of the innocent of our great people."
- Two Libyan Air Force colonels each flew their Mirage F1 fighter jets to Malta after being ordered to carry out air strikes against anti-government protesters in Benghazi. One of the Libyan colonels has reportedly requested asylum.
- On 13 March 2011, Ali Atiyya, a colonel of the Libyan Air Force at the Mitiga military airport, near Tripoli defected and joined the rebellion.
- Colonel Nuretin Hurala, of the Libyan Navy, commanding Benghazi Naval base and his command, defected to the rebellion.

== Business actions ==
The Arabian Gulf Oil Company, the second largest state-owned oil company in Libya, announced plans to use oil funds to support anti-Gaddafi forces. On April 6, 2011, an oil tanker led by Libyan opposition was captured and sent to Qatar. The head of the National Oil Corporation and former prime minister, Shokri Ghanem, defected in Italy.

By 27 February, Libya's biggest oil company, Agaco, turned against the Gaddafi government.

== Other leaders ==
Islamic leaders and clerics in Libya, notably the Network of Free Ulema – Libya urged all Muslims to rebel against Gaddafi.

The Warfalla, Tuareg and Magarha tribes announced their support for the protesters. The Zuwayya tribe, based in eastern Libya, have threatened to cut off oil exports from fields in their part of the country if Libyan security forces continued attacking demonstrators.

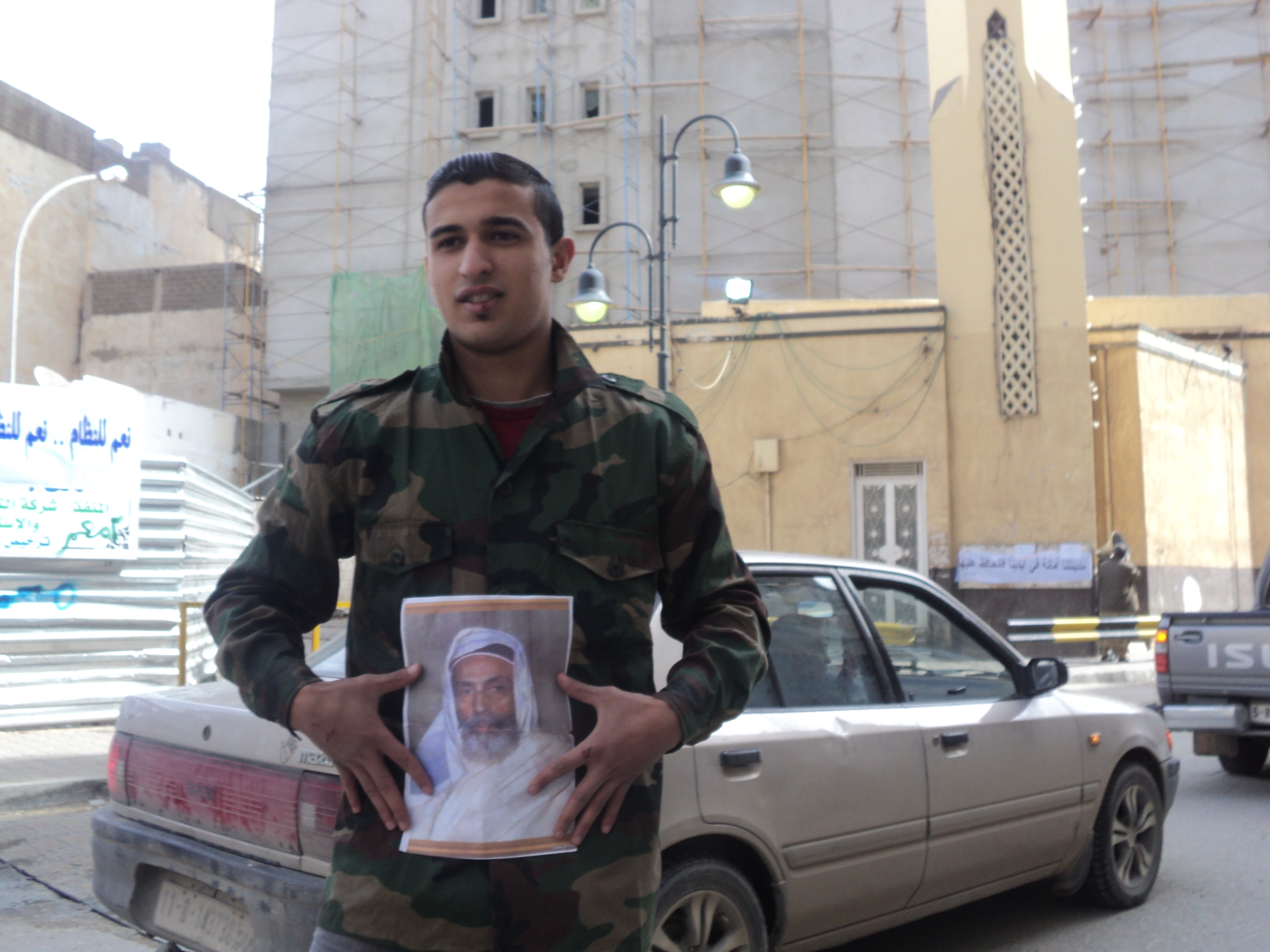
A young Benghazian carrying King Idris' photo. Support of the royal Senussi dynasty has traditionally been strong in Cyrenaica.

== Former royals ==
Libyan-throne claimant, Mohammed El Senussi, sent his condolences "for the heroes who have laid down their lives, killed by the brutal forces of Gaddafi" and called on the international community "to halt all support for the dictator with immediate effect." Senussi said that the protesters would be "victorious in the end" and calls for international support to end the violence.

On 24 February, Senussi gave an interview to Al Jazeera English where he called upon the international community to help remove Gaddafi from power and stop the ongoing "massacre". He has dismissed talk of a civil war saying "The Libyan people and the tribes have proven they are united".

Questioned about what shape a new government could take, and whether the 1951 royal constitution could be revived, Senussi said that such questions are "premature and are issues that are to be decided by the Libyan people," adding that for now the priority is to stop the "killing of innocent people." On whether he desires to return to Libya he says "The Senussi family considers itself as in the service of the Libyan people." When asked about reestablishing the monarchy, he stated that he "is a servant to Libyan people, and they decide what they want".

The White House said it will not specify which individuals and groups it is working and reaching out with, when asked if it supports Senussi's calls for international support.

In an interview with Asharq Al-Awsat, he stated that it is too early to answer if the monarchy in Libya could be restored and if he will be active in Libyan politics. He also says the main objective is to end the violence on the streets in Libya.

On 3 March, it was announced that he planned to return to Libya. On 4 March, he called the West to use airstrikes against Gaddafi after his contacts in Libya told him they need airstrikes. He also argued that a no-fly zone would be insufficient but later calls for the no-fly zone.

He later stated that international community needs "less talk and more action" to stop the violence. He has asked for a no-fly zone over Libya but does not support foreign ground troops. He has also stated that a no-fly zone is the only way to stop Gaddafi who he has said is relying completely on the air force.

In an interview with Adnkronos, a rival claimant to the throne, Idris bin Abdullah al-Senussi, announced he was ready to return to the country once change had been initiated. On 21 February 2011, Idris made an appearance on Piers Morgan Tonight to discuss the uprising.

On 24 February, his brother Hashem called on Gaddafi "to have mercy" on the demonstrators, just as he did with members of the former royal family in 1969 when he allowed them to leave the country unharmed after the coup that overthrew the monarchy.

On 3 March, it was reported that Prince Al Senussi Zouber Al Senussi had fled Libya with his family and was seeking asylum in Totebo, Sweden.

On 17 March, Prince Mohamed Hilal El Senussi returned to Libya after 41 years in exile.

== Public reaction ==
During the Battle of Sirte, residents of Sirte expressed condemnation against the rebels and NATO. According to one resident, "The rebels are worse than rats. NATO is the same as Osama bin Laden." According to another local woman, "We lived in democracy under Muammer Gaddafi, he was not a dictator. I lived in freedom, Libyan women had full human rights. It isn't that we need Muammer Gaddafi again, but we want to live just as we did before." A local elderly woman stated "They are killing our children. Why are they doing this? For what? Life was good before!"
