= 2022 in Libya =

- Decades: 2000s; 2010s; 2020s
- See also: Other events of 2022; List of years in Libya

Events in Libya in 2022.

== Incumbents ==
- President: Mohamed al-Menfi
- Prime Minister:
  - Abdul Hamid al-Dabaib (interim, starting 5 February)

== Events ==
- 17 May - 2022 Tripoli clashes begin
- 2 July - The House of Representatives building in Tobruk is stormed by protesters and burned down.
- Libya participated in the 2022 Mediterranean Games, which were held in Oran, Algeria, and won a bronze medal

== See also ==
- COVID-19 pandemic in Africa
- 2022 in North Africa
- Government of Libya
- Politics of Libya
- Turkish military intervention in the Second Libyan Civil War
- Slavery in Libya
