= 2023 in Libya =

- Decades: 2000s; 2010s; 2020s
- See also: Other events of 2023; List of years in Libya

Events in Libya in 2023.

== Incumbents ==
- President: Mohamed al-Menfi
- Prime Minister: Contested
  - GNU: Abdul Hamid Dbeibeh
  - GNS: Fathi Bashagha (until 16 May); Osama Hammad (since 16 May)

== Events ==
=== February ===
- 15 February – Eleven people are killed and 73 others are missing and presumed dead after a boat carrying migrants sinks off the Libyan coast.
- 19 February – The African Union announces the organization of a peace conference to address the instability in Libya.

=== March ===
- 12 March – Thirty people are reported missing after a boat carrying migrants from Libya capsizes while crossing the Mediterranean Sea.
- 16 March – The Libyan National Army says that it has found about 2.5 tonnes of uranium ore contained in ten drums, near the border with Chad, that was reported missing by the International Atomic Energy Agency.

=== April ===
- 25 April – April 2023 Libya migrant boat disasters

=== July ===
- 11 July – Faraj Bumatari, a former finance minister, is reportedly kidnapped by the militia RADA after arriving at Mitiga International Airport.
- 13 July – Production at El Feel, El Sharara and Plant 108 oilfields is halted in protest against the abduction of Faraj Bumatari.
- 16 July – Two out of three oilfields shut in protest over the arrest of Faraj Bumatari, resume operations after he is released, while Plant 108 remains closed. The oilfields closure costs the country the production of 340,000 barrels.

=== August ===
- 16 August – The death toll from fighting in Tripoli between the 444 brigade and the Special Deterrence Force increases to 55 people, with 146 more injured. The fighting ends after the release of a commander.
- 20 August – Libya’s central bank announces its reunification after being split for nearly a decade due to the country’s long-running civil war that has resulted in two rival administrations, in the east and the west.
- 27 August – Protests are held in western Libya to condemn any normalization with Israel after news spreads that Foreign Minister Najla El Mangoush met with her Israeli counterpart Eli Cohen in Italy. Protesters set fire to the residence of prime minister Abdul Hamid Dbeibeh in Tripoli. Najla later resigned.
- 28 August – Prime Minister Abdul Hamid Dbeibeh dismisses Foreign Minister Najla El Mangoush after she meets her Israeli counterpart in Italy.

=== September ===
- 10-11 September – Storm Daniel strikes eastern Libya, killing 200 people. 2,000 are feared drowned, mostly in Derna. The death toll from the floods caused by Storm Daniel in northeastern Libya increased to 5,200 people, with thousands more missing. The death toll later increases to 11,000 plus.

=== December ===
- 16 December – At least 61 migrants drown when their ship sinks off the coast of Libya after leaving Zuwarah.

== Deaths ==
- Sayyid Gaddaf al-Dam, brigadier general

== See also ==
- COVID-19 pandemic in Africa
- Government of Libya
- Politics of Libya
- Turkish military intervention in the Second Libyan Civil War
- Slavery in Libya
