= Masamir =

Tribe in Libya

The Masamir (Arabic: المسامير Al-Msamir) is an independent Murabtin tribe, one of the major Arab Bedouin tribes of Cyrenaica, Libya. It is one of the largest tribes stationed its personnel deployed in all the cities of Cyrenaica, So find a large basing themselves in the city of Bayda, Marj, Benghazi and Tobruk. The Masamir tribe is important tribe, and although this tribe is known in Libya for its religious inclinations and piety, members of this tribe played a prominent role in fighting against Italian colonialism, particularly during the first half of the twentieth century, Among the most famous sons of the tribe at the time was Yousaf Borahil Al-Msmare known Libyan Muslim resistance leader fighting against Italian colonization and deputy leader of the Libyan Jihad after the death of Omar Al-Mokhtar.

During the Ottoman rule of Cyrenaica, where considered Masamir tribe is the only tribe that does not pay ransom because of their religious affiliation.

Also the Masamir tribe has specialized primarily in domestic intelligence, and the tribe’s members hold a number of key posts within the General Inspections Apparatus.

== Notable Masamir ==
- Yousaf Borahil Al-Msmare – Libyan resistance fighter
- Nuri al-Mismari – Libya's Chief of Protocol under Muammar Gaddafi
- Salih Rajab al-Mismari – Libya's Head of Public Security under Gaddafi
- Ihab Al-Mismari – Libyan diplomat, son of Nuri al-Mismari
- Ahmed al-Mismari – Libyan soldier, spokesman for Khalifa Haftar
