= 2018 in Libya =

- Decades: 1990s; 2000s; 2010s; 2020s
- See also: Other events of 2018; List of years in Libya

Events in the year 2018 in Libya.

== Incumbents ==
- President: Aguila Saleh Issa
- Prime Minister: Abdullah al-Thani

== Events ==
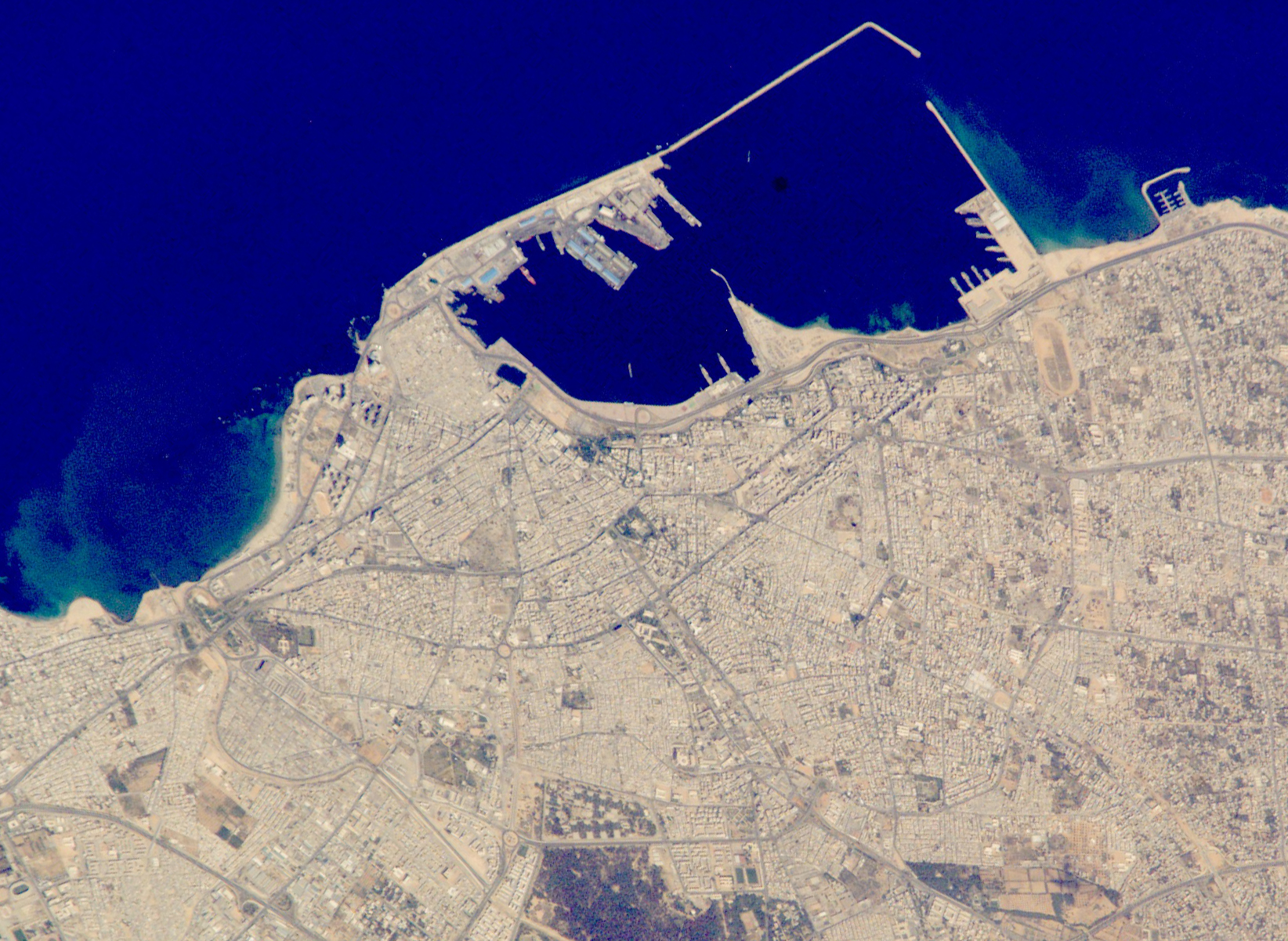
Satellite image of central Tripoli, location for a series of clashes during the Battle of Tripoli

- Libyan Civil War (2014–present)
  - 27 August to 25 September – Battle of Tripoli
  - 19 December – Battle of Saddada Castle
  - 27 December – Battle of Traghan

== Deaths ==
- 9 May – Omar Daoud, footballer (b. 1983).
- 20 May – Ali Hassanein, politician (b. 1925)
