= 2014 in Libya =

- Decades: 1990s; 2000s; 2010s; 2020s
- See also: Other events of 2014; List of years in Libya

The following lists events that happened in 2014 in Libya.

== Incumbents ==
- Prime Minister: Ali Zeidan (until 11 March), Abdullah al-Thani (starting 11 March)

== Events ==
=== January ===
- January 25 - Five Egyptian embassy staff are kidnapped in Tripoli.

=== February ===
- February 5 - At least 12 people are injured in a grenade attack on a school in Benghazi.
- February 21 - 11 people are killed when a Libyan Air Force plane crashes from a suspected engine fire in Nabeul Governorate, Tunisia.
- February 24 - Libyan police found the bodies of seven Egyptian Christians shot dead execution-style on a beach near the city of Benghazi.

=== March ===
- March 11 - The Libyan Parliament sacks Prime Minister Ali Zeidan and appoints former defense secretary Abdullah al-Thani as acting prime minister.
- March 22 - The Libyan National Army fights with rebels occupying oil ports near Benghazi.

=== April ===
- April 14 - Two sons of former Libyan dictator Muammar Gaddafi, Al-Saadi Gaddafi and Saif al-Islam Gaddafi, are scheduled to appear in court along with 35 other former government officials on charges of murder, embezzlement, and kidnapping during the Libyan Civil War.

=== May ===
- May 18 - A group headed by Khalifa Haftar, which includes renegade Libyan general Mokhtar Farnana, launches an attack on the Parliament of Libya.
- May 19 - Saudi Arabia closes its embassy in Tripoli over security concerns in Libya.
- May 21 - Libyan Civil War (2014–present)
  - General Khalifa Haftar calls on the government to hand over power to the country's top judges amid heavy fighting in the capital Tripoli.
  - Prime Minister Ahmed Maiteeq refuses to step down while the Ministry of Defense issues a statement calling for the arrest of any soldiers who join Gen. Haftar’s campaign.

=== June ===
- June 4 - A suicide car bomber detonates his vehicle at the residence of Khalifa Haftar in Benghazi, killing 4 of his guards and injuring another 3.
- June 11 - Forces loyal to General Khalifa Haftar conduct at least three separate airstrikes on Ansar al-Sharia militia bases in Benghazi.
- June 17 - United States special operations forces, in coordination with the FBI, captured Ahmed Abu Khattala, one of the suspected leaders of the Benghazi attack, on the weekend of June 14 to June 15, 2014, in a covert mission in Libya.
- June 28 - Libyan Islamist militia leader Ahmed Abu Khattala pleads not guilty in a Washington D.C. court to one charge of conspiracy in relation to the 2012 Benghazi attack in which four Americans were killed.

=== July ===
- July 13 - Islamist militias attack the Zintan Brigade which controls Tripoli International Airport triggering fierce clashes that result in six deaths.
- July 20 - Islamist militia renew their attack on Tripoli International Airport.
- July 26 - The United States evacuates its embassy in Tripoli amid concerns about deteriorating security conditions.
- July 27 - Post-civil war violence in Libya
  - Intense fighting in Benghazi between the Libyan Army and local Islamist militias leaves 38 dead, mostly soldiers.
  - A rocket attack in Tripoli kills 23 Egyptian workers amid increased fighting in the city for control of an airport.
- July 28 - A huge fire at the National Oil Corp. depot started by a stray rocket threatens Tripoli.
- July 30 - Islamist militias capture a special forces base in Benghazi.

=== August ===
- August 23 - Second Libyan Civil War
  - Warplanes of an unknown nationality bomb Islamist forces, killing ten fighters.
  - Tripoli International Airport is captured by Islamist militias following days of clashes with nationalist militias.
- August 25 - Twice in the last seven days, Egypt and the United Arab Emirates have secretly teamed up to launch airstrikes against Islamist-allied militants battling for control of Tripoli according to senior American officials.

=== September ===
- September 14 - A boat carrying 250 people from Africa to Europe sinks off the coast off Tajoura with most people feared drowned.

=== October ===
- October 6 - ISIS prepares to establish itself in Libya and reports emerge that they are already in the city of Derna.
- October 12 - At least 21 people die in Libyan tribal clashes on the weekend.
- October 20 - Pro-government forces launch an attack on Islamist militants resulting in 75 deaths in five days.

=== November ===
- November 2 - The death toll surpasses 200 from fighting between loyalist troops and Islamist militias in Benghazi since an offensive launched by Khalifa Hifter began two weeks ago.
- November 5 - Battles between loyalist forces and militias have killed nearly 400 in three weeks, including at least 250 deaths in Benghazi and 140 near Tripoli.

=== December ===
- December 5 - Italian rescue crews discover 17 bodies in the hull of a migrant ship off Libya.
- December 25 - A militia attack on a power plant in Sirte leaves at least 19 soldiers dead.
