= 2017 in Libya =

- Decades: 1990s; 2000s; 2010s; 2020s
- See also: Other events of 2017; List of years in Libya

The following lists events that happened during 2017 in Libya.

== Incumbents ==
- Aguila Saleh Issa, President of the Council of Deputies, 5 August 2014-current
- Abdullah al-Thani, Prime Minister, 11 March 2014-current

== Events ==
=== Ongoing ===
- Libyan Civil War (2014–present)

=== August ===
- 14 August: Second kidnapping of Ali Zeidan

=== December ===
- 17 December: assassination of Mohamed Eshtewi

== See also ==
- Timeline of Libyan history
