= 2016 in Libya =

- Decades: 1990s; 2000s; 2010s; 2020s
- See also: Other events of 2016; List of years in Libya

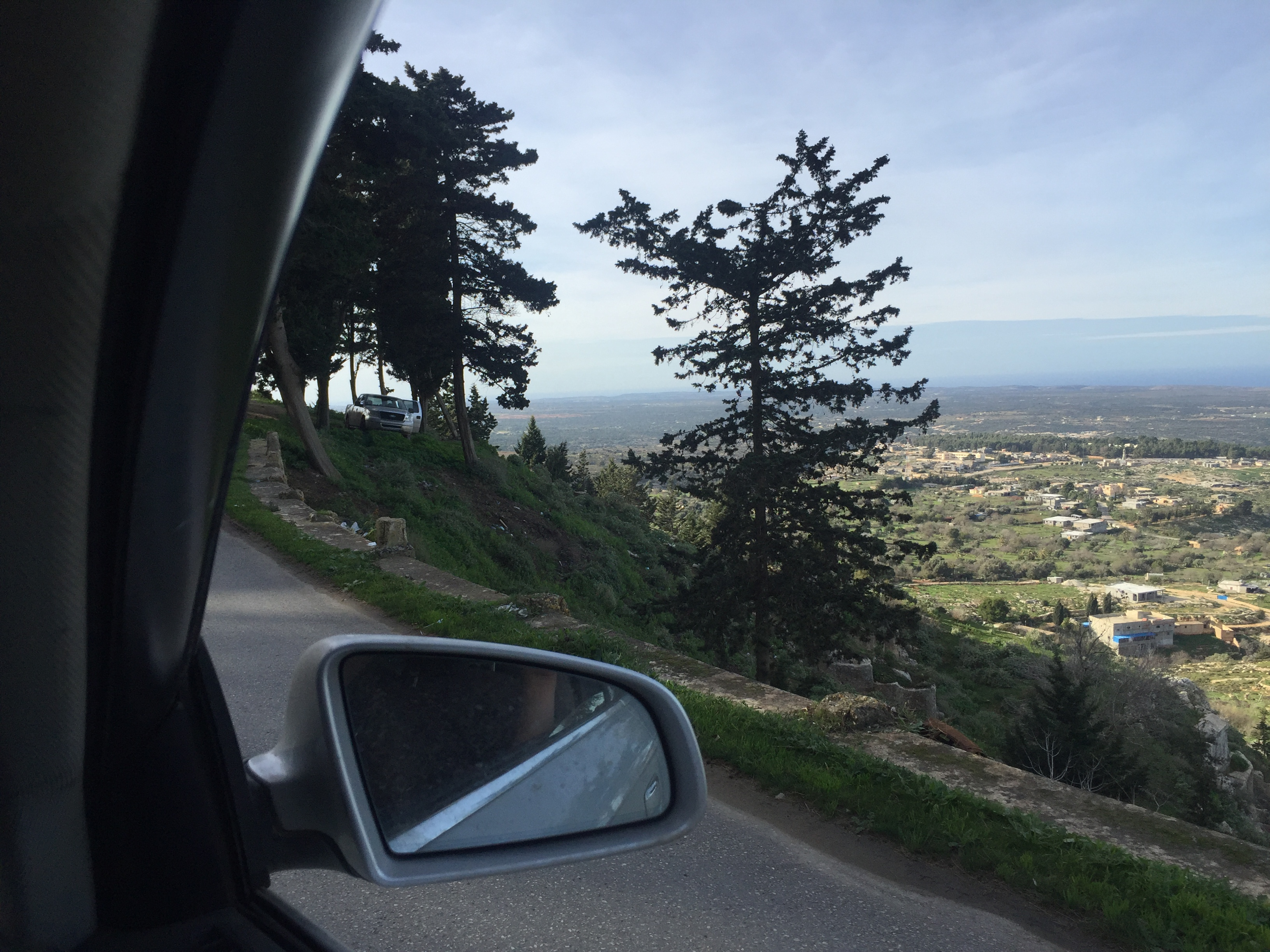
Libya

The following lists events that happened during 2016 in Libya.

== Incumbents ==
- President of the House of Representatives (Tobruk-based government): Aguila Saleh Issa (since 5 August 2014)
- Prime Minister (Tobruk-based government): Abdullah al-Thani (since 11 March 2014)
- Chairman of the Presidential Council and Prime Minister (Government of National Accord): Fayez al-Sarraj (since 12 March 2016)

== Events ==
=== January ===
- 4 January – The Islamic State seized control of Bin Jawad before militants in twelve vehicles attacked the city of Sidra, killing two Petroleum Facilities Guard militants in a suicide bomb attack at a checkpoint.
- 7 January – At least 65 people were killed when a truck bomb hit a police training center in the Libyan town of Zliten.

=== March ===
- 12 March – Fayez al-Sarraj and members of the UN-backed Presidential Council arrived in Tripoli by sea to establish the Government of National Accord, despite opposition from rival factions.

=== May–December: Battle of Sirte ===
- 12 May – Forces loyal to the GNA launched an offensive against the Islamic State in Sirte.
- 1 August – The United States launched airstrikes in support of GNA forces fighting Islamic State in Sirte.
- 6 December – The Libyan Prime Minister announced that Sirte had been liberated from Islamic State after months of fighting.

=== September ===
- 11 September – General Khalifa Haftar’s Libyan National Army seized control of key oil ports in the Oil Crescent, including Ras Lanuf, Es Sider, Zueitina, and Brega.

=== December ===
- 23 December – Afriqiyah Airways Flight 209 was hijacked en route from Sebha to Tripoli and diverted to Malta. The hijackers surrendered after all passengers were released unharmed.

== Deaths ==
- Mohammed Najm, military officer and political figure (date of death unknown)
- Mokhtar Belmokhtar, Algerian jihadist and militant leader, reported killed in U.S. airstrikes in Libya in June (though unconfirmed).
- Abdel Rahman al-Qarawi, senior IS commander in Sirte, killed during fighting.

== See also ==
- 2015 in Libya
- 2017 in Libya
- Timeline of Libyan history
- Libyan Civil War (2014–present)
