= 2015 in Libya =

- Decades: 1990s; 2000s; 2010s; 2020s
- See also: Other events of 2015; List of years in Libya

The following lists events that happened during 2015 in the State of Libya.

== Incumbents ==
- Prime Minister: Abdullah al-Thani

== Events ==
=== January ===
- January 5 - A Libyan warplane bombs a Greek-operated oil tanker anchored offshore the city of Derna, killing two sailors, one Greek and one Romanian. The Greek government condemned what it called an "unprovoked and cowardly" attack and demanded an investigation and punishment for those responsible.
- January 18 - State-sponsored army and Islamist-sponsored opposition declare a ceasefire.
- January 27 - Five gunmen at the Libyan Corinthia Hotel in Tripoli attack with at least ten dead. The hotel was previously the location in 2013 where a former prime minister was abducted.

=== February ===
- February 4 - Gunmen storm the al-Mabrook oil field.
- February 15 - The Islamic State releases a video purportedly showing the beheading of 21 Egyptian Coptic Christians who had been previously kidnapped in Sirte.
- February 16 - Egypt bombs Islamic State in Iraq and the Levant targets in the city of Derna in Libya following the execution of 21 Coptic Christians.
- February 20 - Multiple car bombs kill at least 45 and wound 30 in al-Qubbah.

=== March ===
- March 2 - The House of Representatives agrees to resume UN brokered peace talks with a rival government.
- March 15 - Fighting rages near Sirte between Islamic State and a militia alliance.
- March 16 - Islamic State kidnaps about 20 medical workers from the Ibn Sina Hospital in Sirte.

=== April ===
- April 13 - Nine people are killed and 400+ reported missing when a migrant vessel sinks off the Libyan coast.
- April 16 - Four immigrants arriving in Sicily claim to be the only survivors of a sunken ship. They say that 41 people had drowned when their vessel overturned and sank shortly after departing from Libya.

== Deaths ==
- Khweldi Hameidi, major general
- Mustafa Kharoubi, general and politician
