= 2019 in Libya =

- Decades: 1990s; 2000s; 2010s; 2020s
- See also: Other events of 2019; List of years in Libya

The following events occurred in Libya in the year 2019.

== Incumbents ==
- President: Aguila Saleh Issa
- Prime Minister: Abdullah al-Thani

== Events ==
- April 4 – Second Libyan Civil War: The Libyan National Army (LNA) launches a surprise offensive in western Libya, moving units towards the Government of National Accord-held capital Tripoli and capturing Gharyan.
- July 3 – 2019 Tajoura migrant center airstrike: An airstrike by Field Marshal Khalifa Haftar's Libyan National Army hits the Tajoura Detention Center outside Tripoli, Libya, while hundreds of people are inside the facility, killing at least 53 of them and injuring 130 others.
- December 19 – Libya's Government of National Accord activates a cooperation accord with Turkey, allowing for a potential Turkish military intervention in the Second Libyan Civil War.
- International and UN made efforts to reach a political solution failed due the escalation of fighting in April.
