= 2013 in Libya =

- Decades: 1990s; 2000s; 2010s; 2020s
- See also: Other events of 2013; List of years in Libya

The following lists events that happened during 2013 in Libya.

== Incumbents ==
- Prime Minister: Ali Zeidan

== Events ==
=== January ===
- January 14 - A police officer is wounded after a grenade attack in Benghazi, as Italy announces the temporary withdrawal of the country's consulate in the city after an unsuccessful attack against the consul two days earlier.

=== October ===
- October 10 - 2013 Libyan coup attempt: Prime Minister Ali Zeidan is kidnapped from a hotel in Libya. He would be released hours later.
