= List of ambassadors of Libya to China =

Coordinates: 39.945135°N 116.460134°E

Ambassador of Libya to China
- Incumbent; Hussein Sadiq al Musrati since February 20, 2011
- Inaugural holder: Kamel Maghur
- Formation: 1978

The Libyan ambassador in Beijing was the official representative of the Government in Tripoli to the Government of the People's Republic of China.

== List of representatives ==
- Secretary of the People's Committee of the People's Bureau of the Socialist Peoples Libyan Arab Jamahiriyah in Beijing

Diplomatic agrément/Diplomatic accreditation	ambassador	Observations	List of heads of state of Libya	Premier of the People's Republic of China	Term end
September 1, 1967		Libya has employed since 1962 a steadily increasing number of Taywanese personnel for technical services. As off September 1, 1967 were working there 237 Chinese technicians, including 207 doctors and nurses, 26 engineers, 3 meteorologists, and a harbor consultant.	Idris of Libya	Zhou Enlai	
August 9, 1978		The governments in Beijing and Tripoli recognized each other.	Muammar Gaddafi	Hua Guofeng	
1978	Kamel Maghur		Muammar Gaddafi	Hua Guofeng	
1984	Abdalla Al Alharari	1985: Abdallah Ahmed al Harari, Libya's chief representative in Tunis	Muammar Gaddafi	Zhao Ziyang	
March 9, 1985	Abdul Hamed Zintani		Muammar Gaddafi	Zhao Ziyang	1988
February 25, 1992	Mufath Othman Madi		Muammar Gaddafi	Li Peng	2002
July 27, 2005	Mustafa M. el-Guelushi		Muammar Gaddafi	Wen Jiabao	2008
February 20, 2011	Hussein Sadiq al Musrati		Mustafa Abd al-Dschalil	Wen Jiabao	
