= Prostitution in Libya =

Prostitution in Libya is illegal, but common. Since the country's Cultural Revolution in 1973, laws based on Sharia law's zina are used against prostitutes; the punishment can be 100 lashes. Exploitation of prostitutes, living off the earnings of prostitution or being involved in the running of brothels is outlawed by Article 417 of the Libyan Penal Code. Buying sexual services isn't prohibited by law, but may contravene Sharia law.

Many of the sex workers are from Nigeria (over 1,000 in 2015). There are also sex workers from other sub-Saharan African countries such as Ghana, Liberia and Sierra Leone. Desperate to flee the poverty of their countries, they have often been trafficked to Libya with the promise of a job in Italy. Some are working as prostitutes in Libya to pay off debt bondage in the hope of travelling on to Italy.

== History ==
Historically, prostitution was connected to slavery in Libya. The Islamic Law formally prohibited prostitution. However, since the principle of concubinage in Islam in Islamic Law allowed a man to have sexual intercourse with his female slave, prostitution in the Islamic world was commonly practiced by a pimp selling his female slave on the slave market to a client, who was then allowed to have sex with her as her new owner; the client would then cancel his purchase and return the slave to her pimp on the pretext of discontent, which was a legal and accepted method for prostitution in the Islamic world.

During the Ottoman period, the authorities are known to have tolerated prostitution in the Libyan port cities; prostitutes are noted to have been destitute women, such as widows and women abandoned by their families for indiscretion, or European and Black African slave women.

During the Italian colonial rule, the Italians introduced the same form of regulated prostitution system in Tripolitania and Cirenaica which they used in their other colonies as well as in Italy itself, with licensed brothels staffed with registered prostitutes subjected to regular medical checks. Brothels and prostitution remained legal after the independence of Libya.

After the 1969 Libyan coup d'état, the new leader of the country, Muammar Gaddafi, ordered the closure of Libya's brothels. Four years later, in 1973, prostitution was outlawed.

== Sex trafficking ==
Libya is a destination and transit country for men and women from sub-Saharan Africa and Asia subjected to sex trafficking. Instability and lack of government oversight continued to allow for human trafficking crimes to persist and become highly profitable for traffickers. As reported by international organisations in 2016, trafficking victims—including men, women, and children—are highly vulnerable to extreme violence and other human rights violations in Libya by government officials.

Migrants in Libya are extremely vulnerable to trafficking, including those seeking employment in Libya or transiting Libya en route to Europe. Prostitution rings reportedly subject sub-Saharan women to sex trafficking in brothels, particularly in southern Libya. Nigerian women are at increased risk of being forced into prostitution. Trafficking and smuggling networks that reach into Libya from Niger, Nigeria, Chad, Eritrea, Ethiopia, Somalia, Sudan, and other sub-Saharan states subject migrants to forced prostitution through fraudulent recruitment, confiscation of identity and travel documents, withholding or non-payment of wages, and debt bondage.

Since mid-2015, ISIS in Libya has abducted and taken into captivity at least 540 migrants and refugees, including at least 63 women whom ISIS forced into sexual slavery for its fighters.

The United States Department of State Office to Monitor and Combat Trafficking in Persons ranks Libya as a "Special Case" country.
