= SADAT International Defense Consultancy =

Turkey-based Islamist paramilitary organization

SADAT
- Type: Private military company
- Industry: Private military training services contractor
- Founded: 2012; 14 years ago Istanbul, Turkey
- Founders: Adnan Tanrıverdi
- Headquarters: Marmara Mah. Hurriyet Bulvarı No:110/H; Beylikdüzü, İstanbul; Turkey; 40.974834°N 28.667477°E
- Area served: Worldwide
- Key people: Melih Tanrıverdi
- Products: Law enforcement training
- Services: International defense and interior security consulting
- Website: www.sadat.com.tr

SADAT Inc. International Defense Consultancy (Turkish: Uluslararası Savunma Danışmanlık Şirketi, literally: International Defense Consultant Company) is a private Turkish PMC headquartered in Istanbul, Turkey. It is the country's first domestic military consultancy firm, founded in 2012 by former Turkish Armed Forces (TSK) brigadier general, Adnan Tanrıverdi. The company operates within the Middle East and provides services such as military and interior training, defense consultancy, and ordnance procurement. SADAT's mission and purpose remains shrouded in controversy, facing allegations from anti-Justice and Development Party (AK Party) sources. These allegations range from supporting establishing a private army loyal to President Recep Tayyip Erdogan. It has close communication and cooperation with the Turkish National Intelligence Organization. The CEO is Melih Tanrıverdi, son of the founder (Adnan Tanrıverdi).

Sadat's CEO admits working with Turkish intelligence agency on March 21 2021, and in 2023 he also publicly objected to the NATO membership of Sweden. The company has been dubbed the Wagner group of Turkey.

== Company profile ==
Adnan Tanriverdi, along with 22 other Turkish Armed Forces (TSK) officers and non-commissioned officers (NCOs), created SADAT Inc. on February 28, 2012. The organization maintained a board of directors including Adnan and four other members. His son, Melih Tanriverdi, is the current chairman of the board. The company employees between 50 and 200 former TSK officers from various branches and specializations. Its list of services include:

- Consultancy
- Training
  - Conventional Military Training
  - Unconventional Military Training
  - Special Forces Training
- Ordnance

The company's stated mission is "establishing the connection among the Islamic countries in the sense of defense and military industries, in order to assist the Islamic world to take the rank it deserves among super world powers as a self-sufficient military power, by submitting them the services regarding the organization of armed forces, defense consultancy, military training, and ordnance."

SADAT Inc. has a sister organization, ASSAM, with a more political focus that was also headed by Adnan Tanriverdi until January 2020. It runs a strategic studies center and hosts annual conventions.

== Activities ==
=== Connection to President Erdogan and AK Party ===
Following the attempted coup of July 15, 2016, President Erdogan appointed Adnan Tanrıverdi to his cabinet as chief military counselor. The close relationship between Tanrıverdi and Erdogan, who were relieved from political and military offices in the late 1990s for their Islamic convictions, has sparked allegations of corrupt behavior. These accusations including the belief that SADAT represents and exists as Erdogan's "private militia".

=== Involvement against the 2016 coup d'état attempt ===
According to American Enterprise Institute's (AEI) Michael Rubin, SADAT personnel were active and participated in anti-coup efforts on the night of July 15, 2016. Rubin and others reference social media posts and videos captured by Turkish citizens, which supposedly show SADAT personnel attacking putschists on the Bosphorus Bridge in Istanbul, Turkey.

=== Training Islamist Jihadists ===
Sources state that SADAT is actively training Islamist elements who adhere to an Islamic ideology in Syria and other locations in the Middle East. These locations include Somalia and Qatar, where Turkey has established military training centers and formed cooperative partnerships with the host countries' governments. Additionally, a QatariLeaks video identifies the Sudanese port city of Suakin as another potential site of SADAT involvement.

=== Involvement in Syrian Civil War ===
In 2012 Aydınlık newspaper reported that SADAT established several bases in the Istanbul and Marmara region and trained Syrian fighters. SADAT transported Syrians in these facilities for training and then Turkey used them in Syria.

In 2015, the SADAT founder called in an interview for the establishment of autonomous Turkmen and Sunni Arab areas along the Turkish-Syrian borders.

In 2021, the Turkish mafia boss Sedat Peker accused SADAT of being involved in the arms shipment to the jihadist organization Al-Nusra Front in Syria.

=== Connections with Hamas ===
In 2018, the Israel Security Agency accused SADAT of transferring funds and material to Hamas.

=== Involvement in Libyan Civil War ===
In May 2013, was the first time Libya is mentioned in SADAT's website when it held a visit “to determine the needs of New Libyan Armed Forces and search for possibilities for Consultancy, Training, Ordnance service delivery for Libya.”.

In 2019, Sadat has sold weapons to militias loyal to Tripoli by shipping, between July and September, about 10,000 tons of weapons and ammunition (armored vehicles, missile launchers and drones). Still denounced recently by opposition parties in Turkey, a complaint was filed against Sadat International Defense Consultancy for illegal arms trade. The Turkish president denies any connection with Sadat claiming that he had “nothing to do” with the company’s leadership, despite the appointment of Sadat founder Adnan Tanrıverdi as his advisor following a 2016 coup attempt. A competitor of Sadat in Libya, the Russian private military company Wagner, gained international notoriety in 2014 during the war in Donbas.

In 2020, the United States Department of Defense accused SADAT of training Syrians who were sent to support pro-Turkish forces in Libya.

According to a report by the United States Africa Command, the Syrian mercenaries are paid and supervised by SADAT trainers who also trained other militias in Libya.

In March 2021, the United Nations released a report which mention that SADAT violated the UN resolutions in Libya.

=== Involvement in 2020 Nagorno-Karabakh war ===
SADAT has allegedly been responsible for recruiting, equipping, and transporting Syrian mercenaries to Azerbaijan, in order to fight at the 2020 Nagorno-Karabakh war.

=== Involvement in Sahel ===
According to 2024 reports, it has sent Syrian mercenaries to Niger. SADAT denied the accusations.

=== Involvement in Somali Civil War ===
Somali President Hassan Sheikh Mohamud requested 3,000 mercenaries to counter insurgent advances in Middle Shabelle, a critical region near Mogadishu. The Turkish private military company Sadat, already training Somali forces, should deploy additional personnel to Mogadishu and Middle Shabelle to support government troops and secure a planned Turkish missile testing site on the coast, despite Al-Shabaab offensive. Turkey has sent 500 troops to Mogadishu as the first phase of a 2,500-strong force to bolster Somalia’s defenses, with two military aircraft delivering personnel and equipment, as reported by Caasimada Online.
