= Salih Rajab al-Mismari =

Libyan politician and general

Brigadier General Salih Rajab al-Mismari (Arabic: العميد صالح المسماري) was a Libyan politician and general in the Libyan army who served as Secretary of the General People's Committee of Libya for Public Security during the Gaddafi regime from 2006 to 2011.

In May 2018, Rajab was among the high-profile Gaddafi loyalists who declared their support for Khalifa Haftar at a forum in Benghazi.
