= Hussein Sadiq al Musrati =

Libyan ambassador

Hussein Sadiq al Musrati (Arabic: حسين صادق المصراتي) is a former Libyan Ambassador to China.

On 20 February 2011, during a live interview with Al Jazeera about the 2011 Libyan civil war, al Musrati resigned in support of the protesters. During his resignation, he compared Muammar Gaddafi to Adolf Hitler and stated that all diplomatic staff should resign in protest against Gaddafi.
