= Hanan al-Barassi =

Libyan activist (1963–2020)

- Born: 1963; Libya
- Died: 10 November 2020 (aged 56–57); Benghazi, Libya
- Occupation: Activist

Hanan al-Barassi (Arabic: حنان البرعصي; 1963 – 10 November 2020) was a Libyan activist for human rights and women's rights.

== Biography ==
al-Barassi was born in Libya in 1963. She was born into an influential tribe in the east of the country. She was very active on social media, bypassing strict controls and broadcasting livestreams to defend women's rights and denounce corruption, particularly by Khalifa Haftar and his armed militants. According to Hanan Salah, a reporter for Human Rights Watch, al-Barassi also fought against financial fraud and alleged cases of rape and sexual assault in the city of Benghazi. Her actions were heavily publicized, attracting many enemies to herself.

Hanan al-Barassi was assassinated in Benghazi on 10 November 2020 by a group of men supporting Haftar, although they have not been identified. Shortly before her death, she had been livestreaming on Facebook, where she had been criticizing Khalifa Haftar. Amnesty International reported that she had already been receiving death threats, and an assassination attempt on her daughter in Benghazi had failed the previous year. The Syndicat des avocats libyens stated that security forces instructed assassins to "silence" her.

al-Barassi's death highlighted the danger of denigrating political leaders in Libya, reported Amnesty International. Her death came one year after the disappearance of parliamentarian Seham Sergiwa, who was kidnapped by armed men supporting Haftar in Tripoli and never reappeared. On her tombstone, the inscription "Martyrdom of Truth" appeared in honor of al-Barassi.
