= Suleiman Mahmoud =

General of Libyan army (1949–2020)

- Born: 1949; Tobruk, Emirate of Cyrenaica
- Died: 6 October 2020 (aged 70–71); Tripoli, Libya
- Military career
- Allegiance: Libyan Arab Jamahiriya (until Libyan Civil War) (Libya) National Transitional Council (2011–2020)
- Branch: Army
- Rank: Major General
- Commands: Tobruk Military Region; National Liberation Army
- Conflicts: Libyan Civil War

Suleiman Mahmoud al-Obeidi (Arabic: سليمان محمود العبيدي, romanized: Sulaymān Maḥmūd al-ʻUbaydī; 1949 – 6 October 2020) was a senior military officer of the Gaddafi regime in Libya who defected to the opposition during the Libyan Civil War.

== Career ==
He was formerly a commander in Muammar Gaddafi's army. He was commander of the Tobruk Military Region. He was amongst the first of the army hierarchy to defect to the opposition during the Libyan Civil War. Around half of the estimated 6,000 troops who joined the rebels took their orders from General Mahmoud prior to the 28 July 2011 assassination of General Abdul Fatah Younis, the top commander of the National Liberation Army. The Associated Press reported the next day that Mahmoud succeeded Younis as army commander.

Mahmoud moved his headquarters to Tripoli after the success of Operation Mermaid Dawn. As of early September 2011, he reportedly maintained a separate force from Abdelhakim Belhadj, the head of the Tripoli Military Council, though the two men were ostensibly working to integrate the anti-Gaddafi forces in western Libya into a cohesive military under the aegis of the National Transitional Council.

In 2014, he opposed Khalifa Haftar's Operation Dignity and vocally criticized Haftar while living in Tobruk despite the fact that the Tobruk government was aligned with Haftar. He relocated to Tripoli after Haftar tried to seize Tripoli.

== Death ==
On 6 October 2020, Mahmoud died from COVID-19 at the age of 71 during the COVID-19 pandemic in Libya.
