= Battle of Saddada Castle =

| Date | 19 December 2018 |
| Location | Saddada Castle, Misrata District, Libya. 31°31′17.9″N 14°45′24.7″E |
| Result | Libyan National Army victory |
| Territorial changes | The LNA captures Saddada Castle |

Belligerents
| Libyan National Army | Sirte Protection Force; Benghazi Defense Brigades |

Commanders and leaders
| Khalifa Haftar | Ibrahim Jadhran |

The Battle of Saddada Castle was fought between the Libyan National Army, and the Sirte Protection Force and the Benghazi Defense Brigades on 19 December 2018, which took place in Saddada Castle, between Misrata and Bani Walid. After brief clashes inside the castle, the LNA captured the site. The Sirte Protection Force denied losing the town.

The battle followed a series of LNA advances in Misrata Province earlier that week.
