= Ihab Al-Mismari =

Libyan diplomat

Ihab Al-Mismari (Arabic: إيهاب المسماري) is a former Libyan Counsellor to Canada. He is also the son of former protocol chief Nuri Al-Msmare.

On Wednesday, 23 February 2011, he told the Toronto Star he resigned as counsellor because the embassy's chargé d'affaires was "hiding" the gravity of the deadly crackdown against the protesters back home in Libya. "It is my friends who are dying!", he said.

Al-Mismari's decision was due to his embassy's effort aimed at hiding and downplaying the brutal attacks against protesters in his homeland. He was quoted as saying, "They are killing the friends with whom I grew up; they are killing my brothers and sisters."
