= Turkish intervention in Libya (2020–present) =

Turkish military intervention in Libya

2020 Turkish intervention in Libya
- Part of the Libyan civil war (2014–2020) and the Libyan crisis (2011–present)
- Top: Territorial map of the Libyan Civil War in January 2020 Bottom: Current territorial map of the Libyan Civil War Under the control of the House of Representatives and the Libyan National Army Under the control of the Government of National Accord (GNA) and different militias forming the Libya Shield Force Controlled by local forces
Date	5 January 2020 – ongoing
Location	Libya
Status	Turkey and its proxies pushed LNA out of Tripoli; ceasefire; GNA repelled the LNA offensive and advanced towards Sirte and Western Libya

Belligerents
Turkey (Syrian opposition) Syrian Interim Government; SADAT International Defense Consultancy In support of: (Libya) Government of National Accord (until 2021) (Libya) Government of National Unity (since 2021)	(Libya) House of Representatives (Ba'athist Syria) Syria (until 2024); Wagner Group (Libya) Gaddafi loyalists: Popular Front for the Liberation of Libya

Commanders and leaders
(Turkey) Recep Tayyip Erdoğan (Turkey) Hulusi Akar (Turkey) Hakan Fidan (Libya) Fayez al-Sarraj	(Libya) Khalifa Haftar (Libya) Aguila Saleh Issa

Strength
(Libya) Unknown (Syrian opposition) 18,000 (peak) (Turkey) 50 advisors	(Libya) Unknown; 1,200 Wagner Group (Ba'athist Syria) 4,000 (peak)

Casualties and losses
(Turkey) 2 killed (Syrian opposition) 496 killed 27 captured, 400+ deserted (Syrian opposition) 500 killed (per LNA) (Turkey) 27 killed (per LNA)	(Libya) 100 killed (per Turkey, as of February 2020) (Ba'athist Syria) 8 killed

In January 2020, Turkey militarily intervened in support of the United Nations-recognized Government of National Accord (GNA) of Libya in the 2014–2020 Libyan civil war. Military intervention was approved by the Grand National Assembly of Turkey on 2 January 2020, which passed a one-year mandate to deploy troops to Libya. Turkish military deployments to Libya began on 5 January.

Direct Turkish support for the Government of National Accord usually involves on-the-ground advisers providing training and operational support, air support through unmanned aerial vehicles (UAVs), intelligence operatives and support from Turkish Navy vessels for Libyan ground forces. In addition to its own troop and equipment deployments, Turkey was hiring and transporting Syrian mercenaries from the Turkish-backed Syrian National Army to support and bolster the manpower of the GNA since December 2019.

The Turkish military intervention in Libya is mainly interpreted as an attempt to secure access to resources and maritime boundaries in the Eastern Mediterranean as part of its Blue Homeland Doctrine (Turkish: Mavi Vatan), especially following the ratification of the Libya–Turkey maritime deal. Secondary Turkish objectives are believed to include countering Egyptian and Emirati influence in the Middle East and North Africa. Turkish involvement has also led to disputes with Greece, Israel, and Cyprus.

In December 2023, the Turkish parliament approved the extension of the deployment of the Turkish forces in Libya for two more years starting from 2 January 2024.

On 6 August 2024, Khalifa Haftar's son and LAAF commander Saddam Haftar announced the launch of an operation to "secure the country's southern borders and strengthen stability in these strategic areas". Subsequently, the United Nations called for restraint after Libya's Tripoli-based government placed its forces on high alert in the southern desert region in anticipation of an attack by fighters loyal to the eastern military leader Khalifa Haftar.

== Intervention ==
Following the approval of the one-year mandate to send troops to Libya, President Recep Tayyip Erdoğan stated that Turkish forces had begun to be deployed in the country on 5 January. According to Al-Arabiya, MİT intelligence operatives were the first Turkish assets to arrive in Libya. The LNA claimed to have bombed a Turkish cargo vessel which had been carrying supplies for Turkish-backed forces on 19 February during rocket strikes on the Port of Tripoli, although the Turkish government denied there having been any Turkish cargo ships at the port. On 25 February, President Erdoğan confirmed two Turkish soldiers had been killed in Libya. He also stated that 100 pro-LNA fighters had been killed in retaliation. Published photos, including photos from the Turkish Defense Ministry, revealed that Turkey have transferred to Libya M60 tanks, T-155 Fırtına self-propelled artillery, and T-122 Sakarya multiple rocket launchers.

=== Operation Peace Storm ===
GNA Prime Minister Sarraj announced Operation Peace Storm on 25 March, with Turkish drones and intelligence providing significant backing to the operation. On 1 April, a Turkish Navy frigate fired a surface-to-air missile at a LNA drone which had got close to it, which landed in Ajaylat. With the support of Turkish drones, GNA forces seized recaptured the coastal towns of Sorman, Sabratha, Ajaylat, Aljmail, Regdalin, Zaltan, and Al Assah on 13 April and successfully re-connected GNA-controlled territory with the Tunisian border. Turkish strikes reportedly caused heavy casualties for forces in the area and destroyed military vehicles that had been provided to pro-Haftar forces by the United Arab Emirates.

In May 2020, Turkish drones reportedly destroyed three Pantsir missile systems alongside six others which were destroyed by GNA aircraft and drones.

By 6 June, the GNA had successfully ousted Haftar's forces from the entirety of Tripoli and captured the LNA stronghold of Tarhouna with Turkey's support, considered a significant factor in turning the offensive in the GNA's favour.

However, by the end of June, Egypt (the backer of Haftar) warned Turkey and the GNA of military intervention as the GNA attacked Sirte. The GNA government denounced the warning, and called it a declaration of war.

=== Central Libya clashes ===
On 4 July, unidentified non-Libyan warplanes targeted Al-Watiya Air Base. The airstrikes destroyed GNA military equipment brought by Turkey, including three MIM-23 Hawk air defense systems stationed in the base. The Defense Ministry of Turkey acknowledged that the strikes damaged some of their defense systems. Turkish officials said that no-one was killed in the attack and vowed retribution, indicating the attack could have been perpetrated by Emirati Dassault Mirage 2000 aircraft.

On 21 August, the GNA and the LNA both declared a ceasefire.

== Involvement of SADAT and Turkey's backed foreign mercenaries ==
In May 2013, was the first time Libya is mentioned in SADAT's website. It was on Libya "to determine the needs of New Libyan Armed Forces and search for possibilities for Consultancy, Training, Ordnance service delivery for Libya" and the Turkish government was fully aware of it. After the negotiations a project of "Sports Facilities design for a Military Regiment" was prepared.

The Turkish government first began sending mercenaries hired from the Syrian National Army (SNA) in December 2019, initially sending 300 fighters. As of September 2020, 18,000 Syrian fighters have been sent to Libya, including 350 underage children, and 471 have been killed (34 of whom are alleged to be children). According to some sources, the demographic composition of the fighters are mostly Syrian Turkmen, although the SNA is mostly Arab.

The SOHR claimed that least 50 Syrian fighters were identified as former fighters of the Islamic State of Iraq and the Levant (ISIL), that Turkish intelligence also transferred more than 2,500 Tunisian ISIL foreign fighters to Libya to fight alongside the Turkish-backed militias of the Tripoli-based Government of National Accord (GNA), from nearly 10,000 jihadist fighters The US State Department rejected the allegations, stating: "Despite widespread reports of the fighters' extremist links, the U.S. military found no evidence to suggest the mercenaries were affiliated with the Islamic State extremist group or al-Qaida. It says they were "very likely" motivated by generous financial packages rather than ideology or politics." The US report covered only the first quarter of the 2020 (until the end of March).

On 12 April 2020, the LNA claimed to have captured a Turkish-hired mercenary affiliated with the Peshmerga Roj but the Kurdistan Democratic Party denied the fighter was affiliated with the group.

In July 2020, Al Arabiyah reported that Turkey sent Syrian, Tunisian, Egyptian, and Sudanese mercenaries into Libya with planes.

In 2020, Turkey suspended its support to the Syrian militant group Al-Rahman Legion, because the group refused to obey Turkey's order to send fighters into Libya. Few militants of the group went to fight in Libya, despite the rejection of their commanders.

In 2020, the United States Department of Defense accused SADAT (a private Turkish security contractor company with close relationship with the Turkish state) of training Syrians who were sent to support pro-Turkish forces in Libya. In addition, a US Defense Department report claimed that aside from Turkish troops, Turkey also sent thousands of Syrian mercenaries who were previously used by Turkey in the Syrian civil war.

In March 2021, the UN released a report which proved the use of Syrian mercenaries and multiple violations from Turkey. It also mention that SADAT, violated the UN resolution in Libya.

In May 2021, the Libyan Foreign Minister Najla Mangoush in a press conference alongside the Turkish Foreign Minister, Mevlut Cavusoglu, called Turkey to comply with the UN resolutions and withdraw the Turkish troops and mercenaries. The Turkish Foreign Minister responded that the military forces were present under a training agreement reached with the previous government.

In July 2021, the United States added Turkey to the list of countries that are implicated in the use of child soldiers, because it used them in Syria and Libya.

The 2023 Trafficking in Persons Report mentioned that factions of the Turkish backed Syrian National Army recruited and used Syrian children as child soldiers in Libya.

== Incidents with Operation Irini and arms trafficking ==
In 2018, the UN condemned Turkish shipments of arms to Libya which violated the arms embargo and called them "extremely disconcerting". Turkish Foreign Minister rejected the accusations.

In 2019, shipments of Turkish arms was captured in Libya's port. Furthermore, the cargo ship Amazon Giurgiulesti under the flag of Moldova transferred arms from Turkey to Libya (from the port of Samsun in Turkey to the port of Tripoli in Libya) in violation of UN sanctions. After the incident revealed, the Moldovan authorities suspended the flag registration of the ship. Although Moldovan-flagged, the ship is owned by the Turkish company Maya RoRo SA and operated by the Akdeniz Roro Deniz Tasimaciligi Turizm Sanayi ve Ticaret Limited Sti. In addition, a UN report claimed that Jordan, Turkey and the United Arab Emirates were the main powers who constantly violated the arms embargo.

In 2020, Turkey has prevented warships from Germany, France and Greece which participated in the EU Operation Irini and the NATO Operation Sea Guardian to inspect Turkish vessels which were suspected of carrying illegal arms to Libya. One of the vessels (Çirkin) later found to have violated the UN arms embargo and the maritime company was sanctioned by the EU.

In addition, the captain of the Lebanese-flagged cargo ship Bana was arrested in Italy. The vessel was accused of transferring arms and Turkish military personnel from Turkey to Libya in violation of the United Nations arms embargo, with the escort of the Turkish navy frigates. Moreover, French fighter jets from the French aircraft carrier Charles de Gaulle spotted the delivery at Libya, while on a reconnaissance mission.

In 2020, a joint investigation of The Guardian, Bellingcat, Lighthouse Reports, Stern, ARD and elDiario.es revealed regular flights of cargo planes, transferring arms and personnel, between Turkish and Libyan airports.

In September 2021, a report of the Operation Irini revealed that Turkey refused the inspection of Turkish ships heading to Libya 6 times.

In February 2022, the Turkish intelligence captured and abducted from Ukraine the Turkish arm dealer and former special forces captain in the Turkish armed forces, Nuri Bozkir, after he exposed the Turkish arms transfers to militant groups in Syria and Libya. In an interview before his arrest he said that he bought weapons in eastern European countries and shipped them to Turkey. Then the Turkish intelligence sent them to battlefields across the region.

In May and October 2022, Turkey refused to accept the inspection of the Turkish flagged vessels MSKosovak (May 2022) and MV Matilde A (October 2022) which were heading to Libya.

In March 2023, Turkey denied inspection to Turkish flagged MV KOSOVAK requested by Irini. Security Council called upon all UN members to cooperate with inspections.

== Conviction of journalists ==
In September 2020, five Turkish journalists were jailed in Turkey after revealing documents about the Turkish intelligence activities in Libya. Three of them released in February 2022.

== Reactions ==
=== Libyan ===
- House of Representatives – the Tobruk government, which as of late 2019 controlled the vast majority of Libyan territory as well as most of Libya's oil fields, opposes the maritime deal signed between Turkey and Tripoli which extends Turkish maritime boundaries from the southwest Turkish coast to the coast of Derna and Tobruk. On 22 December, the Tobruk government's Libyan National Army seized a Turkish vessel that entered waters under its control, but released it the next day.
- Government of National Unity – In May 2021, the Libyan Foreign Minister Najla Mangoush in a press conference alongside the Turkish Foreign Minister, called Turkey to comply with the UN resolutions and withdraw the Turkish troops and mercenaries. The Turkish Foreign Minister responded that the military forces were present under a training agreement reached with the previous government.

=== International ===
==== Supranational organizations ====
- United Nations – The United Nations reported that Turkey is one of the countries that systematically violated the Libyan arms embargo. In addition, in March 2021, in a new report UN accused some countries including Turkey of extensive and blatant violations. The report included photos, diagrams and maps in order to support the accusations.
- European Union – the European Union rejected the deployment of Turkish troops in Libya, and jointly with foreign ministers of Italy, France, Germany and the UK, the EU foreign policy chief Josep Borrell called on 7 January for an immediate ceasefire in and around Tripoli. On 21 September 2020, Council of the European Union imposed sanctions on the Turkish maritime company Avrasya Shipping which operates the Çirkin freighter, because the vessel found to have violated the UN arms embargo in Libya in May and June 2020.
- NATO – NATO general secretary Jens Stoltenberg said "that NATO fully supports the work of the United Nations to find a political solution to the crisis and he urged all parties in Libya and members of the international community to support the UN-led process. It was important that all parties respect the UN arms embargo."

==== Governments ====
- Egypt – The Egyptian government, an ally of the Tobruk government, denounced the Turkish-GNA maritime and military deal, foreign minister Sameh Shoukry blasting it as "illegal" in a joint statement on 5 December with French foreign minister Jean-Yves Le Drian. Egypt's parliament approved a bill for the deployment of its army to Libya in the name of national security and fighting terrorists.
- Tunisia – Tunisia rejected the request of Turkey to use its territory for military shipments, but continues to support Government of National Accord (GNA).
- Greece – Greece sent two letters of protest to the United Nations over the Libya–Turkey maritime deal, which Greece viewed as infringing on its own sovereignty and endangering regional stability and expelled the Libyan ambassador from Athens after the deal became known.
- Cyprus – The Cypriot government denounced the Libya–Turkey maritime deal, and tried to rally other countries in the region to oppose its maritime borders aspect.
- Saudi Arabia – Saudi Arabia's foreign ministry condemned "the recent Turkish escalation in Libya". The statement added, "The kingdom affirms that this Turkish escalation poses a threat to the security and stability in Libya and a threat to Arab and regional security, as it is an interference in the internal affairs of an Arab country in flagrant violation of international principles and covenants."
- Israel – Acting foreign minister Israel Katz announced Israel's opposition to the maritime border accord between Ankara and Tripoli, and confirmed that the deal was "illegal" according to the Israeli official position, while at the same time noting that Israel does not want a conflict with Turkey. Earlier in the month, the Turkish navy had driven out an Israeli oceanographic research vessel that had been operating with the consent of the Cypriot government in Cypriot waters. This act, in the context of the deal with the GNA, led to Israeli fears that Turkey aimed to "create a sea border the width of the entire Mediterranean" and cut off Israeli access to international waters via the Mediterranean sea, the channel of 99% of Israeli exports. Energy expert Brenda Schaffer interprets the EastMed pipeline between Israel, Cyprus, and Greece (forecasted to be able to cater to 10% of Europe's gas needs, and decrease reliance on Russia) as a joint attempt to exclude Turkey from the "Club Med" gas club, but the decision to sign the deal was stated to be a response to the Turkish-Libyan deal.
- France – French foreign minister Jean-Yves Le Drian denounced the deal between Ankara and Tripoli in a joint statement with Egypt's foreign minister. President Emmanuel Macron said his country will not permit Turkey's armed interference in Libya and charged Ankara with playing "a dangerous game".
- Iran – Iranian Foreign minister Javad Zarif said that Libya's sovereignty should be respected and added that "the two countries (ie. Turkey and Iran) shared common views on Libya".
- Bahrain – Bahrain's foreign ministry denounced Turkey's decision to send military forces to Libya and opposed any foreign meddling in the domestic affairs of Libya. It added that the decision could hinder efforts to regain peace and security throughout Libya.
- United Arab Emirates – The UAE condemned the decision by Turkey to dispatch its military forces to Libya as a blatant violation of international law. The UAE Ministry of Foreign Affairs and International Cooperation said in a statement such a decision could hinder efforts to achieve stability in Libya and that "Such intervention will constitute a clear threat to Arab national security and will negatively impact stability in the Mediterranean."

== See also ==
- Libyan Civil War (2014–2020)
- 2020 in Libya
- 2020 in Turkey
- 2020 in politics and government
