= Tarhuna =

Tarhuna ترهونة
- Town
- Seal

- Location in Libya
- Coordinates: 32°26′02″N 13°38′04″E
- Country: Libya
- Region: Tripolitania
- District: Murqub
- Elevation: 1,289 ft (393 m)

Population (2011)
  - Total: 13,264
- Time zone: UTC+2 (EET)
- License Plate Code: 27

Tarhuna (/tɑːrˈhuːnə/; Arabic: ترهونة), also Tarhoona or Tarhunah, is a Libyan village 65 kilometres (40 mi) to the southeast of Tripoli, in the Murqub District. The Tarhuna District, including the city of Msallata, had an urban population of about 296,000 (est. 2003). The population in Tarhuna proper was calculated to be 13,264 in 2011.

Its geographical boundaries are from the Valley of the famm Molgha west to Burkaat Oueny eastward, from the Suq al Juma (Al-msab`ha) north, and Al-mzawgha and Marghna south.

== History ==
In the city centre of Tarhuna, just opposite the Tarhuna mosque, there is a memorial to Ali Swidan Alhatmy, who was a hero in the 18 June 1915 Battle of El-Shqiga against the Italians. He was captured in 1922 and hanged by the Italians in the town square.

The population generally belongs to the Tarhuna tribe, which was favoured during the regime of Muammar Gaddafi.

During the late 1950s and into the 1960s, the British Royal Air Force (RAF) established a bombing range on the outskirts of the town. It was manned by RAF personnel from nearby RAF Idris and was used by English Electric Canberra bombers from various bases in Germany. The range consisted of a main control tower with full equipment for communication with the bomber crews, at 45 degrees to the left was a quadrant tower to cross reference the plotting of the bomb hits, to convey the strike position of each bomb, and a target constructed out of 45-gallon oil drums, filled with concrete and built into a pyramid approximately 40-50 feet high and painted white. The range was used to practice the art of a new manouvre known as LABS (low altitude bombing system), where the bomb is launched in a lob towards the target, so that by the time the bomb hits the target, the aircraft has retreated at high altitude and at high speed.

In late August 2011 (as part of the Libyan Civil War), opposition forces from the National Liberation Amy entered Tarhuna, amidst mixed feelings from the citizens.

On 23 August 2012, Interior ministry spokesman Abdelmonem al-Hur stated that more than 100 tanks and 26 rocket launchers were seized from an alleged pro-Gaddafi militia (named Katibat Al-Awfiyah, or Brigade of the Faithful), during a raid on their campsite in Tarhuna. The operation ended with one of the suspects killed, eight wounded and thirteen detainees, accused of being linked with the 19 August Tripoli bombings.

According to reports in The Washington Post, Tarhuna was dominated between 2011 and 2020 by the Kani brothers and their militia, the Kaniyat. Imposing a reign of terror, the Kaniyat were allegedly responsible for hundreds of killings in the town, with the collusion of the Government of National Accord. In 2019, the Kaniyat switched allegiance to the warlord Khalifa Haftar-led LNA forces during the Second Libyan Civil War, and became the LNA's stronghold in western Libya. On 18 April 2020, the forces of the UN-recognized GNA government, with the backing of Turkish drones, launched a major offensive with the aim to reclaim Tarhuna from Haftar. On 5 June, it was captured by the GNA. Explosive devices, landmines, and mass graves of civilians, many buried alive, were discovered in the city.

== Economy ==
Tarhuna is a leading producer of olive oil, cereals, figs, grapes, sparto grass, and various nuts.

== Education ==
The Faculty of Law of Al Nasser University is located north of the town.

== Notable people ==
- Giovanni Innocenzo Martinelli (1942–2019), Libyan-Italian Roman Catholic prelate

== Sport ==
Many sports clubs have been founded in Tarhunah. Al-Noor School club was founded in 1960 and is currently playing in the third division Al-Shabeba Club Club Soqor Al-Sag`ya.

== See also ==
- List of cities in Libya
- Tarhuna District
- Tarhuna Wa Msalata District
