= Nuri al-Mismari =

Former Chief of Protocol of Libya (born 1942)

- نوري المسماري
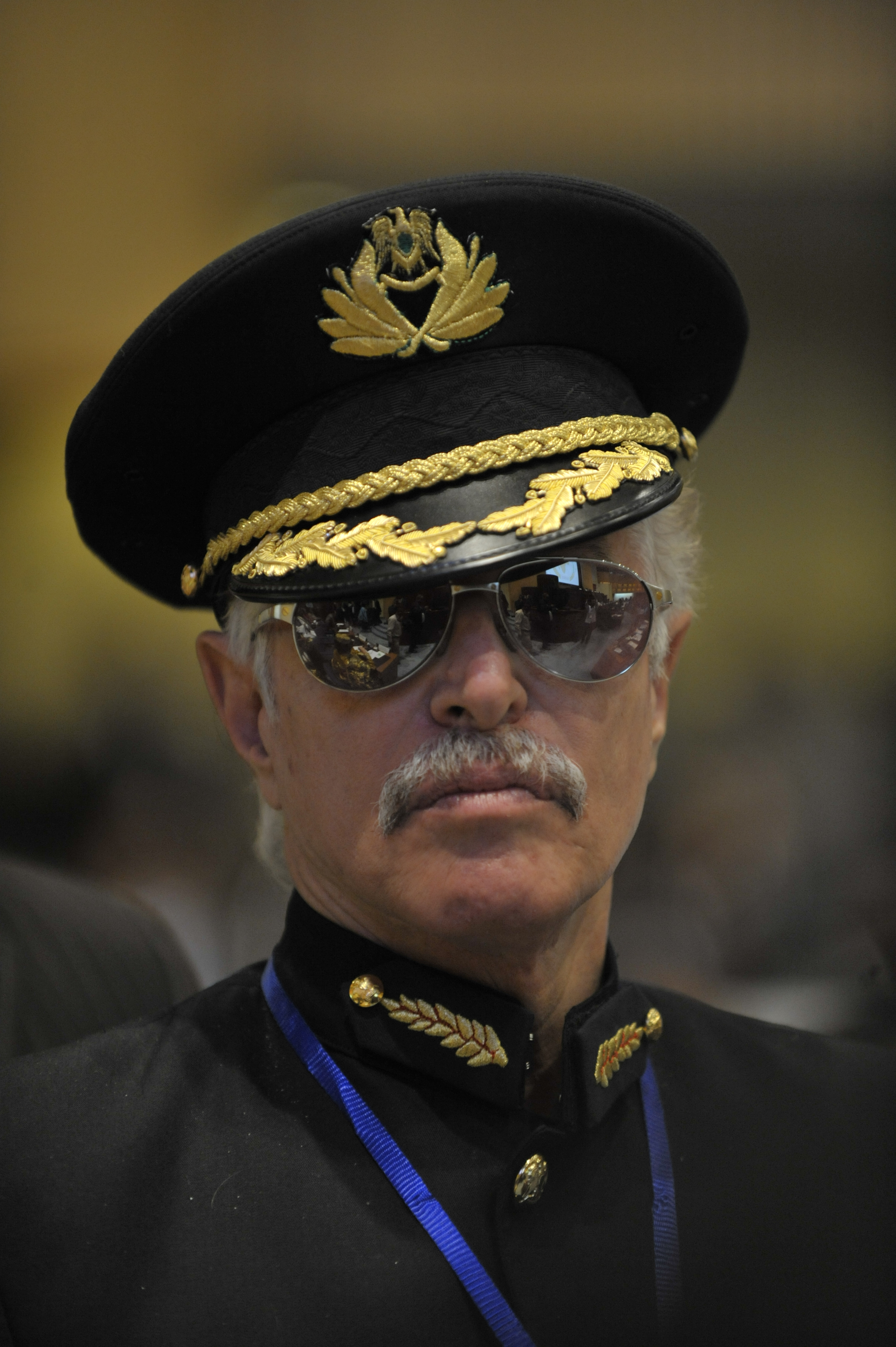
- al-Mismari in the Plenary Hall of the United Nations building in Addis Ababa, Ethiopia during the African Union Summit on 2 February 2009
- Occupations: politician, diplomat
- Relatives: Ihab Al-Mismari (son)

Nuri al-Mismari (Arabic: نوري المسماري) is the former chief of protocol of former Libyan leader Muammar Gaddafi. Known as one of Gaddafi's closest aides, al-Mismari was a key member of his inner circle and served under him for 40 years, until his defection to France in 2010.

The Libyan government issued an international arrest warrant against him on charges of embezzlement. He was arrested in Paris but was then released from French custody. His extradition hearing was subsequently postponed and he was ultimately never extradited due to the Libyan civil war breaking out in 2011.

== Biography ==
=== Background and career ===
Nuri al-Mismari's father was a minister in the Kingdom of Libya under Idris of Libya. One of his sons was shot under mysterious circumstances in 2007 and the death was disguised as a suicide by authorities. He is fluent in many languages including English and French. In 2008, al-Mismari played a minor role in reuniting a British woman with her daughter after her ex-husband abducted their daughter and took her to Libya.

He was seen as the "gatekeeper" to Gaddafi and one of a small group of officials with access to Gaddafi's tent. Distinguished by his dyed blonde hair and goatee and ceremonial uniform, he was often seen standing next to Gaddafi at public events and shepherding visitors to Gaddafi. A hotelier by trade, he was in charge of coordinating visits by foreign heads of state to Libya (including lodging at palaces), overseeing Libya's payments to Gaddafi's children, and managing Gaddafi's fleet of airplanes.

=== Defection to France ===
On 21 October 2010, al-Mismari fled to France after stopping by Tunisia. He was last seen with Gaddafi at the Arab-African summit in Sirte on 9 and 10 October 2010. It was alleged Gaddafi had insulted al-Mismari at the summit. His defection was not publicized until 28 November 2010, when Libya issued an international arrest warrant against him. He was arrested in Paris at the request of Libya, which alleged he was involved in embezzlement. His supporters in Libya, including sources close to Gaddafi's reformist son Saif al-Islam, countered that al-Mismari only went to France to undergo heart surgery and was set up amid a power struggle within Gaddafi's inner circle. According to Francois Bechis of the Italian newspaper Libero, al-Mismari gave extensive information while under French custody, claimed that he had connections within Tunisian dissidents, pinpointed the weaknesses of the Gaddafi regime, and was formally seeking asylum in France. Foreign Minister Moussa Koussa was held responsible for Mismari's defection and, anticipating more potential defections, Gaddafi confiscated the passports of several senior officials, including Koussa.

On 15 December 2010, al-Mismari was released from French custody and his extradition hearing was subsequently postponed as the French judge requested more information from Libya. On 16 December 2010, Gaddafi sent Abdallah Mansour, the head of Libyan state media, to lure al-Mismari back to Libya. Instead, Mansour was arrested at the Hotel Concorde Lafayette. On 23 December 2010, a delegation of anti-Gaddafi Libyans (Farj Charrani, Fathi Boukhris, and Ali Younes Mansouri) arrived in Paris to dine with al-Mismari, yet sources close to al-Mismari claimed he had resumed his "normal functions" as head of protocol and was preparing to return to Libya.

Due to the Libyan civil war breaking out in February 2011, al-Mismari was never extradited to Libya. In February 2011, one of Gaddafi's sons, Mutassim, allegedly came to Paris to ask him to return to Libya to no avail and al-Mismari subsequently tendered his resignation as chief of protocol from exile. As of 2013, he was still living in Paris.

=== Libyan Civil War ===
In February 2011, his son, Ihab El-Mismari, a high-ranking diplomat representing the Libyan embassy in Canada, resigned in protest over Gaddafi's crackdown of protestors in the early phase of the Libyan civil war. Ihab was not among the five Libyan diplomats expelled from Canada in May 2011.

In March 2011, al-Mismari predicted that Gaddafi would fight to the end in the Libyan civil war rather than step down, commit suicide, or go into exile. He also alleged that Silvio Berlusconi, Prime Minister of Italy, had sent escorts to an unidentified African leader to help Gaddafi get elected as Chairperson of the African Union in 2009.

=== Posthumous allegations against Gaddafi ===
al-Mismari claimed that on two occasions, Gaddafi raped foreign visitors to Libya. The alleged victims were a Nigerian woman and the wife of a Swiss businessman. He also alleged that Gaddafi harassed the ex-wife of French President Nicolas Sarkozy, Cecilia.

In a 2013 interview with French journalist Annick Cojean, Gaddafi's Chief of Security Mansour Dhao accused al-Mismari and Mabrouka Sherif of being the primary facilitators of Gaddafi's alleged "sexual abuse". Dhao also accused al-Mismari of procuring prostitutes for Gaddafi and practicing black magic. al-Mismari was named in Cojean's book Gaddafi's Harem: The Story of a Young Woman and the Abuses of Power in Libya.

In 2014, al-Mismari was interviewed by BBC for the documentary “Mad Dog – Qaddafi’s Secret World," where he alleged that Gaddafi was "terribly sexually deviant", kept underaged male and female sex slaves, and kept the body of Mansour Rashid El-Kikhia, former Libyan Minister of Foreign Affairs, in a freezer.
