= COVID-19 pandemic in Libya =

- Disease: COVID-19
- Pathogen: SARS-CoV-2
- Location: Libya
- First outbreak: Wuhan, China
- Index case: Tripoli, Libya
- Arrival date: 24 March 2020 (6 years, 7 months and 4 days)
- Confirmed cases: 507,269 (updated 18 September 2026)
- Deaths: 6,437 (updated 18 September 2026)

Government website
- covid19.ly National Centre for Disease Control - Libya Dashboard

The COVID-19 pandemic was confirmed to have spread to Libya on 24 March 2020, when the first case was officially confirmed in Tripoli.

Libya is considered especially vulnerable to the pandemic due to the effects from the Second Libyan Civil War, which has led to a dire humanitarian situation and the destruction of the nation's health infrastructure.

== Background ==
On 12 January 2020, the World Health Organization (WHO) confirmed that a novel coronavirus was the cause of a respiratory illness in a cluster of people in Wuhan, Hubei, China, which was reported to the WHO on 31 December 2019.

The case fatality ratio for COVID-19 has been much lower than SARS of 2003, but the transmission has been significantly greater, with a significant total death toll.

== Timeline ==
=== 2020 ===
==== March ====
- Prior to the coronavirus pandemic, Libya's healthcare system was already on the verge of collapse, given the chaos that has prevailed in the country since 2011. Warring factions in the Libyan Civil War disregarded repeated entreaties from the United Nations for a ceasefire during the pandemic.
- The internationally recognized Government of National Accord (GNA), based in Tripoli, and the rival government under Khalifa Haftar, based in eastern Libya, both took steps to control the spread of COVID-19, through the closure of schools, markets, and some businesses. Haftar's forces have attempted to take Tripoli, the Libyan capital, in an offensive that began in April 2019. Hundreds have been killed, and thousands have been displaced, in the fighting.
- On 24 March, Libya confirmed its first COVID-19 case, a 73-year-old man who had returned to the country on 5 March from a trip to Saudi Arabia.
- On 30 March, the GNA announced the release of 466 detainees in Tripoli, as part of an effort to stop the spread of the virus in prisons.
- By the end of March ten persons had tested positive for COVID-19. One patient had recovered and nine remained active cases at the end of the month.

==== April to June ====
- On 5 April, Mahmoud Jibril, age 68, who headed the interim National Transitional Council in 2011, died from COVID-19 in Cairo, Egypt, after having been admitted to the hospital on March 21.
- On 6 April, forces under the command of Khalifa Haftar launched a Grad rocket attack against Al Khadra General Hospital, one of Tripoli's largest hospitals, injured six health workers and substantially damaged the hospital, where 300 patients, including two COVID-19 patients, were being treated. This was the third time that Haftar's forces attacked medical facilities during their intensified siege of Tripoli. The United Nations Office for the Coordination of Humanitarian Affairs condemned the attack as an "appalling" and "clear violation of international humanitarian law ... It is unacceptable at a time when healthcare and health workers are vital in our fight against a global pandemic." The office stated that "This senseless escalation must stop so that health authorities and aid agencies can respond to COVID-19 and continue reaching people in need of urgent humanitarian assistance." Renewed rocket attacks against the hospital continued the following day.
- On 7 April, Eastern Libya confirmed its first case. By 7 April, Libya had confirmed 20 cases of COVID-19, mostly in western Libya.
- On 15 April, the Government of National Accord imposed a 24-hour curfew for a period of 10 days beginning on 17 April.
- During April there were 51 new cases, bringing the total number of confirmed cases to 61. The number of recovered patients increased to 18, while three patients died. There were 40 active cases at the end of the month.
- In May, there were 95 new cases, bringing the total number of confirmed cases to 156. The death toll rose to 5. The number of recovered patients increased by 34 to 52, leaving 99 active cases at the end of the month.
- Cases doubled over a period of two weeks in June, while increased conflict, including targeting of health facilities, has left it difficult for medical teams to respond.
- On 26 June, the UN-backed government extended the 8pm to 6am curfew for two further weeks, as confirmed cases increased to 713.
- There were 668 new cases in June, raising the total number of confirmed cases to 824. The death toll rose by 19 to 24. The number of recovered patients grew by 157 to 209, leaving 591 active cases at the end of the month. Model-based simulations indicate that the 95% confidence interval for the time-varying reproduction number R_{t} fluctuated around 1.2 in June and July.

==== July to September ====
- There were 2,797 new cases in July, bringing the total number of confirmed cases to 3621. The death toll rose by 50 to 74. The number of recovered patients increased by 409 to 618, leaving 2929 active cases at the end of the month.
- There were 10,035 new cases in August, raising the total number of confirmed cases to 13,656. The death toll rose to 232. At the end of the month there were 12,270 active cases.
- There were 20,358 new cases in September, raising the total number of confirmed cases to 34,014. The death toll rose to 540.

==== October to December ====
- On 6 October, Suleiman Mahmoud, age 71, who was the Chief of Staff of the National Liberation Army in 2011, died from COVID-19 in Tripoli.
- There were 27,081 new cases in October, bringing the total number of confirmed cases to 61,095. The death toll rose to 857. There were 25,208 active cases at the end of the month.
- There were 21,714 new cases in November, bringing the total number of confirmed cases to 82,809. The death toll rose to 1,183. There were 27,808 active cases at the end of the month.
- There were 17,468 new cases in December, taking the total number of confirmed cases to 100,277. The death toll rose to 1,478. There were 26,692 active cases at the end of the month.

=== 2021 ===
==== January to March ====
- On 12 February, Tohami Khaled, who headed the Internal Security Agency under the Gaddafi regime, died from COVID-19 in Cairo, Egypt.
- There were 19,125 new cases in January, taking the total number of confirmed cases to 119,402. The death toll rose to 1,883. There were 18,048 active cases at the end of the month.
- There were 14,725 new cases in February, taking the total number of confirmed cases to 134,127. The death toll rose to 2,210. There were 10,801 active cases at the end of the month.
- There were 25,853 new cases in March, taking the total number of confirmed cases to 159,980. The death toll rose to 2,680. There were 9,436 active cases at the end of the month.

==== April to June ====
- On April 11, Libya launched a vaccination program following the arrival of 157,600 vaccine doses of the Sputnik V Light and Oxford-AstraZeneca vaccines. As of 29 April, 61000 doses had been administered.
- There were 17,528 new cases in April, taking the total number of confirmed cases to 177,508. The death toll rose to 3,029. There were 11,288 active cases at the end of the month.
- There were 8,564 new cases in May, taking the total number of confirmed cases to 186,072. The death toll rose to 3,127. There were 10,828 active cases at the end of the month. Since the start of vaccinations, 240,091 persons had received their first inoculation.
- There were 7,833 new cases in June, taking the total number of confirmed cases to 193,905. The death toll rose to 3,198. There were 12,086 active cases at the end of the month. Since the start of vaccinations, 379,404 persons had received their first inoculation.

==== July to September ====
- There were 59,531 new cases in July, taking the total number of confirmed cases to 253,436. The death toll rose to 3,548. There were 57,704 active cases at the end of the month. Since the start of vaccinations, 546,745 persons had received their first inoculation.
- There were 55,536 new cases in August, bringing the total number of confirmed cases to 308,972. The death toll rose to 4,247. There were 84,257 active cases at the end of the month. Since the start of vaccinations, 950,010 persons had received their first inoculation and 80,050 had received both inoculations.
- There were 31,112 new cases in September, bringing the total number of confirmed cases to 340,084. The death toll rose to 4,651. The number of recovered patients increased to 259,574, leaving 75,859 active cases at the end of the month.

==== October to December ====
- There were 17,880 new cases in October, bringing the total number of confirmed cases to 357,964. The death toll rose to 5,122.
- There were 15,246 new cases in November, bringing the total number of confirmed cases to 373,210. The death toll rose to 5,466. There were 19,514 active cases at the end of the month. Since the start of vaccinations, 1,710,742 persons had received their first inoculation and 666,531 had received two doses.
- There were 15,524 new cases in December, bringing the total number of confirmed cases to 388,734. The death toll rose to 5,710. There were 6,746 active cases at the end of the month. Since the start of vaccinations, 1,872,292 persons had received their first inoculation and 851,595 had received two doses.

=== 2022 ===
==== January to March ====
- There were 40,932 new cases in January, raising the total number of confirmed cases to 429,666. The death toll rose to 6,017. There were 31,192 active cases at the end of the month.
- There were 64,780 new cases in February, raising the total number of confirmed cases to 494,446. The death toll rose to 6,261. There were 22,718 active cases at the end of the month.
- There were 7,259 new cases in March, bringing the total number of confirmed cases to 501,705. The death toll rose to 6,415. There were 5,337 active cases at the end of the month.

==== April to June ====
- There were 211 new cases in April, raising the total number of confirmed cases to 501,916. The death toll rose to 6,430. There were 4,501 active cases at the end of the month.
- There were 100 new cases in May, raising the total number of confirmed cases to 502,016. The death toll remained unchanged. There were 4,613 active cases at the end of the month.
- There were 122 new cases in June, raising the total number of confirmed cases to 502,138. The death toll remained unchanged. There were 4,735 active cases at the end of the month.

==== July to September ====
- There were 2,859 new cases in July, raising the total number of confirmed cases to 504,997. The death toll rose to 6,431. There were 6,207 active cases at the end of the month.
- There were 1,863 new cases in August, raising the total number of confirmed cases to 506,860. The death toll rose to 6,437. There were 234 active cases at the end of the month.
- There were 145 new cases in September, raising the total number of confirmed cases to 507,005. The death toll remained unchanged. There were 47 active cases at the end of the month.

==== October to December ====
- There were 46 new cases in October, raising the total number of confirmed cases to 507,051. The death toll remained unchanged. There were 43 active cases at the end of the month.
- There were 33 new cases in November, raising the total number of confirmed cases to 507,084. The death toll remained unchanged.
- There were 69 new cases in December, raising the total number of confirmed cases to 507,153. The death toll remained unchanged. There were 41 active cases at the end of the month.

=== 2023 ===
- There were 116 new cases in 2023, raising the total number of confirmed cases to 507,269. The death toll remained unchanged.

== Statistics ==
=== Confirmed new cases per day ===
View source data.

=== Confirmed deaths per day ===
View source data.

== See also ==
- COVID-19 pandemic in Africa
- COVID-19 pandemic by country and territory
- Libyan Crisis (2011–present)
