= Slavery in Libya =

19th-century caravan routes in Libya

Slavery in Libya has a long history and a lasting impact on the Libyan culture. It is closely connected with the wider context of slavery in North Africa and trans-Saharan slave trade.

Since ancient history, the territory of modern Libya was a transit area for the slave trade from Sub-Saharan Africa across the Sahara desert to the Mediterranean Sea. The Trans-Saharan slave trade was known from antiquity and continued until the 20th century. Slavery in Ottoman Libya was nominally prohibited in the 19th century, but the abolition laws were not enforced.

During the Italian colonial period (1912–1951) the slavery and slave trade was finally suppressed in practice. Abolition was, however, a gradual and slow process, and the institution of slavery continued long into the colonial period, particularly in the interior desert areas, where the Italian control was weak. The Trans-Saharan slave trade in the interior of Libya was still in operation as late as the 1930s.

Following the 2011 Libyan civil war that resulted in the overthrow of Muammar Gaddafi, the country saw an increase in the slave trade of Africans taken from across the Sahara, with open-air slave markets reported in a number of cities in Libya, including the capital city, Tripoli. Slavery remains an issue in Libya as of 2025.

== History ==
=== Roman Libya ===
As a Roman province, Tripolitania was a major exporter of agricultural products, as well as a centre for the gold and slaves conveyed to the coast by the Garamantes, while Cyrenaica remained an important source of wines, drugs, and horses.

=== Enslavement of the Berbers and the Jews ===
When Amr ibn al-As conquered Tripoli in 643, he forced the Jewish and Christian Berbers to give their wives and children as slaves to the Arab army as part of their jizya. Uqba ibn Nafi would often enslave for himself (and to sell to others) countless Berber girls, "the likes of which no one in the world had ever seen."

Ibn Abd al-Hakam recounts that the Arab General Hassan ibn al-Nu'man would often abduct "young, female Berber slaves of unparalleled beauty, some of which were worth a thousand dinars." Al-Hakam confirms that up to one hundred thousand slaves were captured by Musa and his son and nephew during the conquest of North Africa. In Tangier, Musa enslaved all the Berber inhabitants. Musa sacked a fortress near Kairouan and took with him all the children as slaves. The number of Berbers enslaved "amounted to a number never before heard of in any of the countries subject to the rule of Islam" up to that time. As a result, "most of the African cities were depopulated, [and] the fields remained without cultivation." Even so, Musa "never ceased pushing his conquests until he arrived before Tangiers, the citadel of their [Berbers’] country and the mother of their cities, which he also besieged and took, obliging its inhabitants to embrace Islam."

The historian Pascual de Gayangos observed: “Owing to the system of warfare adopted by the Arabs, it is not improbable that the number of captives here specified fell into Musa’s hands. It appears both from Christian and Arabian authorities that populous towns were not infrequently razed to the ground and their inhabitants, amounting to several thousands, led into captivity.”

Successive Muslim rulers of North Africa continued to enslave the Berbers en masse. The historian Hugh N. Kennedy observed that "the Islamic jihad looks uncomfortably like a giant slave trade." Arab chronicles record vast numbers of Berber slaves taken, especially in the accounts of Musa ibn Nusayr, who became the governor of Africa in 698, and who "was cruel and ruthless against any tribe that opposed the tenets of the Muslim faith, but generous and lenient to those who converted." Muslim historian Ibn Qutaybah recounts Musa ibn Nusayr waging "battles of extermination" against the Berbers and how he "killed myriads of them, and made a surprising number of prisoners."

According to the historian As-sadfi, the number of slaves taken by Musa ibn Nusayr was greater than in any of the previous Islamic conquests.

Musa went out against the Berbers, and pursued them far into their native deserts, leaving wherever he went traces of his passage, killing numbers of them, taking thousands of prisoners, and carrying on the work of havoc and destruction. When the nations inhabiting the dreary plains of Africa saw what had befallen the Berbers of the coast and of the interior, they hastened to ask for peace and place themselves under the obedience of Musa, whom they solicited to enlist them in the ranks of his army

=== Enslavement of Europeans ===
There is historical evidence of North African Muslim slave raids all along the Mediterranean coasts across Christian Europe. The majority of slaves traded across the Mediterranean region were predominantly of European origin from the 7th to 15th centuries. In the 15th century, Ethiopians sold slaves from western borderland areas (usually just outside the realm of the Emperor of Ethiopia) or Ennarea. European slaves where also traded South: in the 17th-century, European slaves are noted to have been imported to the Sub-Saharan African Bornu Empire from Tripoli in Libya.

Around 170 Christians enslaved in Tripoli – mainly Sicilians or Maltese – were liberated when the city was captured by the Spanish in 1510. Following the Ottoman attack of Gozo in July 1551, some 5,000 to 7,000 people were enslaved and were initially taken to North Africa. Although most were later taken to Constantinople, some of the enslaved Gozitans remained in territory which now forms part of Libya. There are records of some being sold in Tajura, and according to tradition, some enslaved Gozitans were taken to Tarhuna where they and their descendants converted to Islam and assimilated into the local population. Some reportedly maintained memory of their Maltese ancestry until as late as World War II.

It is estimated that between 1 million and 1.25 million Europeans were captured by pirates and sold as slaves between the 16th and 19th century. Reports of Barbary raids and kidnappings of those in Italy, France, Iberia, England, Ireland, Scotland and as far north as Iceland exist from this period. Famous accounts of Barbary slave raids include a mention in the Diary of Samuel Pepys and a raid on the coastal village of Baltimore, Ireland, during which pirates left with the entire populace of the settlement. Such raids in the Mediterranean were so frequent and devastating that the coastline between Venice and Malaga suffered widespread depopulation, and settlement there was discouraged. It was said that this was largely because "there was no one left to capture any longer".

=== Enslavement of West & Central Africans ===
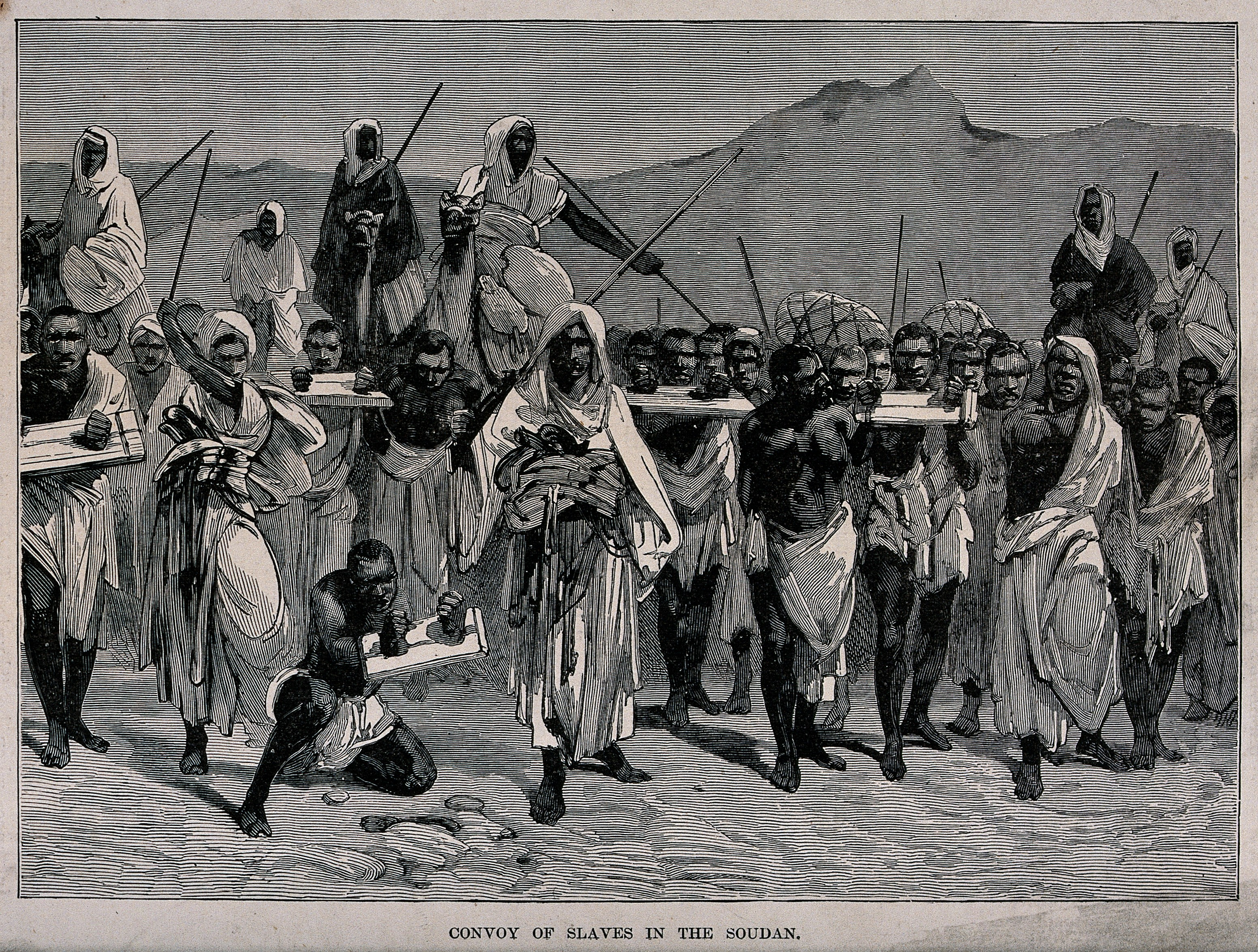
A depiction of slaves being transported across the Sahara desert.

When Tripoli was under Hospitaller rule between 1530 and 1551, black slaves were exported from Tripoli to Hospitaller Malta and the Kingdom of Sicily. The Hospitallers imposed a tax of two ducats per slave sold in Tripoli.

The Tuareg and others who are indigenous to Libya facilitated, taxed and partly organized the trade from the south along the trans-Saharan trade routes. In the 1830s – a period when slave trade flourished – Ghadames was handling 2,500 slaves a year.

The regency of Tripoli was subjected to Western pressure to end the flourishing Trans-Saharan slave trade by the 1840s, but the ruler, though he explained himself willing in 1842, could not persuade the chiefs of the interior, who were major players in the Trans-Saharan slave trade between Bornu and Sokoto to the Libyan coast.

Even though the slave trade was officially abolished in Tripoli by the Firman of 1857, this law was never enforced, and continued in practice at least until the 1890s.

The British Consul in Benghazi wrote in 1875 that the slave trade had reached an enormous scale and that the slaves who were sold in Alexandria and Constantinople had quadrupled in price. This trade, he wrote, was encouraged by the local government.

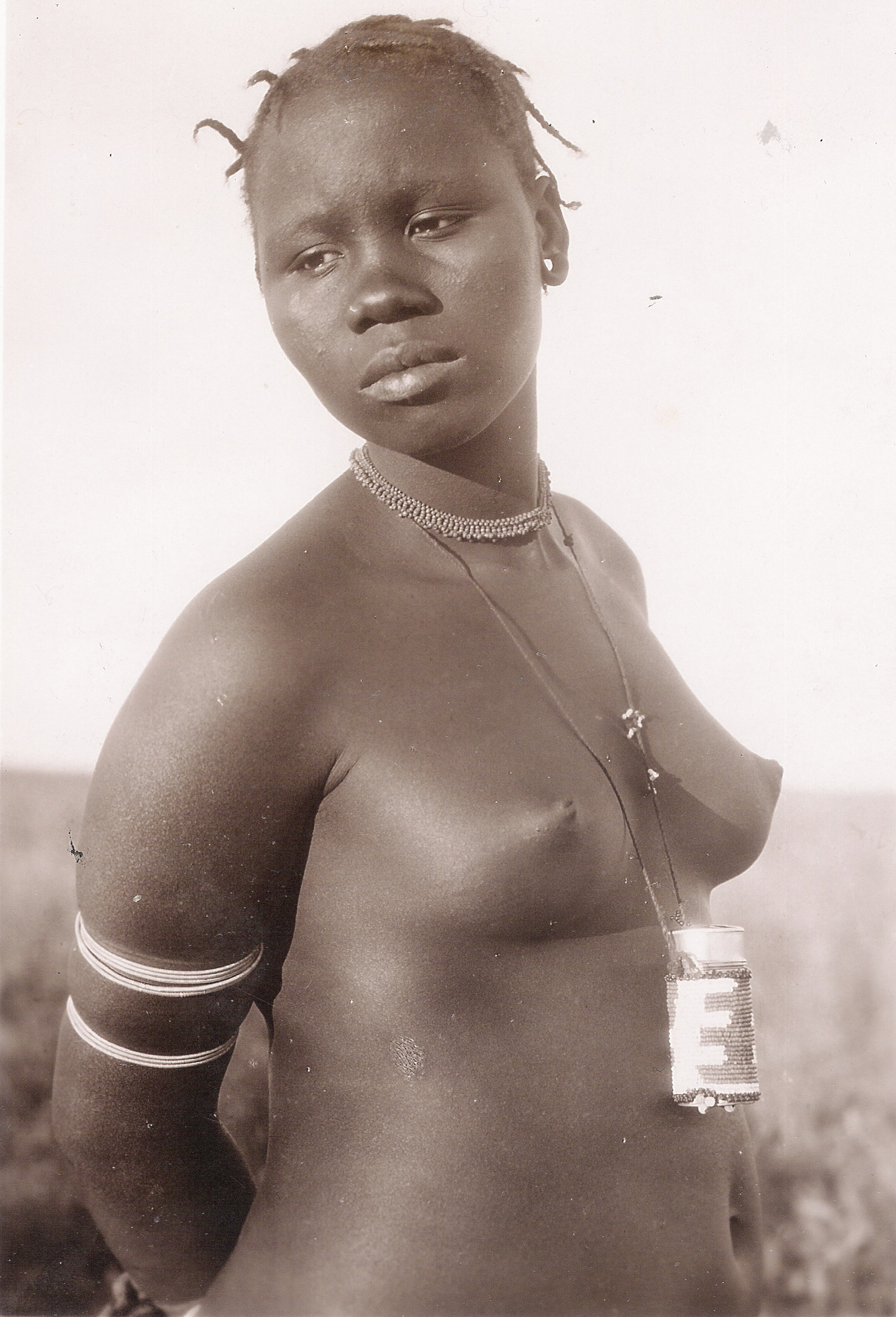
Italian postcard from 1937, purporting to show an enslaved Cyrenaican (Libyan) woman. Sensualised depiction of slavery was a common cultural trope of the early 20th century.

Adolf Vischer writes in an article published in 1911 that: "...it has been said that slave traffic is still going on on the Benghazi-Wadai route, but it is difficult to test the truth of such an assertion as, in any case, the traffic is carried on secretly". At Kufra, the Egyptian traveller Ahmed Hassanein Bey found out in 1916 that he could buy a girl slave for five pounds sterling while in 1923 he found that the price had risen to 30 to 40 pounds sterling.

While the Trans-Saharan slave trade was still operating in the interior of Libya, where Italian control was weak or non-existing, chattel slavery also existed in the fully Italian controlled coastal areas of Libya long in to the colonial period, despite the slavery prohibition policy of the Italians. African slaves were still used as domestic house slaves in affluent Libyan private households in big coastal cities as Benghazi as late as in the 1920s.

The Danish convert to Islam Knud Holmboe, crossed the Italian Libyan desert in 1930, and was told that slavery is still practiced in Kufra and that he could buy a slave girl for 30 pounds sterling at the Thursday slave market. According to James Richardson's testimony, when he visited Ghadames, most slaves were from Bornu.

The Italians reported to the Advisory Committee of Experts on Slavery in the 1930s that all former slaves in Italian Tripolitania - slavery in Libya was since long formally abolished - were free to leave their former Arab owners if they wished, but that they stayed because they were socially depressed; and that in the oases of Cyrenaica and the interiour of Sanusiya, the Trans-Saharan slave trade had been erased in parallel with Italian conquest, during which 900 slaves had been freed in the Kufra slave market.

=== 21st century ===
Human Rights Watch documented cases of migrants frequently being arbitrarily detained and sold in Libyan detention centers. Amnesty International also noted that migrants traveling through Libya were subject to detention in overcrowded and unhygienic conditions, and torture. The US state department also noted in their 2010 report on human trafficking: "As in previous years, there were isolated reports that women from West and Central Africa were forced into prostitution in Libya. There were also reports that migrants from Georgia were subjected to forced labor in Libya," and argued that the Libyan government did not show significant evidence of effort to prosecute traffickers or protect trafficking victims.

==== Slavery in the post-Gaddafi era ====
Since the overthrow of the Gaddafi government after the First Libyan Civil War in 2011, Libya has been plagued by disorder, leaving migrants with little cash and no papers vulnerable. Libya is a major exit point for African migrants heading to Europe. The International Organization for Migration (IOM) published a report in April 2017 showing that many of the migrants from West, Central and Sahelian Africa heading to Europe are sold as slaves after being detained by people smugglers or militia groups. African countries south of Libya were targeted for slave trading and transferred to Libyan slave markets instead. According to the victims, the price is higher for migrants with skills like painting and tiling. Slaves are often ransomed to their families and until ransom can be paid are tortured, forced to work, sometimes to death and eventually executed or left to starve if they can't pay for too long. Women are often raped and used as sex slaves and sold to brothels and private Libyan clients. Many child migrants also suffer from abuse and child rape in Libya.

After receiving unverified CNN video of a November 2017 slave auction in Libya, a human trafficker told Al-Jazeera that hundreds of migrants are bought and sold across the country every week. Migrants who have gone through Libyan detention centres have shown signs of many human rights abuses such as severe abuse, including electric shocks, burns, lashes and even skinning, stated the director of health services on the Italian island of Lampedusa to Euronews.

A Libyan group known as the Asma Boys have antagonized migrants from other parts of Africa from at least as early as 2000, destroying their property. Nigerian migrants in January 2018 gave accounts of abuses in detention centres, including being leased or sold as slaves. Videos of Sudanese migrants being burnt and whipped for ransom, were released later on by their families on social media. In June 2018, the United Nations applied sanctions against four Libyans (including a Coast Guard commander) and two Eritreans for their criminal leadership of slave trade networks.

A 2023 report by the UN Human Rights Council warned that crimes against humanity were being committed by state security forces and militia groups against migrants in Libya, which included women being forced into sexual slavery. The report highlighted that the European Union contributed to these crimes by sending support to such forces.

==== Reactions ====
The governments of Burkina Faso and the Democratic Republic of the Congo responded to the reports by recalling their ambassadors from Libya. The CNN report incited outrage. Hundreds of protesters, mostly young black people, protested in front of the Libyan embassy in central Paris, with French police firing tear gas to disperse them. Moussa Faki Mahamat, chairman of the African Union Commission, called the auctions "despicable". Protests also took place outside Libyan embassies in Bamako, Conakry and Yaoundé. UN Secretary-General António Guterres stated that he was horrified by the auction footage and these crimes should be investigated as possible crimes against humanity. Hundreds protested outside the Libyan Embassy on 9 December 2017 in London.

President of Niger Mahamadou Issoufou summoned the Libyan ambassador and demanded the International Court of Justice to investigate Libya for slave trade. Foreign minister of Burkina Faso Alpha Barry also stated he had summoned the Libyan ambassador for consultations. France on 22 November 2017 sought an emergency meeting of UN Security Council, while President Emmanuel Macron called the footage "scandalous" and "unacceptable." He called the auctions a crime against humanity. President of Nigeria Muhammadu Buhari stated that Nigerians were being treated like goats and stated stranded Nigerian migrants in Libya will be brought back.

The African Union, European Union and United Nations agreed on 30 November 2017 to set up a task force in Libya against migrant abuse. The task force's aim is to coordinate its work with the GNA to dismantle trafficking and criminal networks. It also aims to help countries of origin and transit hubs to tackle migration with development and stability. African and European leaders agreed on the same day to evacuate the migrants trapped in camps. Former Nigerian aviation minister Femi Fani-Kayode published images on Twitter claiming that slaves were having their organs harvested and some of their bodies are burnt. He also quoted a report claiming that 75% of the slaves are from southern Nigeria. It was unclear however whether his images were authentic.

A Ghanaian lawyer, Bobby Banson, also claimed that the organs of the migrants were being harvested and they were not being sold for work. He requested African Union to set up an ad-hoc committee to investigate the slave trade.

In 2017, the progressive media watchdog organization FAIR accused the mainstream media in Western nations of whitewashing the role NATO and the United States played in the resurgence of open slave markets in Libya, following the NATO-led ousting of Muammar Qadhafi in 2011.

==== NCHRL accusations of exaggerated reporting ====
In November 2017, the National Commission for Human Rights in Libya (NCHRL) claimed that the media reports of slavery in Libya were exaggerated, and that while slavery existed in Libya, it was also rare as well. Slave auctions, the commission said, are "such rare sights" and "are very discrete and clandestine". The commission also called for the Libyan government to stamp out the illegal practice of slavery as well.

== See also ==
- That Most Precious Merchandise: The Mediterranean Trade in Black Sea Slaves, 1260-1500
- African slave trade
- Human trafficking in Libya
- Slavery in contemporary Africa
- Islamic views on slavery
- Afro-Arabs
- Slavery in the Ottoman Empire
- 2011 military intervention in Libya
- Timeline of abolition of slavery and serfdom
