= 100F =

100F may refer to:

- Fujichrome Provia 100F (RDP III), a professional color reversal film by Fujifilm
- Fujichrome Velvia 100F (RVP 100F), a highly color-saturated professional color reversal film by Fujifilm
