= Fortia =

Fortia may refer to:

- Fortià, a municipality in Catalonia, Spain
- ForTIA, a non-governmental organisation aiming to support the industrial use of formal methods
- Fortia (film) and Fortia SP, brands of color reversal film by Fujifilm
- Château Fortia, a French wine-producing estate in Châteauneuf-du-Pape
- Albert Jorquera i Fortià (born 1979), Spanish retired football goalkeeper
- Suleiman Fortia, a member of the Libyan National Transitional Council
- Fortia (harvestman), a genus of Opiliones
