= Night photography =

Capturing photos at night

Night Photography
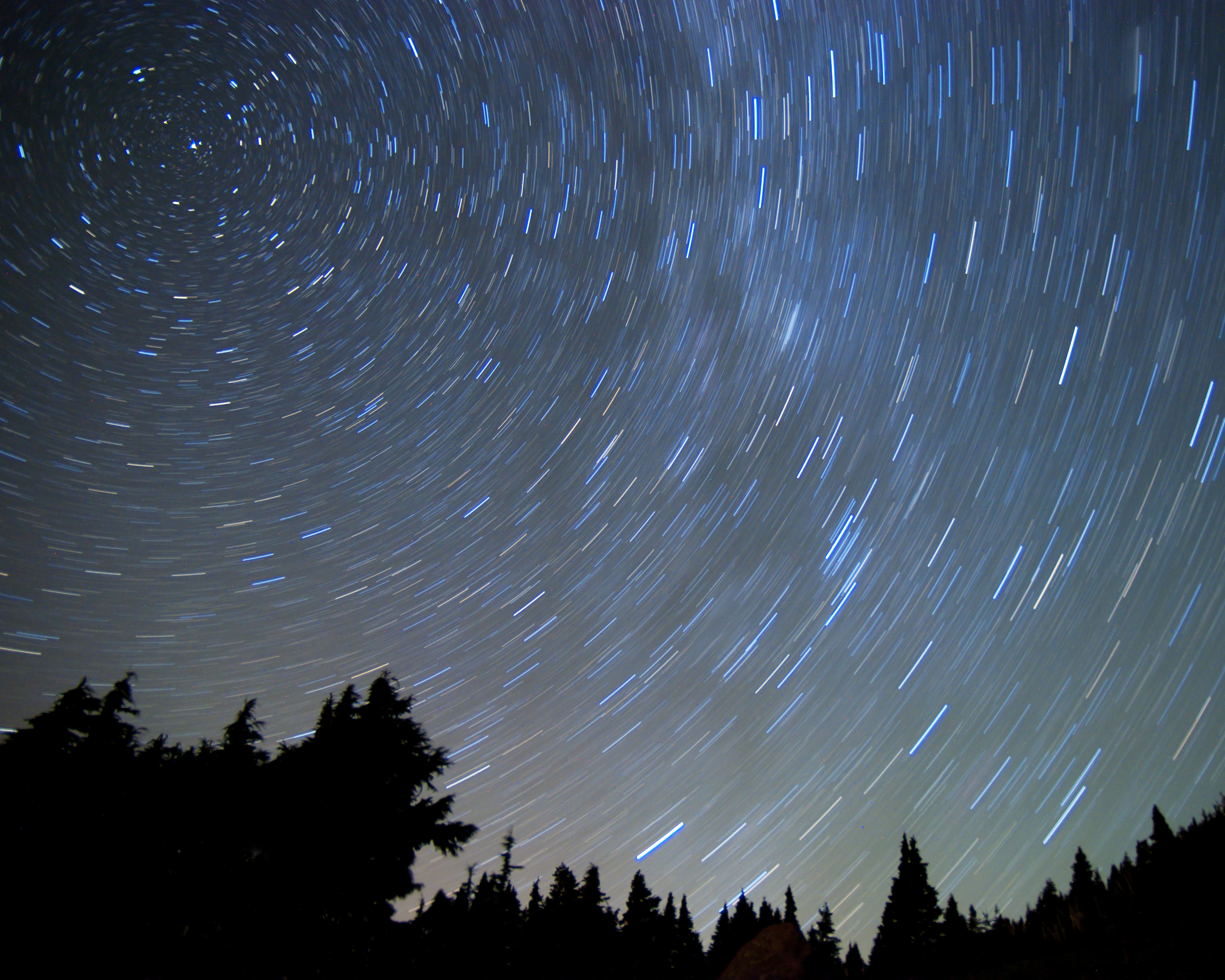
- A long-exposure image of star trails in the night sky above Mount Hood National Forest, Washington, facing north at 6,600 ft (2,000 m) above sea level

Night photography (also called nighttime photography) refers to the practice of taking photographs outdoors between dusk and dawn, when natural light is minimal or nonexistent. Recognized as a photographic genre for more than a century, it is valued for its distinctive visual atmosphere and expressive potential. This status has been reinforced by major institutional exhibitions such as Night Vision at the Metropolitan Museum of Art and Night Light: A Survey of 20th Century Night Photography, organized by the Nelson-Atkins Museum of Art in 1989, which toured nationally; both exhibitions underscored the genre's historical and artistic significance.

The low-light conditions night photographers work in require specialized techniques to achieve proper exposure, including long exposures—ranging from several seconds to days—higher ISO sensitivity, or artificial lighting. Advances in cameras, lenses, high-speed films, and high-sensitivity digital sensors have made it increasingly feasible to photograph at night using only available light, resulting in a growing body of nocturnal photography. Software innovations have also further expanded the creative and technical possibilities of low-light photography.

The genre encompasses a wide range of subjects, including urban and rural landscapes, architecture, industrial sites, and astrophotography. In addition to its technical applications, night photography has contributed significantly to both artistic and documentary traditions since the 19th century.

== History ==
=== Early experiments (1839–1880s) ===
Night photography emerged alongside the earliest photographic processes, though initial attempts were primarily scientific rather than artistic. These early experiments focused on astronomical subjects rather than the urban or terrestrial scenes that would later characterize the genre. Louis Jacques Mandé Daguerre attempted to photograph the Moon on January 2, 1839, using his newly invented daguerreotype process. However, tracking errors during the extended exposure resulted in an indistinct image.

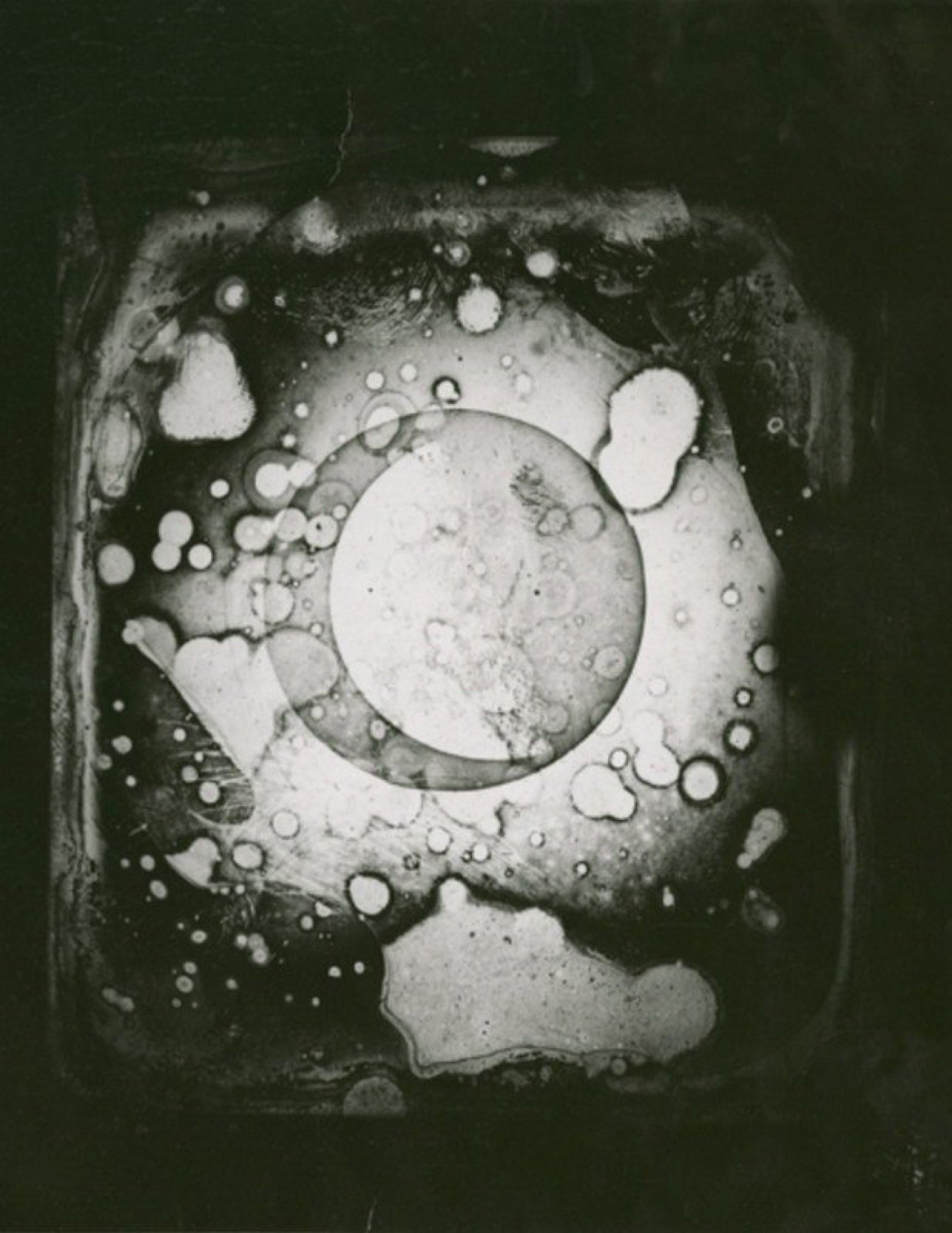
The first moon photograph by John W. Draper, 1840

The first documented successful lunar photograph was achieved by John William Draper on March 23, 1840. Working from his New York University rooftop with a 5-inch (13 cm) reflector, Draper used an exposure time of approximately 20 minutes. This photograph, recognized as the first clear representation of the moon's surface, established the foundation for astrophotography. Subsequent technical developments, particularly mechanical clock drives that compensated for Earth's rotation, enabled photographers to capture increasingly detailed images of the night sky.

=== Late 19th-century developments (1870s–1900) ===
Technological advances in the second half of the 19th century made artistic night photography increasingly practical. The introduction of gelatin dry plate negatives, first proposed by Richard Leach Maddox in 1871 and developed into a commercially viable process by the 1880s, significantly increased photographic sensitivity and reduced exposure times compared to earlier wet collodion methods. These improvements enabled photographers to document urban environments under low-light conditions.

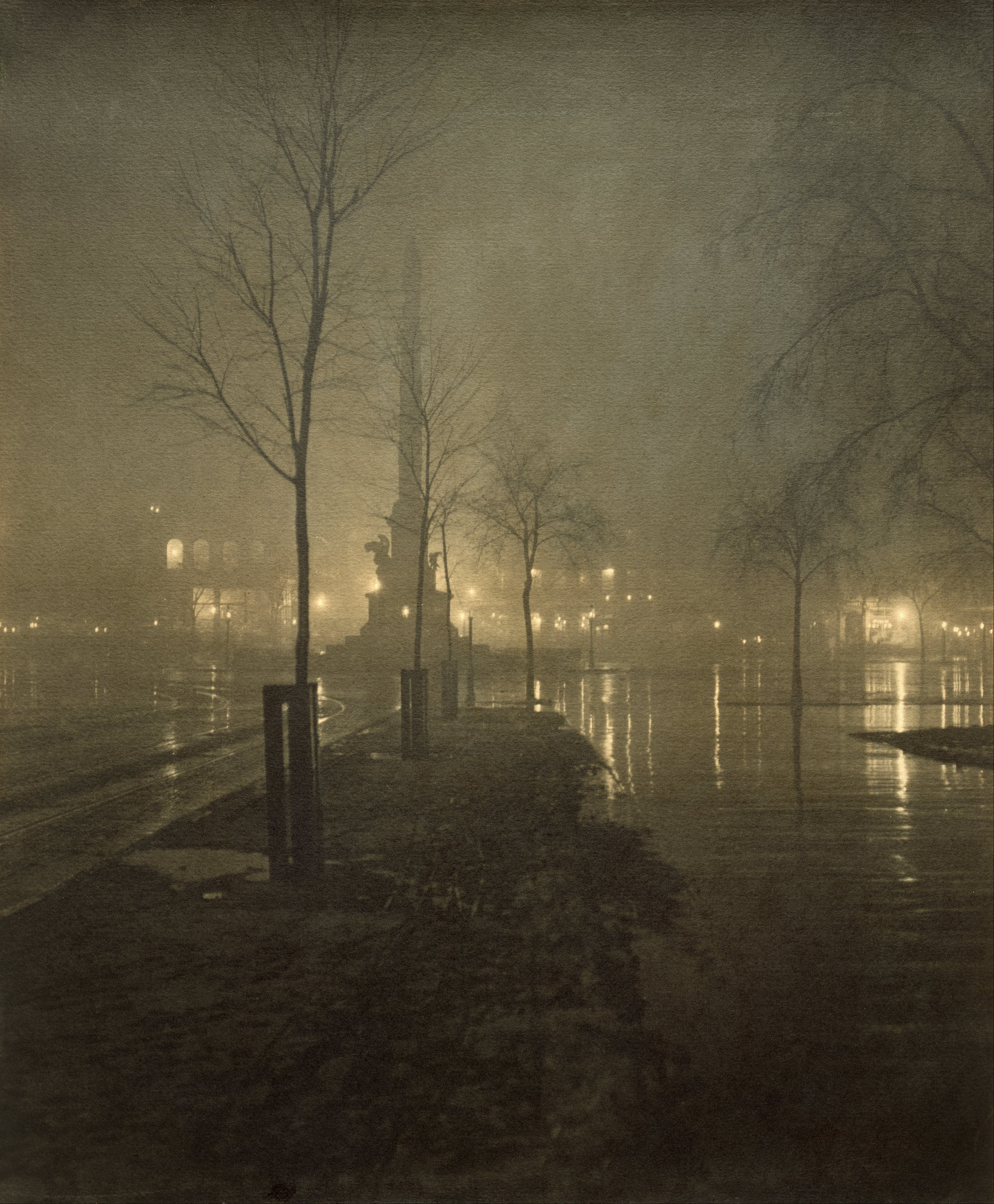
A Wet Night, Columbus Circle by William A. Fraser

Photographers began experimenting with nocturnal subjects including gas-lit streets, moonlit architecture, and carefully staged scenes. British photographer Paul Martin's London by Gaslight series (1896) represented one of the earliest successful artistic applications of controlled illumination in night photography, subsequently influencing Alfred Stieglitz's nocturnal work.

By the 1890s, night photographs began appearing in exhibitions and photographic salons, marking the medium's recognition as a legitimate artistic subject. A Wet Night, Columbus Circle (c. 1897–98) by William A. Fraser exemplifies this period's achievements.

=== Pictorialism and the Photo-Secession (1900–1930s) ===
The early 20th century saw the emergence of night photography as an expressive artistic medium. Alfred Stieglitz developed innovative techniques for capturing urban scenes under low-light and adverse weather conditions, exemplified by his photograph Spring Showers (1900). Following the establishment of the Photo-Secession movement in 1902, Stieglitz and his associates embraced night photography for its expressive and symbolic potential, aligning with Pictorialist objectives to elevate photography to the status of fine art.

The proliferation of electric street lighting after the 1880s created new aesthetic possibilities, encouraging photographers to explore relationships between artificial illumination, natural light, and shadow in urban environments. Despite these advances, night photography remained relatively uncommon during this period, with most practitioners creating isolated images rather than sustained bodies of work.

This approach began to change in the 1930s with Brassaï's Paris de nuit (1932), a self-published volume that brought widespread attention to night photography as a serious artistic genre. Working with a tripod and slow film, Brassaï documented Parisian streets, cafés, brothels, and fog-shrouded alleys, creating atmospheric images that captured the psychological dimensions of the nocturnal city. British photographer Bill Brandt, influenced by Brassaï's work, began his A Night in London project, utilizing wartime blackout conditions to photograph scenes illuminated only by moonlight and ambient sources, supplemented by newly developed flashbulbs. Both photographers produced the first comprehensive bodies of night photography, establishing it as a distinct photographic genre.

=== Mid-Century innovation (1940s–1950s) ===
The postwar period through the 1950s witnessed night photography's development as both a documentary and expressive medium, influenced by urbanization, cultural shifts, and significant technical advances. Arthur Fellig, known professionally as Weegee, developed a distinctive approach beginning in the late 1930s and continuing through the 1950s. In contrast to Brassaï's atmospheric imagery, Weegee documented New York City's nocturnal underworld of crime and violence. His flash-illuminated scenes of criminal activity and urban spectacle combined photojournalistic documentation with sensationalistic presentation, utilizing the fast sheet films and powerful flashbulbs available at the time.

O. Winston Link represented another significant development in mid-century night photography, distinguished by technical ambition and nostalgic subject matter. Beginning in the late 1940s, Link photographed steam locomotives of the Norfolk and Western Railway, the last major American railroad operating steam engines in commercial service. Anticipating their obsolescence, Link undertook a comprehensive documentation project of the disappearing steam era. His nighttime photographs employed elaborate multi-flash lighting arrangements requiring extensive planning and staging. Works such as Hotshot Eastbound (1956) combined technical precision with romanticized depictions of mid-century American life. Link's innovations advanced the technical capabilities of flash photography and influenced subsequent night photography practice.

==== Technical advances of the 1950s ====
The 1950s brought significant technological developments that impacted night photography practice. The introduction of faster film emulsions, notably Kodak Tri-X in 1954 roll-film formats, enabled handheld photography and shorter exposure times under low-light conditions. Simultaneously, improvements in artificial lighting technology, including more reliable flashbulbs and the emergence of compact electronic strobes, expanded creative and practical possibilities for night photographers, supporting increased mobility and expressive control.

=== Expansion and diversification (1960s–1990s) ===
From the 1960s through the mid-1990s, night photography evolved from a specialized practice into an established component of contemporary photographic art, embraced by diverse practitioners and artistic approaches.

==== Pioneering contemporary approaches ====
Richard Misrach's Night Desert series (1975–1977) marked a significant development in contemporary fine art night photography. Working in the Nevada desert, Misrach employed strobe lighting to illuminate desert flora—cacti, creosote bushes, and other vegetation—against dark backgrounds, creating images that combined naturalistic documentation with surreal visual effects. The project's integration of stark desert landscapes with theatrical lighting techniques, combined with Misrach's distinctive split-tone printing process, advanced night photography toward conceptual artistic practice. Critics have noted that Night Desert established atmospheric and technical approaches that influenced Misrach's subsequent large-format color work and inspired later photographers exploring nocturnal landscape photography.

Steve Fitch, a colleague of Misrach, contributed to the development of contemporary night photography through his systematic documentation of roadside America during the 1970s and 1980s. Working primarily in the American West, Fitch employed long exposures to capture illuminated motels, diners, and drive-in theaters against the darkness of rural landscapes. His series including Diesels and Dinosaurs and Vanishing Vernacular documented the changing character of highway culture, utilizing available artificial light sources to reveal architectural details and signage. Fitch's approach combined documentary methodology with aesthetic consideration, creating a visual archive of American roadside culture while establishing night photography as a means of cultural documentation.

George Tice established night photography within fine art photography traditions through work that combined documentary precision with poetic sensibility. As a master printer and formalist, Tice demonstrated exceptional tonal control in his nocturnal images of American towns and industrial subjects. His photograph Petit's Mobil Station, Cherry Hill, New Jersey (1974) transforms a suburban gas station into a contemplative scene through fluorescent illumination and is now held in major museum collections including the Museum of Modern Art, Toledo Museum of Art, Museum of Fine Arts, Houston, Cleveland Museum of Art, Nelson-Atkins Museum of Art, Birmingham Museum of Art, Rhode Island School of Design Museum, and the Minneapolis Institute of Art.

==== Twilight and transitional light ====
Joel Meyerowitz and Jan Staller significantly expanded night photography through their exploration of twilight and transitional lighting conditions. Meyerowitz, primarily known for color street photography, investigated atmospheric possibilities during dusk in his Cape Light series (1978). Working along the Massachusetts coastline with an 8×10 view camera, he documented the interplay between natural and artificial light during the "blue hour" following sunset, emphasizing the painterly qualities of ambient twilight.

Concurrently, Staller's Frontier New York series (1977–1984) documented abandoned sections of the West Side Highway. His work utilized the distinctive orange cast of sodium vapor streetlights against fading daylight to create urban landscape photographs.

Staller's approach emphasized the sculptural qualities of roadside infrastructure and urban decay, presenting industrial subjects with monumental character through twilight's transformative illumination. Both photographers established twilight as a legitimate subject for sustained artistic investigation, expanding aesthetic possibilities within the transitional period between day and night.

==== International and street photography approaches ====
Japanese photographer Daidō Moriyama incorporated night photography as a central element in his street photography practice. A key figure in the Provoke movement, Moriyama was influenced by William Klein and Jack Kerouac, and developed a distinctive style emphasizing urban disorder and visual fragmentation. Working handheld in dimly lit streets, he employed high-contrast, heavily grained techniques with intentional blur to depict nocturnal cityscapes.

Characterized by harsh shadows, neon illumination, and distorted perspectives, his images prioritized subjective interpretation over conventional documentary clarity. Moriyama's approach utilized night photography as a vehicle for artistic expression rather than observational documentation. His later Women in the Night series (1990s) demonstrated a shift toward controlled interior scenes, contrasting with the spontaneous street photography that defined his earlier work.

==== The New Topographics influence ====
Robert Adams, long associated with the New Topographics movement, made a significant contribution to the night photography genre when he published Summer Nights (1985), later expanded as Summer Nights, Walking (2009). Influential to many night photographers, including Alec Soth and Todd Hido, Adams' series captured suburban scenes in Colorado during dusk and early night. Portraying trees, houses, and empty streets in soft light and deep shadow, Adams's images explore intimacy, quietude, and the fragile beauty of everyday life.

==== Minimalism ====
British photographer Michael Kenna emerged as a commercially successful practitioner specializing in meditative night photography. Kenna's black-and-white landscapes, typically photographed between dusk and dawn, encompassed locations including San Francisco, Japan, France, and England. His subjects ranged from industrial sites such as Ford Motor Company's Rouge River plant and England's Ratcliffe-on-Soar Power Station to historically significant locations including Nazi concentration camps across Europe.

=== The digital revolution and contemporary practice (1990s–present) ===
Night photography has developed into a diverse field since the late 20th century, shaped by technological innovations and expanding artistic approaches. Digital photography has emerged as a viable medium offering enhanced sensitivity and control under low-light conditions. Contemporary night photography encompasses staged and cinematic tableaux, suburban narratives, street photography, astrophotography, light painting, and site-specific urban and landscape documentation. These varied practices reflect the genre's expansion from its early specialized origins into a conceptually and aesthetically diverse field integrated into broader photographic practice.

==== Digital technology impact ====
The introduction of digital cameras in the late 20th century marked a transformative period for night photography. Improvements in sensor sensitivity (ISO performance), noise reduction capabilities, and dynamic range enabled documentation of scenes previously impractical to capture on film, particularly under low-light conditions. Digital systems allowed immediate exposure review, encouraging experimentation with extended exposures, color balance, and artificial lighting techniques. These developments increased night photography's accessibility to broader practitioner communities and enabled new approaches including high-ISO handheld work, light painting, and digitally composited imagery.

Advanced image-processing software further enhanced night photography possibilities. Programs including Adobe Photoshop, Lightroom, Capture One Pro, and DxO PhotoLab provide sophisticated noise reduction, tonal adjustment, and color correction capabilities. Techniques such as exposure stacking and high dynamic range (HDR) imaging became standard practices in astrophotography and urban night photography. Many photographers continuing to work with film photography now employ digital tools during scanning and post-production, establishing hybrid workflows as standard contemporary practice.

==== Continued film evolution ====
Film photography technology continued evolving into the 21st century, maintaining relevance despite digital photography's advances. High-speed emulsions such as Kodak T-MAX P3200, reintroduced in 2018, provided expanded creative possibilities for handheld photography under low-light conditions. Slide films including Fuji Velvia and Fuji Provia incorporated improved reciprocity failure control, reducing color shifts and sensitivity loss during extended exposures. These refinements ensured analog workflows remained viable for photographers attracted to film's distinctive tonal and color characteristics.

=== Leading contemporary practitioners ===
Todd Hido is an American photographer renowned for his luminous color images of suburban houses at night, devoid of people, often illuminated solely by the glow of interior lights visible through windows. His work blends documentary and psychological elements, evoking a sense that "the planet on which we exist seems like unfamiliar territory; strange and bewildering." Hido typically employs long exposures and available light, producing images that balance realism and fiction. His night photographs have been widely exhibited and collected, and are frequently cited as influential within the genre.

Gregory Crewdson is known for his elaborately staged and theatrical photographs depicting the iconography of everyday objects and figures within the American landscape. He approaches night photography through elaborate, engineered productions that draw heavily on cinematic language. Working with large crews, film lights, and extensive set design, Crewdson constructs nocturnal tableaux depicting small-town streets, houses, and interiors with heightened dramatic tension. While technically rooted in photography, his large-format images blur the line between still photography and film production. Crewdson's work has expanded the scope of night photography by demonstrating how the medium can operate on a theatrical and narrative scale.

==== Diverse contemporary approaches ====
Contemporary night photography has diversified through various artistic and technical approaches beyond Hido's and Crewdson's established methods. Australian photographer Trent Parke has integrated night photography into street photography practice, employing dramatic contrast and available light to create psychologically charged urban imagery. Barbara Bosworth has incorporated astrophotography into landscape photography, emphasizing the cosmic dimensions of nocturnal imagery. Light painting has gained prominence through Troy Paiva's ongoing documentation of abandoned spaces illuminated with handheld lights during extended exposures.

These developments have been influenced by Lance Keimig's photographic practice and his publication Night Photography: Finding Your Way in the Dark (2010), which has become an established resource for photographers exploring night photography techniques.

==== Regional and documentary projects ====
The genre has expanded through numerous site-specific and documentary initiatives. Dave Jordano's Detroit Nocturne (2018) documented the city's nighttime urban landscape, reflecting themes of urban transformation and decay. Peter Ydeen's more intimate series Easton Nights, inspired by George Tice, presents what is described as "a narrative of Easton on one hand and the American journey, as a whole, on the other." Patrick Joust has produced extensive documentation of Baltimore's nighttime character over more than a decade. Through focus on specific urban nighttime landscapes, these photographers demonstrate night photography's development as a regionally grounded practice, revealing local particularities while addressing broader cultural narratives.

== Moonlight photography ==
Moonlight photography (capturing scenes on Earth illuminated by moonlight) greatly differs from lunar photography (capturing scenes on the Moon illuminated by direct sunlight). The Moon has an effective albedo of approximately 0.12, comparable to worn asphalt concrete. Since the Moon is essentially a dark body in direct sunlight, photographing its surface needs an exposure comparable to what a photographer would use for ordinary, mid-brightness surfaces (buildings, trees, faces, etc.) with an overcast sky.

The sunlight reflected from the full Moon onto Earth is about 1/250,000 of the brightness of direct sunlight in daytime. Since log_{2}(250,000) = 17.93..., full-moon photography requires 18 stops more exposure than sunlight photography, for which the sunny 16 rule is a commonly used guideline.

== Flash photography ==
Flash photography is the process of using artificial lighting to illuminate an object or scene. Flashes are used to stop a moving object in motion. Typically this is done with wireless strobes strategically placed to control the spread of light on a scene. These lights have radio receivers and are triggered by a transmitter placed in the camera's hotshoe and sends a signal once the camera's shutter is pressed. Before modern DSLR cameras and electronic flashes, flashes were wired for power and trigger signal. These lights sometimes had 1–25 individual lightbulbs. These lightbulbs were only good for one-time use. After the photo they would have to be replaced.

== Equipment used by notable night photographers ==
A comprehensive overview of cameras, lenses, and techniques used by influential night photography practitioners.

Photographer	Active period	Primary camera(s)	Lenses	Film/sensor	Lighting equipment	Notable techniques
Early pioneers (1840s–1920s)
Louis Daguerre	1839	Camera obscura Daguerreotype camera	Custom telescope attachment	Treated silver-plated copper sheets with iodine	Natural moonlight	First attempted lunar photography
John William Draper	1840	Daguerreotype camera	3-inch lens (76mm)	Daguerreotype plates	Natural moonlight (with heliostat)	First successful moon photograph
Artistic pioneers (1900s–1940s)
Alfred Stieglitz	1900s–1920s	Large format view cameras	Various large format lenses	Glass plates, early film	Available light	Pioneered artistic night street photography
Brassaï	1930s	Voigtländer Bergheil	Standard 105mm lens	Glass plates initially, later film	Street lights, available urban lighting	Long exposures up to 15 minutes; Paris de Nuit series (1933)
Bill Brandt	1940s	Rolleiflex	75 mm Tessar f/3.5 lens	120 roll film	Moonlight during London blackouts	Exploited WWII blackout conditions
Mid to late 20th century (1950s–1980s)
O. Winston Link	1950s	4×5 Speed Graphic	Wide-angle view camera lenses	4×5 sheet film	Multiple synchronized flash units (up to 18 light banks)	Elaborate flash staged setups; documented last steam trains
George Tice	1960s–early 2000s	8×10 Deardorff view camera	Large format lenses, wide-angle to normal	Glass Negatives (occasional sheet film)	Available light, twilight conditions	Paterson, NJ series; urban landscapes at dusk
Daido Moriyama	1960s–1980s	Ricoh GR series, Nikon F, Nikon Coolpix including S9500, S9100, S7000	Wide-angle lenses, 28mm preferred	35mm B&W film, high contrast	Available street lighting, neon signs	Gritty urban night scenes; high grain aesthetic
Robert Adams	1970s–1980s	Hasselblad 500 series	80mm and 60mm lenses	Medium format B&W film	Natural and available light	Quiet suburban and semi-rural nightscapes; subtle tonal range
Joel Meyerowitz	1970s	8×10 Deardorff view camera	Wide-angle view camera lenses	8×10 color negative film	Natural twilight, available light	Cape Light series; large format color
Richard Misrach	1975–1977	2¼ medium format camera / 8×10 large format view camera	Various view camera lenses	B&W roll film for 2¼ and sheet film for color	Strobe light	Desert flora series / Stonehenge / The Acropolis: long exposures
Jan Staller	1977–1984	Large format view camera	Wide-angle view camera lenses	Color negative sheet film	Sodium vapor street lights	Urban decay documentation; color temperature mixing
Contemporary era (1990s–present)
Michael Kenna	1990s–present	Hasselblad 503CW, Pentax 67	Wide-angle to normal lenses	Ilford FP4+, HP5+ (B&W)	Available light, moonlight	Long exposures (up to 10 hours); minimalist compositions
Todd Hido	1990s–present	Mamiya RZ67, later digital medium format	Medium format lenses	Color negative, later digital	Suburban house lighting, street lights	Suburban night scenes; warm artificial lighting
Troy Paiva	2000s–present	Canon EOS series DSLRs	Wide-angle zooms, 14–24mm	Digital sensors	Colored gels, flashlights, LED panels	Light painting techniques; abandoned locations
Lance Keimig	2000s–present	Canon 5D series, Nikon D850	14–24mm f/2.8, 24–70mm f/2.8	Full-frame digital sensors	LED panels, flashlights, light painting tools	Teaching workshops; technical innovation

== Notable exhibitions ==
Notable exhibitions that have focused on night photography include the following:

- Bill Brandt: Shadow and Light – Museum of Modern Art, New York, 1969. Updated retrospective at the Victoria and Albert Museum, London, 2013. Not exclusively focused on night photography but included night interiors and urban scenes.
- Robert Adams: Summer Nights – Fraenkel Gallery, San Francisco, 1985, and Summer Nights, Walking – Matthew Marks Gallery, New York, 2010. Two exhibitions showcasing Robert Adams' black-and-white photographs of suburban Colorado nightscapes made between 1976 and 1985.
- Night Light: A Survey of 20th Century Night Photography – Nelson-Atkins Museum of Art, Kansas City, 1989. Curated by Keith F. Davis, this traveling exhibition showcased significant 20th-century night photography and toured the United States from 1989 to 1991.
- Brassaï – Centre Pompidou, Paris, 2000. Later toured to the Galleria d'Arte Moderna e Contemporanea in Verona, Italy; the Ludwig Museum in Budapest, Hungary; and the Tokyo Metropolitan Museum of Photography, Tokyo.
- Todd Hido: House Hunting – Julie Saul Gallery, New York, US (September 8 – October 20, 2001); Cleveland Museum of Art, Cleveland, Ohio (2002); Kemper Museum of Contemporary Art, Kansas City, Missouri (2002, as part of Open House)
- Gregory Crewdson: Twilight – Luhring Augustine Gallery, New York (February 19 – March 25, 2000); Gagosian Gallery, Beverly Hills (June 29 – August 3, 2002); Victoria and Albert Museum, London (October 10 – December 17, 2006, part of Twilight: Photography in the Magic Hour)
- Richard Misrach: Night Photographs 1975–1977 – Fraenkel Gallery, San Francisco, California, US (November 1 – December 22, 2007).
- Night Vision – The Metropolitan Museum of Art, New York, 2011. Group exhibition featuring 20th-century photography made after dark.
- Troy Paiva: Lost America – Bolinas Museum, Bolinas, California, US (April 23 – June 5, 2011).
- Peter Ydeen: Easton Nights – Saint Joseph's University, Philadelphia, Pennsylvania, US (August 2018); Susquehanna Art Museum, Harrisburg, Pennsylvania (April – June 2019); Millersville University, Sykes Gallery, Millersville, Pennsylvania, US (September – October 2020); Albright College, Freedman Gallery, Reading, Pennsylvania, US (October – November 2020); Noyes Museum Arts Garage, Atlantic City, New Jersey, US (2021); AOCF58 Galleria Bruno Lisi, Rome, Italy (October 2022); Sigal Museum, Easton, Pennsylvania, US (June – August 2023).
- Jan Staller: Heavy Metal: Photographs by Jan Staller – Heckscher Museum of Art, Huntington, New York, US (April 21 – July 29, 2018).
- Dave Jordano: Human Landscapes – Cleveland Museum of Art, Cleveland, Ohio (February 4 – June 9, 2024).
- Barbara Bosworth: Sun Light, Moon Shadow – Cleveland Museum of Art, Cleveland, Ohio (July 28, 2024 – March 23, 2025).
- Michael Kenna: Venice – A solo exhibition series featuring Kenna's long-exposure night and twilight photographs of Venice - Sala Parés Gallery, Barcelona, Spain (September 19 – October 19, 2024); Festival Grain d'Pixel, Galerie de l'Ancienne Poste, Besançon, France (September 28 – October 20, 2024); The Hulett Collection, Tulsa, Oklahoma, US (December 7, 2024 – February 15, 2025).

== Published night photographers ==
This section includes the most significant night photographers who have published books dedicated to night photography, and some of their selected works. Additional publications can be found in further reading.

- Robert Adams – Summer nights, walking: along the Colorado front range, 1976–1982 Millerton, NY: Aperture; New Haven, CT: Yale University Art Gallery, 1982
- Bill Brandt – A Night in London: Story of a London Night in Sixty-Four Photographs. London: Country Life; Paris: Arts et Métiers Graphiques; New York: Charles Scribner's Sons, 1938.
- Brassaï – Paris de nuit. Paris: Arts et Métiers Graphiques, 1932.
- Todd Hido
  - Outskirts, Nazraeli, 2002. ISBN 1-59005-028-2
  - House Hunting, Nazraeli, 2001. ISBN 978-3923922963.
  - Bright Black World, Nazraeli Press, 2018. ISBN 9781590055052
- Peter Hujar
  - Night, Matthew Marks Gallery/Fraenkel Gallery, 2005. ISBN 1-880146-45-2
- Lance Keimig – Night Photography: Finding Your Way In The Dark, Focal, 2010. ISBN 978-0-240-81258-8
- Michael Kenna
  - The Rouge, RAM, 1995. ISBN 0-9630785-1-8
  - Night Work, Nazraeli, 2000. ISBN 3-923922-83-3
- O. Winston Link – The Last Steam Railroad in America, Harry Abrams, 1995. ISBN 0-8109-3575-9

== Gallery ==
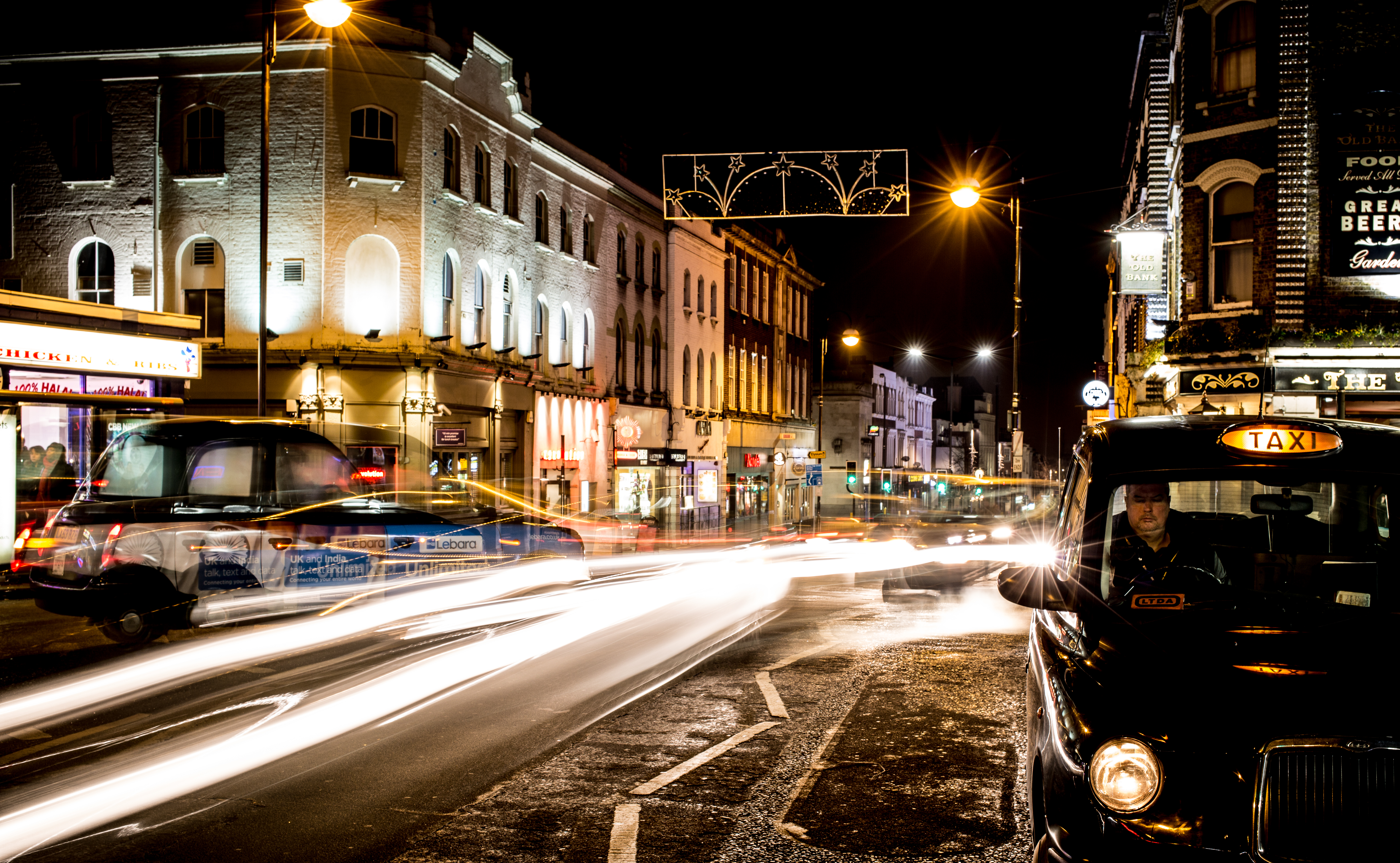
A London taxi turning outside the railway station at Sutton, London

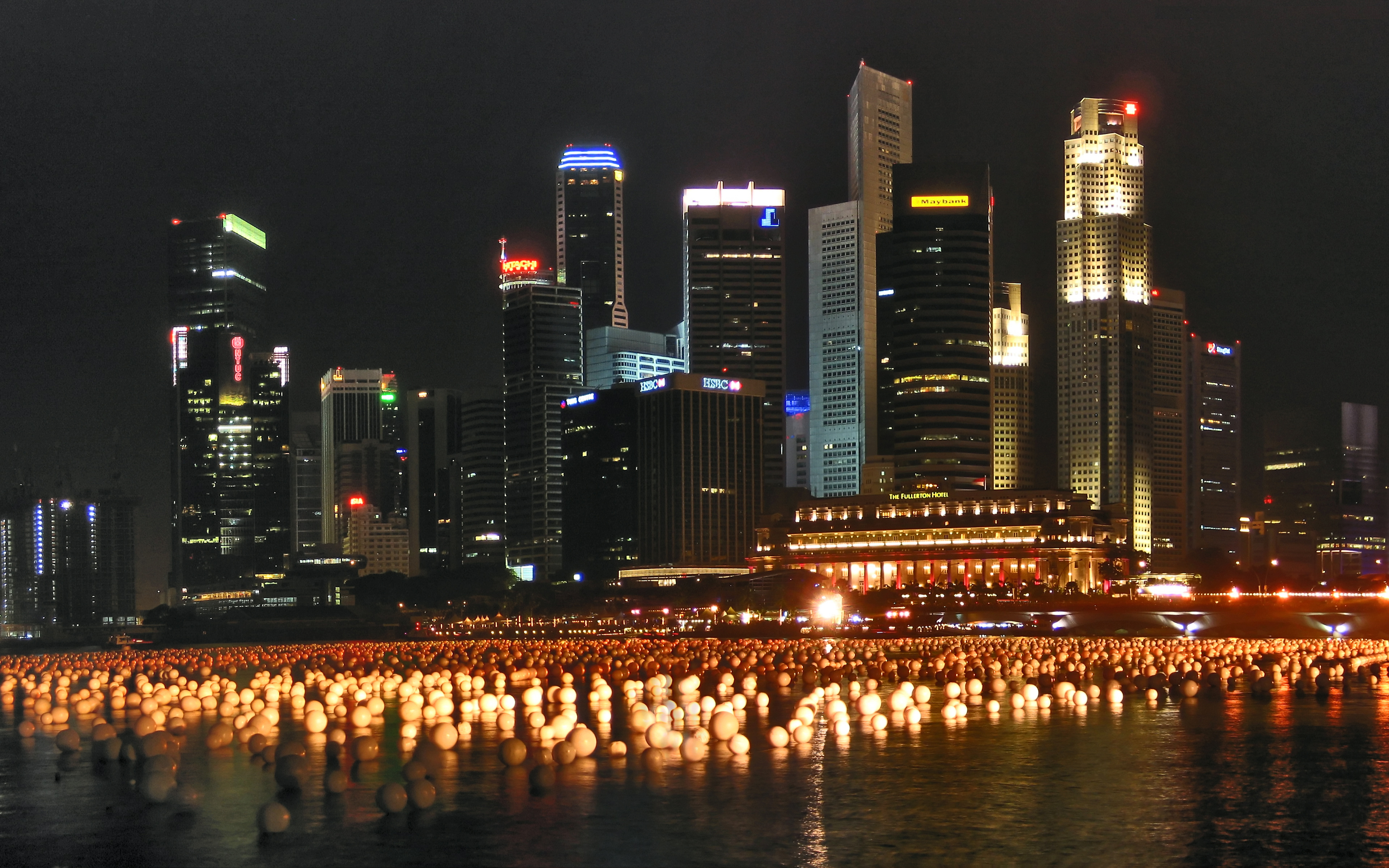
The Singapore skyline at night

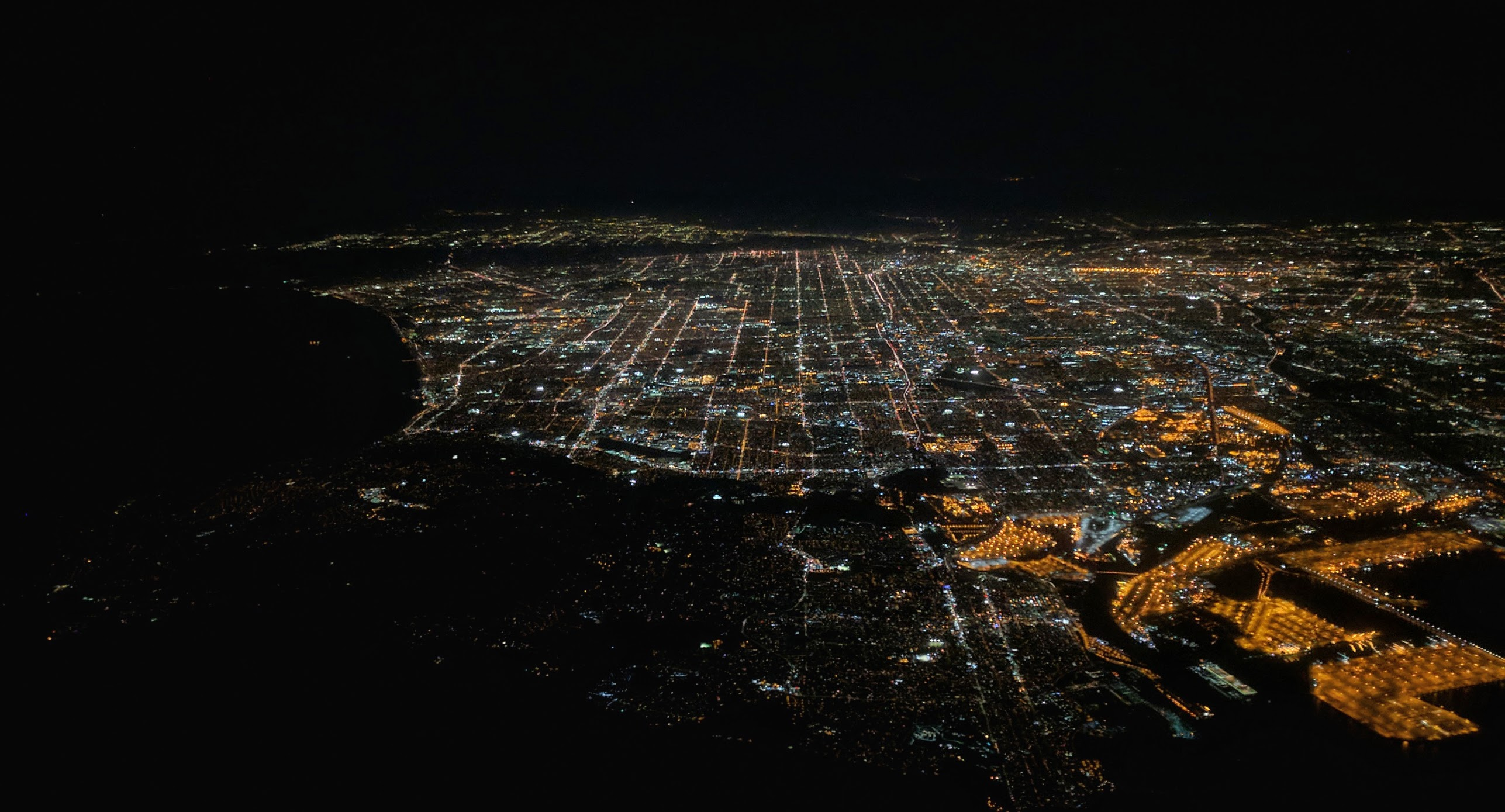
An aerial photograph of Los Angeles County at night

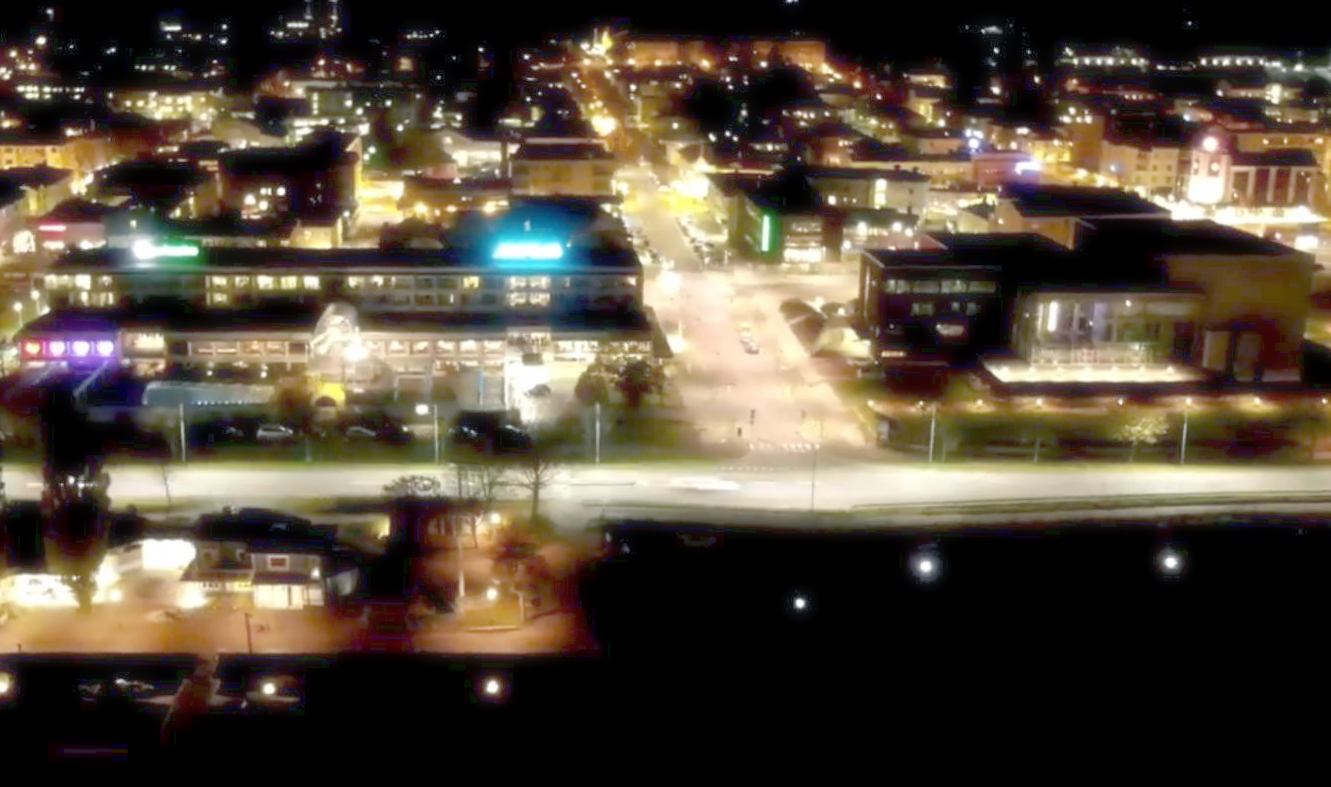
Mariehamn, a capital of Åland, at night

== See also ==
- Light painting
- Astrophotography
