= Looney 11 rule =

Photography rule of thumb

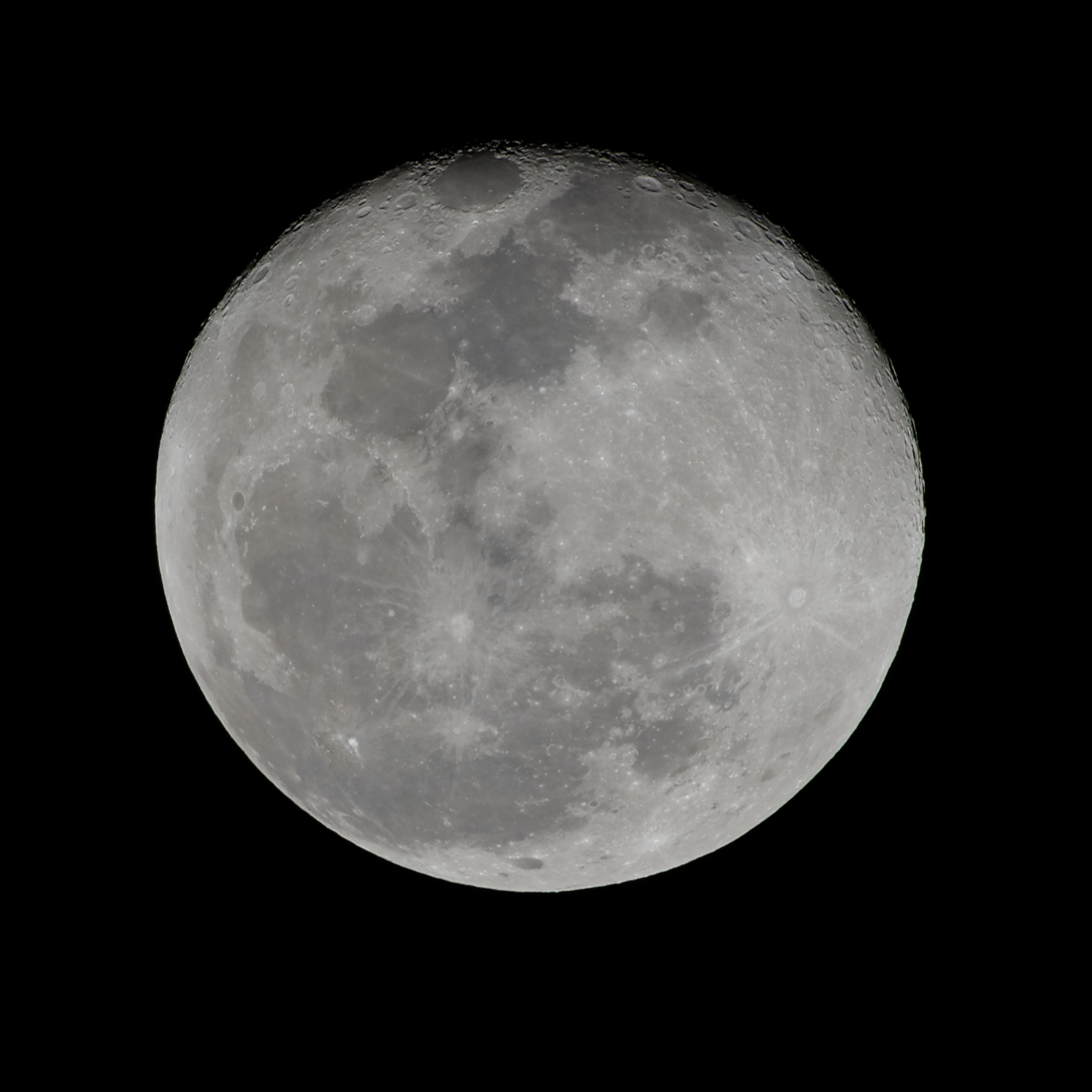
Looney 11 exposure of the Moon - 1/200 second, ISO 200, f/11

In lunar photography, the Looney 11 rule (also known as the Looney f/11 rule) is a method of estimating correct exposures without a light meter. For daylight photography, there is a similar rule called the Sunny 16 rule. The basic rule is: "For astronomical photos of the Moon's surface, set aperture to f/11 and shutter speed to the [reciprocal of the] ISO film speed [or ISO setting]."

- With ISO 100, the photographer should set the shutter speed to 1/100 or 1/125 second. (On some cameras, 1/125 second is the available setting nearest to 1/100 second.)
- With ISO 200, set it to 1/200 or 1/250 second.
- With ISO 400, set it to 1/400 or 1/500 second.

As with other light readings, shutter speed can be changed as long as the f-number is altered to compensate, e.g. 1/250 second at f/8 gives equivalent exposure to 1/125 second at f/11. Generally, the adjustment is done such that for each step in aperture increase (i.e., decreasing the f-number), the exposure time has to be halved (or equivalently, the shutter speed doubled), and vice versa. This follows the more general rule derived from the mathematical relationship between aperture and exposure time—within reasonable ranges, exposure is proportional to the square of the aperture ratio and proportional to exposure time; thus, to maintain a constant level of exposure, a change in aperture by a factor c requires a change in exposure time by a factor 1/c^{2} and vice versa. Steps in aperture correspond to a factor close to the square root of two, so the above rule.

The intensity of visible sunlight striking the surface of the Moon is essentially the same as at the surface of the Earth. The albedo of the Moon's surface material is lower (darker) than that of the Earth's surface, and the Looney 11 rule increases exposure by one stop versus the Sunny 16 rule.

== See also ==
- Astrophotography
- Night photography
- Sunny 16 rule
