= Colin Prior =

British photographer (born 1958)

- Born: 1958 (age 67–68); Milngavie, Scotland, U.K.
- Occupation: Photographer
- Website: colinprior.co.uk

Colin Prior (born 1958 in Milngavie, Glasgow), is a landscape photographer.

Prior takes panoramic landscape photographs of Scotland and around the world. He uses the 617 panoramic format extensively in his work shooting Fuji Velvia generally in the "golden hour" at dawn and dusk. To date, Prior has worked on four calendar commissions for British Airways and has had several solo exhibitions, most notably The Scottish Visual Experience, Land's End and The World's Wild Places.

In 2007, his work on Canna helped boost visitor numbers to the National Trust for Scotland's headquarters.

Prior has appeared on a number of television programmes in the UK, including The Adventure Show (BBC), Landward (BBC), Countryfile (BBC) and Weir's Way (STV). He has also guested on numerous topical programmes on BBC Radio Scotland.

Colin lives in Glasgow with his wife, Geraldine, and two children. He is a Fellow of the Royal Photographic Society and a founding member of the International League of Conservation Photographers.

== Bibliography ==
Highland Wilderness Constable ISBN 978-1845290658

Scotland – The Wild Places Constable, ISBN 978-1841193151

Living Tribes, Constable, ISBN 978-1552977460

The World's Wild Places Constable, ISBN 978-1845293505

High Light Constable, ISBN 978-1849013857

Scotland's Finest Landscapes – The Collector's Edition Constable, ISBN 978-1472111166

The Karakoram: Ice Mountains of Pakistan Merrell, ISBN 978-1858946870

Fragile: Birds, Eggs & Habitats Merrell, ISBN 978-1858946887

== Exhibitions ==
The Scottish Visual Experience, Linhof Gallery, London

Land's End, Museum of Education, Glasgow

The World's Wild Places, OXO Tower Gallery, London

The World's Wild Places, Glasgow Science Centre
