= 1954 in Libya =

- Decades: 1930s; 1940s; 1950s; 1960s; 1970s
- See also: Other events of 1954; List of years in Libya

The following lists events that happened in 1954 in Libya.

== Incumbents ==
- Monarch: Idris
- Prime Minister:
  - until February 16: Mahmud al-Muntasir
  - February 16-April 12: Muhammad Sakizli
  - starting April 12: Mustafa Ben Halim

== Births ==
- Ashour Suleiman Shuwail
- Mansour Bushnaf
- Suleiman Fortia
