= Olympus Stylus SH-2 =

Overview
- Maker: Olympus

Lens
- Lens: 25-600mm equivalent
- F-numbers: f/3.0-f/6.9 at the widest

Sensor/medium
- Sensor type: BSI-CMOS
- Sensor size: 6.17 x 4.55mm (1/2.3 inch type)
- Maximum resolution: 4608 x 3456 (16 megapixels)
- Recording medium: SD, SDHC, or SDXC memory card; internal memory

Shutter
- Shutter speeds: 1/2000s to 30s
- Continuous shooting: 11.5 frames per second

Image processing
- Image processor: TruePic VII
- White balance: Yes

General
- LCD screen: 3 inches with 460,000 dots
- Dimensions: 109 x 63 x 42mm (4.29 x 2.48 x 1.65 inches)
- Weight: 271g including battery

The Olympus Stylus SH-2 is a digital compact camera announced by Olympus Corporation on March 11, 2015. It differs from its predecessor, the Olympus Stylus SH-1, by the addition of raw format output, new nightscape modes and a Live Composite mode that helps with capturing star trails.
