= 1963 in Libya =

- Decades: 1940s; 1950s; 1960s; 1970s; 1980s
- See also: Other events of 1963; List of years in Libya

The following lists events that happened in 1963 in Libya.

== Incumbents ==
- Monarch: Idris
- Prime Minister: Muhammad Osman Said (until March 19), Mohieddin Fikini (starting March 19)

== Events ==
- 1963–64 Libyan Premier League
