= 1961 in Libya =

- Decades: 1940s; 1950s; 1960s; 1970s; 1980s
- See also: Other events of 1961; List of years in Libya

The following lists events that happened in 1961 in Libya.

== Incumbents ==
- Monarch: Idris
- Prime Minister: Muhammad Osman Said

== Births ==
- Abdulbari Al Arusi

== Deaths ==
- Ahmed Rafiq Almhadoui
