= 1953 in Libya =

- Decades: 1930s; 1940s; 1950s; 1960s; 1970s
- See also: Other events of 1953; List of years in Libya

The following lists events that happened in 1953 in Libya.

== Incumbents ==
- Monarch: Idris
- Prime Minister: Mahmud al-Muntasir

== Sports ==
- 3 August - Libya national football team played its first official international match.
