= Jan Staller =

American photographer

- Born: 1952 (age 73–74); Mineoloa, New York, U.S.
- Occupation: Photographer
- Known for: Mixed Media Art
- Website: janstaller.net

Jan Staller is an American photographer who captures imagery of urban landscapes that focus on patterns of highway graveyards, unfinished buildings, and ongoing construction sites.

== Biography ==
Jan Staller's photographs focus on both the built world and the expressivity of the photographic medium.

For more than 35 years, Staller's photography has traced a trajectory from uncanny urban landscapes to bold abstracted studies of industrial materials. Moving to Manhattan in 1976, Staller began to photograph the world closest to his home: the West Side Highway. It was there Staller, working with a mixture of natural and artificial light, Staller made his influential twilight images of New York City. Over the years, he has expanded the regions of his work. In 1980, he photographed in Europe. By the mid 1980s Staller began photographing in New Jersey. During this time, he developed his technique of using powerful stadium lighting to illuminate the landscape. Staller also took more distant photo trips: around United States in 1989, 2001, 2004; Asia in 1996, 1998, 1999, 2004. Despite the potentially exotic subject matter to be found in distant lands Staller's travel photographs were remarkably consistent with the work he made closer to home.

In the mid 1990s Staller's work began to change as more of his photographs were made with natural lighting. Today most of his work is done on road trips to New Jersey. Where most photographers’ trips are long journeys in search of the unusual, Staller's trips are more local- miles spent canvassing the same general territory year after year in search of the familiar.

Staller attended Bard College at Simon's Rock liberal arts college, Great Barrington, MA, where he obtained his Associate of Arts degree in 1971. He went on to attend Maryland Institute, Baltimore, MD and obtained his Bachelor of Fine Arts degree in 1975.

== Beginning years of career ==
Night photography discusses Jan Staller's early stages of his photography career, "Staller's twilight color photographs (1977-84) of abandoned and derelict parts of New York City captured visions of the urban landscape lit by the sodium vapor street lights."

Jan Staller feels a connection to unusual landscapes that portray side-of-the-road objects. He published his first book in 1988 "Frontier New York", which focused on much of the desolate stretch of West Side Highway that ran along the Hudson River.

== Bibliography ==
- Frontier New York (1988), ISBN 978-1-55595-010-1
- On Planet Earth: Travels in an Unfamiliar Land (1997), ISBN 0893817309
