= 1952 in Libya =

- Decades: 1930s; 1940s; 1950s; 1960s; 1970s
- See also: Other events of 1952; List of years in Libya

The following lists events that happened in 1952 in Libya.

== Incumbents ==
- Monarch: Idris
- Prime Minister: Mahmud al-Muntasir

== Births ==
- 28 May - Mahmoud Jibril
