= 1964 in Libya =

- Decades: 1940s; 1950s; 1960s; 1970s; 1980s
- See also: Other events of 1964; List of years in Libya

The following lists events that happened in 1964 in Libya.

== Incumbents ==
- Monarch: Idris
- Prime Minister: Mohieddin Fikini (until January 20), Mahmud al-Muntasir (starting January 20)

== Events ==
- Libyan general election, 1964
