= 1956 in Libya =

- Decades: 1930s; 1940s; 1950s; 1960s; 1970s
- See also: Other events of 1956; List of years in Libya

The following lists events that happened in 1956 in Libya.

== Incumbents ==
- Monarch: Idris
- Prime Minister: Mustafa Ben Halim
