= 1951 in Libya =

- Decades: 1930s; 1940s; 1950s; 1960s; 1970s
- See also: Other events of 1951; List of years in Libya

The following lists events that happened during 1951 in Libya.

== Incumbents ==
- Monarch: Idris (starting December 24)
- Prime Minister: Mahmud al-Muntasir (starting March 29)

== Events ==
=== December ===
- December 24 - Libya becomes independent from Italy. This also comes with the establishment of Libyan Army.

== Bibliography ==
- Joseph Wechsberg (10 November 1951). "Letter from Libya". The New Yorker. USA.
