= Sunny 16 rule =

Method of estimating exposure in photography

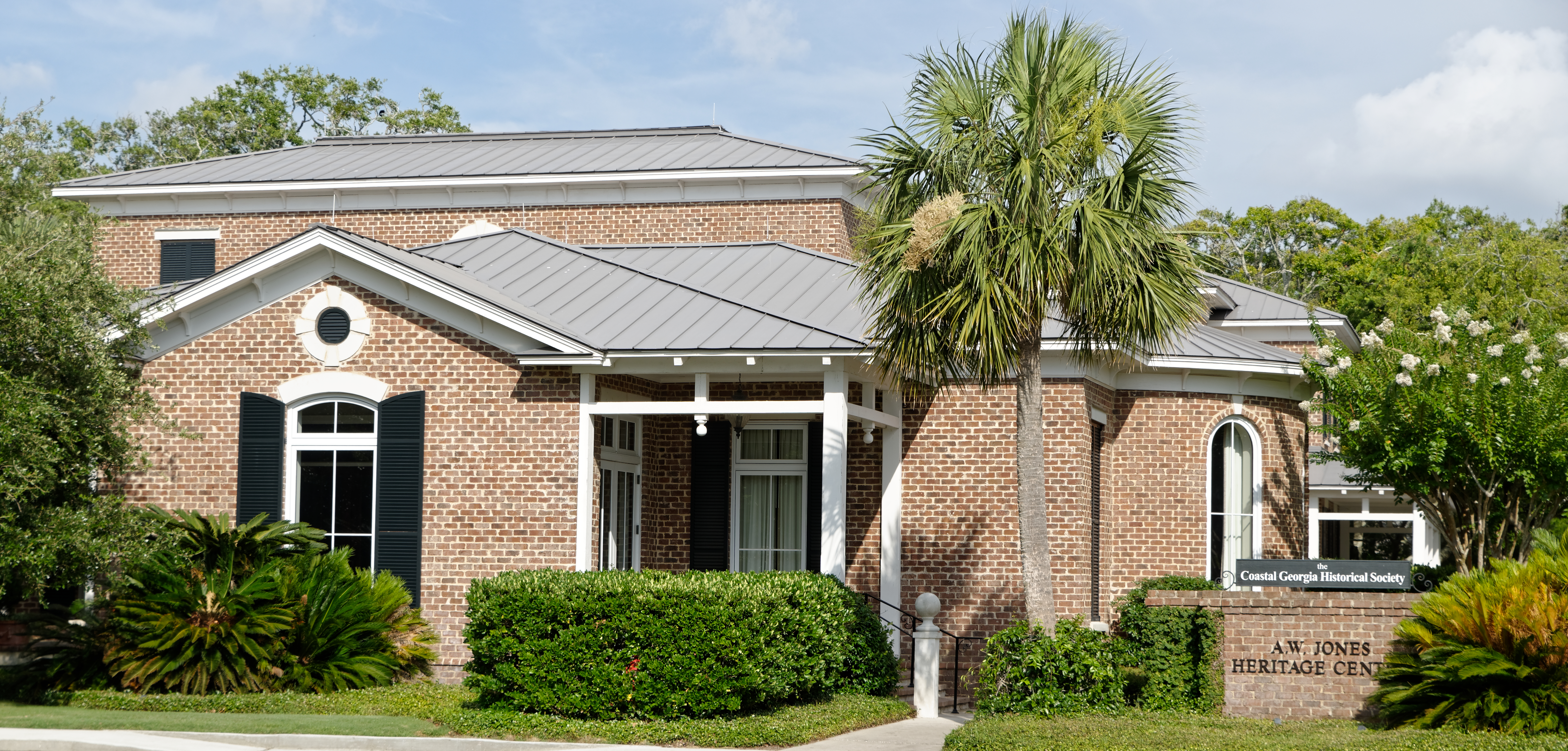
Sunlit subject shot on a digital camera set to ISO 100, exposed at f/8 at 1/400 second which is the same exposure value as f/16 for 1/100 second, the recommended "sunny 16" exposure

In photography, the sunny 16 rule (also known as the sunny f/16 rule) is a method of estimating correct daylight exposures without a light meter. Apart from the advantage of independence from a light meter, the sunny 16 rule can also aid in achieving correct exposure of difficult subjects. As the rule is based on incident light, rather than reflected light as with most camera light meters, very bright or very dark subjects are compensated for. The rule serves as a mnemonic for the camera settings obtained on a sunny day using the exposure value (EV) system.

== Using the rule ==
The basic rule is, "On a sunny day set aperture to f/16 and shutter speed to the [reciprocal of the] ISO film speed [or ISO setting] for a subject in direct sunlight." In simplest terms, bright sun = f:16 @ 1/film-speed-number (aperture and shutter speed, respectively).

For example:

- On a sunny day at ISO 100 ("100 speed film"), the aperture is set to f/16 and the shutter speed (i.e. exposure time) to 1/100 or 1/125 seconds (on some cameras 1/125 second is the closest available setting to 1/100 second).
- On a sunny day at ISO 200 and aperture at f/16, set shutter speed to 1/200 or 1/250.
- On a sunny day at ISO 400 and aperture at f/16, set shutter speed to 1/400 or 1/500.

Shutter speeds can be changed as long as the f-number is adjusted accordingly, e.g. 1/250 second at f/11 gives equivalent exposure to 1/125 second at f/16. Exposure adjustments are done in a manner that retains the EV. As the aperture is opened (f:11, f:8, f:5.6, f:4, etc.) the shutter-speed/exposure-time is reduced by a factor of approximately one-half (1/250, 1/500, 1/1000, etc.) This follows the mathematical relationship between aperture and shutter speed where exposure is inversely proportional to the square of the aperture ratio and proportional to exposure time; thus, to maintain a constant level of exposure, a change in aperture by a factor c requires a change in exposure time by a factor 1/c^{2} and vice versa. A change in the aperture of 1 stop always corresponds to a factor close to square root of 2, thus the above rule.

== Alternative rule ==
The sunny 16 rule can be used in varying light by setting the shutter speed nearest to the ISO film speed and f-number according to a generalized exposure table, as:

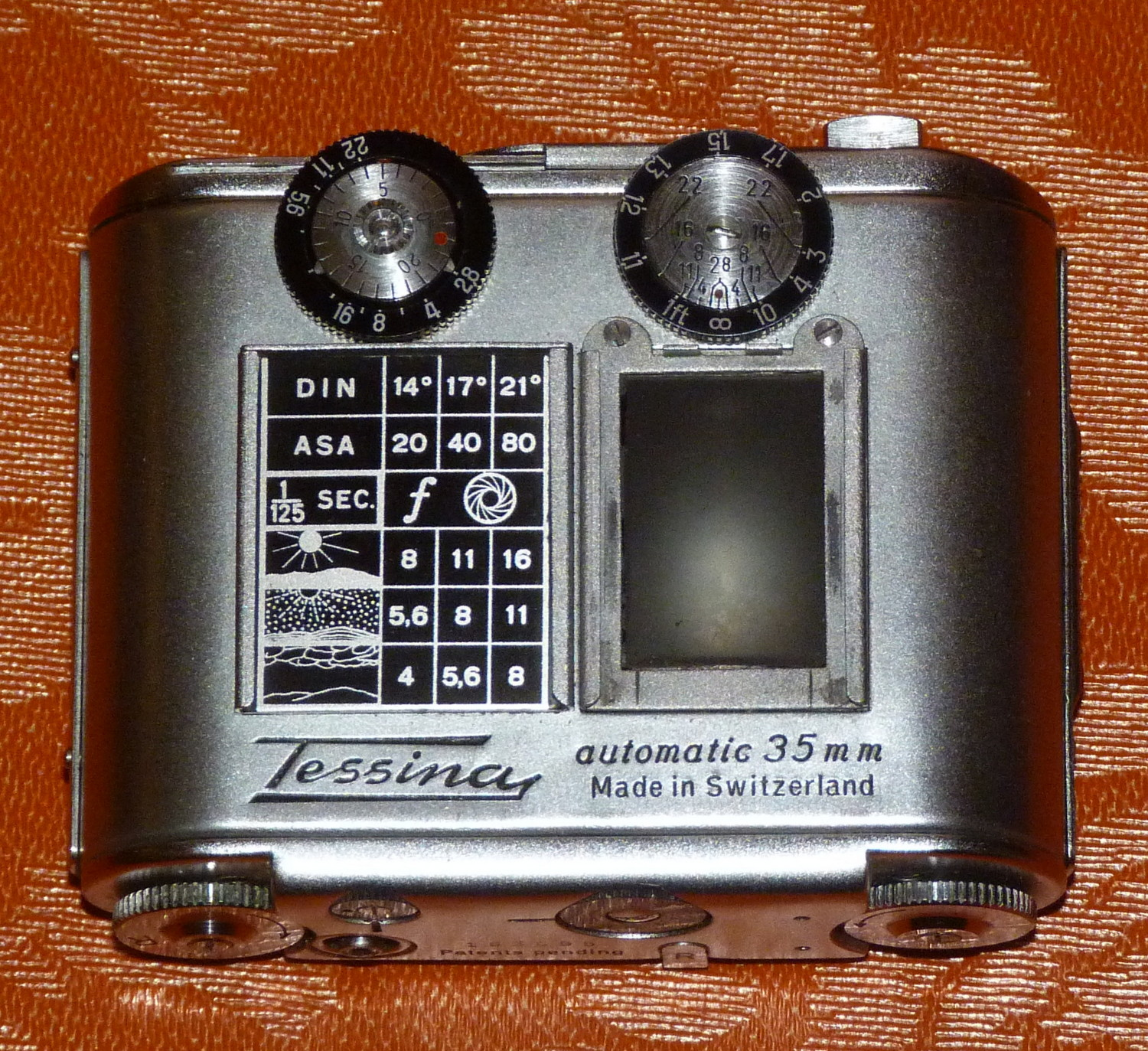
Tessina with exposure guide plate from the 1960s. At that time, DIN 21 was equivalent to ASA 80. After 1983, DIN 21 was ASA 100. On this guide plate, DIN 21 uses f/16 and 1/125, consistent with Sunny 16.

Aperture	Lighting conditions	Shadow detail
f/22	Snow/sand	Dark with sharp edges
f/16	Sunny	Distinct
f/11	Slight overcast	Soft around edges
f/8	Overcast	Barely visible
f/5.6	Heavy overcast	No shadows
f/4	Open shade/sunset	No shadows
Add one stop	Backlighting	n/a

Film manufacturers' daylight exposure tables follow the same pattern. Kodak's data sheet for its ISO 400 Tri-X film, for example, gives 1/500 second at f/16 for bright or hazy sun with distinct shadows, f/22 for bright or hazy sun on light sand or snow, f/11 for weak, hazy sun with soft shadows, f/8 for cloudy bright light with no shadows, and f/5.6 for heavy overcast or open shade, meaning a subject shaded from the sun but lit by a large area of clear sky. For backlit close-up subjects it recommends f/8 at 1/500 second, two stops more exposure than for a sunlit subject with distinct shadows.

== See also ==
- Looney 11 rule
