= Fortia SP =

- Maker: Fujifilm
- Speed: ISO 50/18°
- Type: Color slide
- Balance: Daylight
- Process: E-6
- Format: 35 mm, 120
- Saturation: Very high

Fujichrome Fortia SP was a brand of ISO 50 daylight-balanced professional color reversal film produced by the Japanese company Fujifilm between 2005 and 2007. It was an ultra-high saturation slide film with limited release in Japan only. Fortia SP was the successor of the original Fujichrome Fortia professional ISO 50 color reversal film, which was released in a limited run in 2004.

== See also ==
- Velvia
- Provia
- Astia
- Sensia
