= 1963–64 Libyan Premier League =

Libyan Premier League
- Season: 1963–64

The 1963–64 Libyan Premier League was the first edition of the competition, the first football competition at national level. The recently founded Libyan Football Federation organised the competition.

Prior to this, competitive football in Libya was played at regional level (since 1918). There were three Provincial Championships, Western, Eastern and Southern. The regional champions at the time came together to contest the first national title. They were:

- Ahly Benghazi (1962–63 Eastern Champions)
- Ahly Tripoli (1962–63 Western Champions)
- Hilal Sebha (1962–63 Southern Champions)

Hilal Sebha withdrew from the competition due to lack of resources, meaning that Ahly Benghazi and Ahly Tripoli faced a two-legged playoff tie, the winners of which would be crowned Libyan Premier League champions for the 1963–64 season.

October 23, 1964

Ahly Benghazi	0 – 1	Ahly Tripoli

Benghazi

December 4, 1964

Ahly Tripoli	1 – 0	Ahly Benghazi

Tripoli

Ahly Tripoli win the Libyan Premier League with a 2–0 aggregate scoreline.
