= Ahmed Rafiq Almhadoui =

Libyan poet (1898–1961)

- احمد رفيق المهدوي
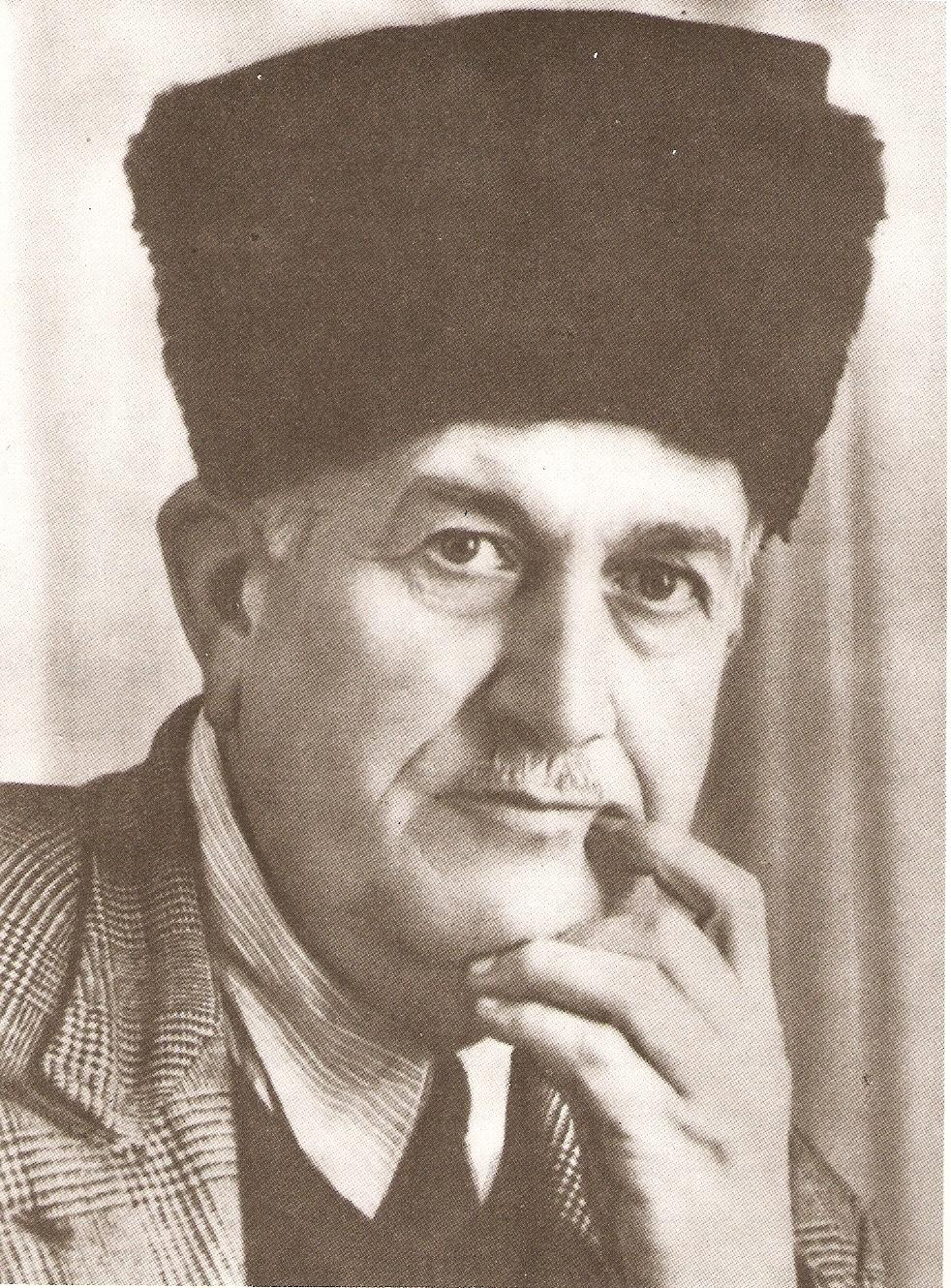
- Photo of Rafiq
- Born: January 1898; Fassāṭo, Libya
- Died: July 6, 1961 (aged 63); Athens, Greece
- Other names: Poet of the Nation; Poet of Patriotism
- Known for: Poetry, Activism
- Movement: Libyan resistance movement

Ahmed Rafiq al-Mahdawi (Arabic: احمد رفيق المهدوي 1898–1961) was a Libyan poet. Al-Mahdawi was born in 1898 in the village of Fassāṭo, now Jadu, in Libya's Nafusa Mountains.

== Early life ==
At the age of 13, Rafiq migrated to Egypt where he studied and achieved an elementary certificate in the Arabic language and General Certificate of Education. Before he was able to take his baccalaureate exam, he was forced to return to Benghazi, Libya in 1920.

== Career ==
When Rafiq returned to Libya in 1920, he worked there as a secretary of the Benghazi Council, but the Italian Fascists, who were angered at his poetry, dismissed him from the position. He fled to Turkey in 1925, where his father and oldest brother lived, and resided there for almost a decade. In 1934, he returned to Benghazi only to, once again, be exiled in 1936 due to his poetry, in which he expressed nationalist, anti-Italian occupation sentiment. He opted to return to Turkey, where he lived during the entirety of World War 2, even becoming a civil officer. Rafiq returned to his home in 1946, where he vocally criticized the British Administration. He used his poetry to participate in the national movement which led to the independence of Libya on 24 December 1952, after which he was appointed to be a member of the first Libyan Senate. Major events in Libya, Egypt, Palestine and Tunisia are covered in his poetry.The guru of Arab authors "Al-‘Aqqād" called him the leader of poetry renovation. He died in 1961 in Libya. His most famous poem is "To Italy", written after the defeat of the Axis countries in 1945.

== Bibliography ==
- Ghaith al-Saghir (1934)
- Rhyme and Metre in Arabic Poetry (1936)
- To Italy (1945)
