= 1962–63 Libyan Eastern Championship =

The 1962-63 Libyan Eastern Championship was a Libyan football championship that took place to decide who would represent the East at national level for the 1963-64 Libyan Premier League. The league was made up of eight teams, who played each other twice (14 games in total):

From Benghazi:

- Ahly
- Hilal
- Najma
- Nasr
- Tahaddi

From Derna:

- Ittihad Darnah
- Darnes

From Tobruk:

- Tobruk

== League table ==
Pos	Team	Pld	W	D	L	GF	GA	GD	Pts	Qualification
1	Ahly	14	10	3	1	39	17	+22	23	1963–64 Libyan Premier League
2	Hilal	14	10	2	2	38	14	+24	22	
3	Najma	14	7	0	7	32	24	+8	14	
4	Ittihad Darnah	14	5	3	6	14	25	−11	13	
5	Darnes	14	4	2	8	21	30	−9	10	
6	Nasr	14	4	2	8	21	31	−10	10	
7	Tahaddi	14	3	4	7	15	25	−10	10	
8	Tobruk	14	3	4	7	21	35	−14	10	

== Results ==
Home \ Away	AFQ	AHLB	DRN	HIL	NAJ	NSR	SQR	THD
Afriqi		2–2	1–2	0–3	2–0	0–0	3–1	1–0
Ahly Benghazi	3–0		6–1	2–1	2–1	4–2	9–0	2–1
Darnes	1–0	3–1		1–2	1–3	4–0	3–3	1–1
Hilal	5–1	1–1	5–1		2–1	3–1	2–1	5–0
Najma	5–1	3–2	3–0	2–1		4–3	5–1	2–1
Nasr	1–1	0–2	2–3	0–2	3–2		2–0	4–0
Suqoor	1–2	1–2	1–0	3–3	2–1	4–0		1–1
Tahaddy	1–0	1–1	2–0	0–3	3–0	2–3	2–2	

Updated to match(es) played on unknown. Source: kooora.com
Legend: Blue = home team win; Yellow = draw; Red = away team win.
