= Provia =

Fujifilm photographic films

Fujichrome Provia 100F [RDP III]
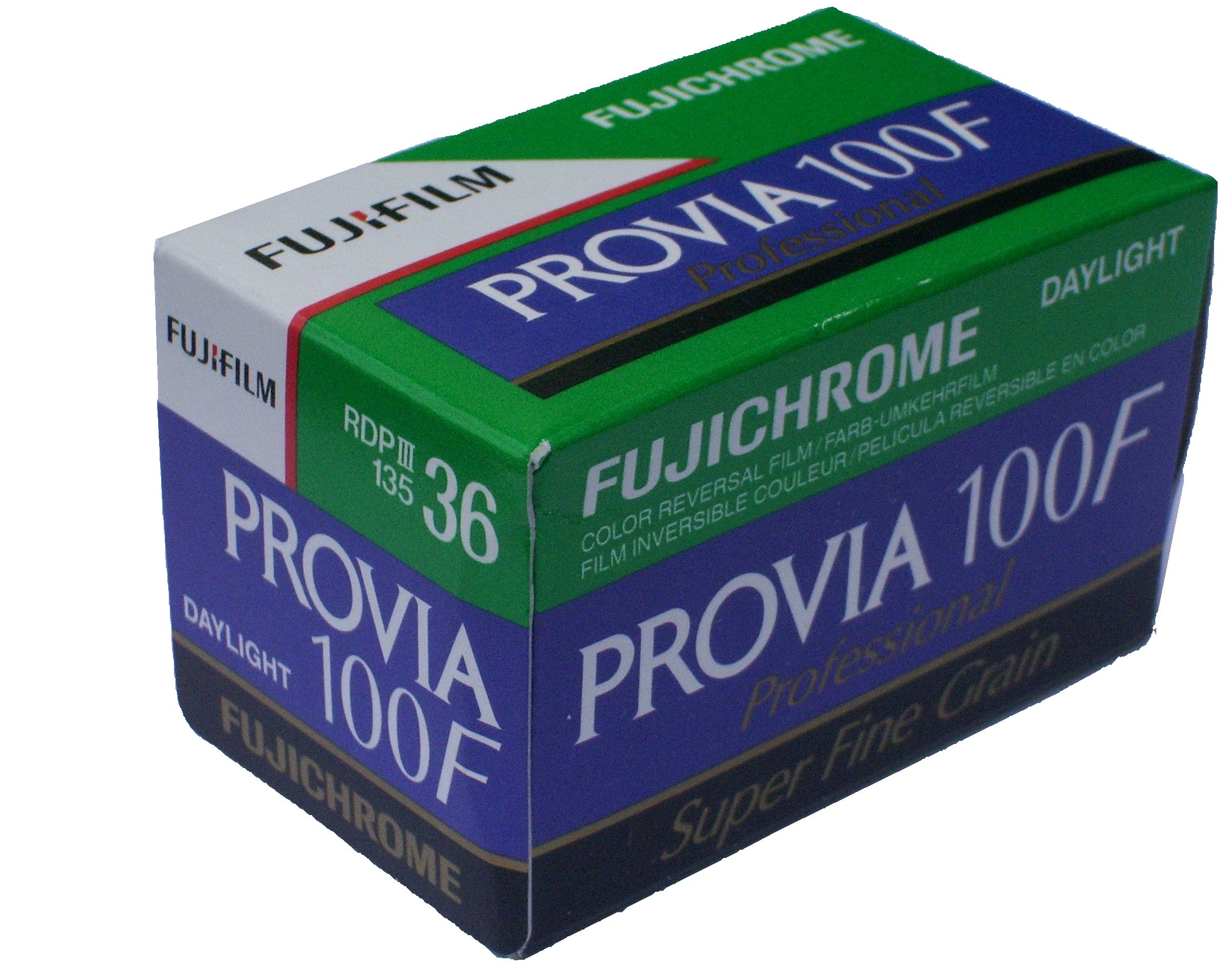
- Maker: Fujifilm
- Speed: ISO 100/21°
- Type: Color slide
- Balance: Daylight
- Process: E-6 process
- Format: 35mm, 120, 220, 4×5 in, 8×10 in, 11×14 in
- Grain: RMS 8
- Exposure latitude: ±½
- Saturation: high

Fujichrome Provia 400X [RXP]
- Maker: Fujifilm
- Speed: ISO 400/27°
- Push: EI 280/25.5° to EI 1600/33°
- Type: Color slide
- Balance: Daylight
- Process: E-6 process
- Format: 35mm, 120
- Grain: RMS 11
- Discontinued: 2013

Provia is a brand name for a pair of daylight-balanced color reversal films (slide film) produced by the Japanese film company Fujifilm. It is currently available in one speed, 100/21°, marketed as Fujichrome Provia 100F Professional [RDP III],. An additional speed of 400/27°, marketed as Fujichrome Provia 400X Professional [RXP], was previously available.

== Details ==
Provia 100F [RDP III] was developed to replace Provia 100 [RDP II] and Provia 400X [RXP] was developed to replace Provia 400F [RHP III], improving on color image storage permanence and color fading resistance. Provia has less saturated colors and contrast compared to Velvia.

Provia 100F [RDP III] is available in 135 and 120 formats, as well as in various sheet sizes. Provia 400X was only available in 135 and 120 formats prior to discontinuation.

Both films have the ability to be pushed/pulled from −1/2 stop to +2 stops. Provia is also a favored film for cross processing.

Neither film requires reciprocity compensation between 1/4000 sec and one minute, with Provia 100F [RDP III] able to last up to two minutes. These longer times make the films particularly suitable for multiple exposures.

Provia 400X [RXP] used what Fuji film described as Epitaxial Sigma Crystal (ESC) technology to achieve a granularity of RMS11.

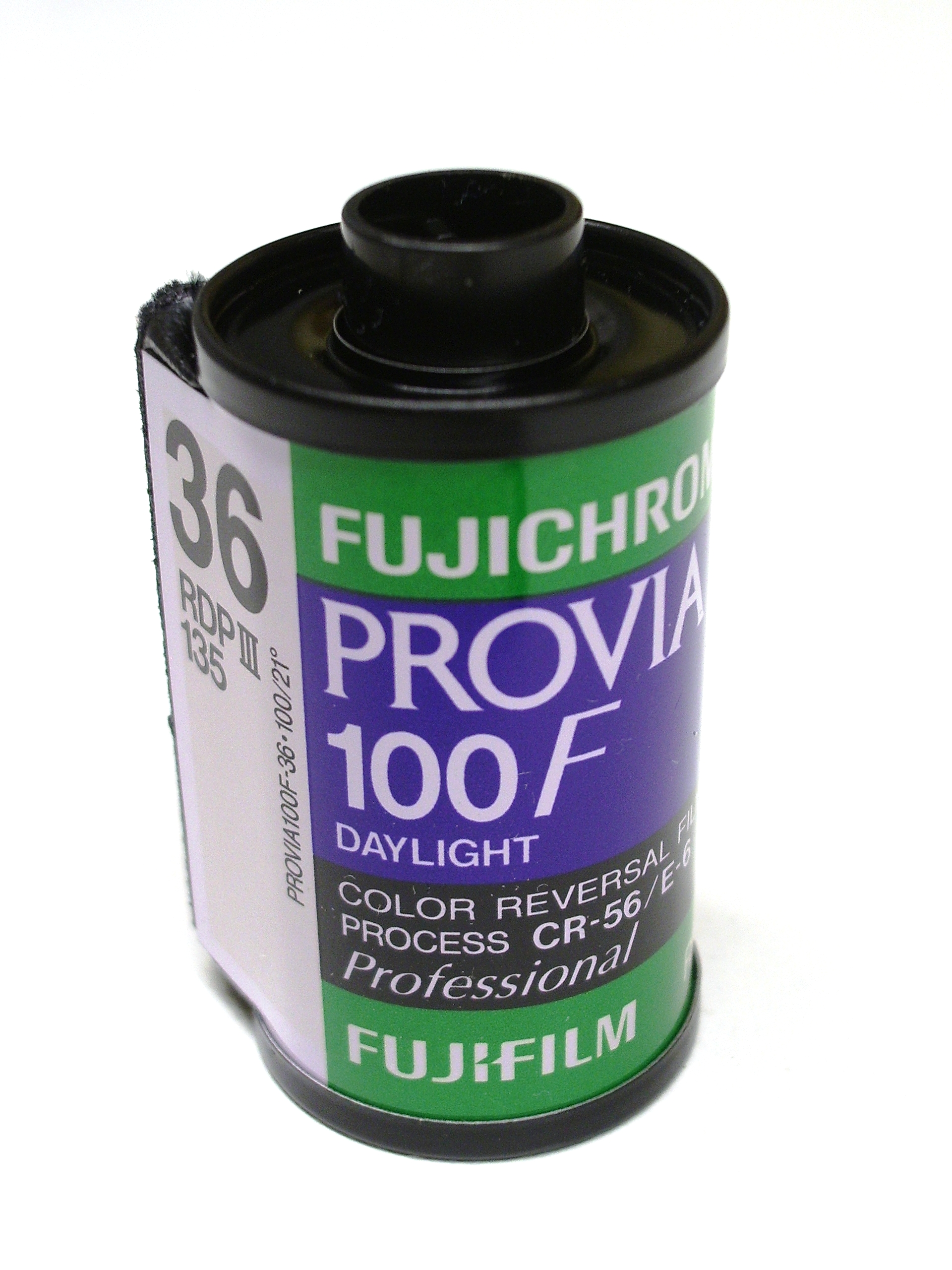
Provia 100F [RDP III] roll.

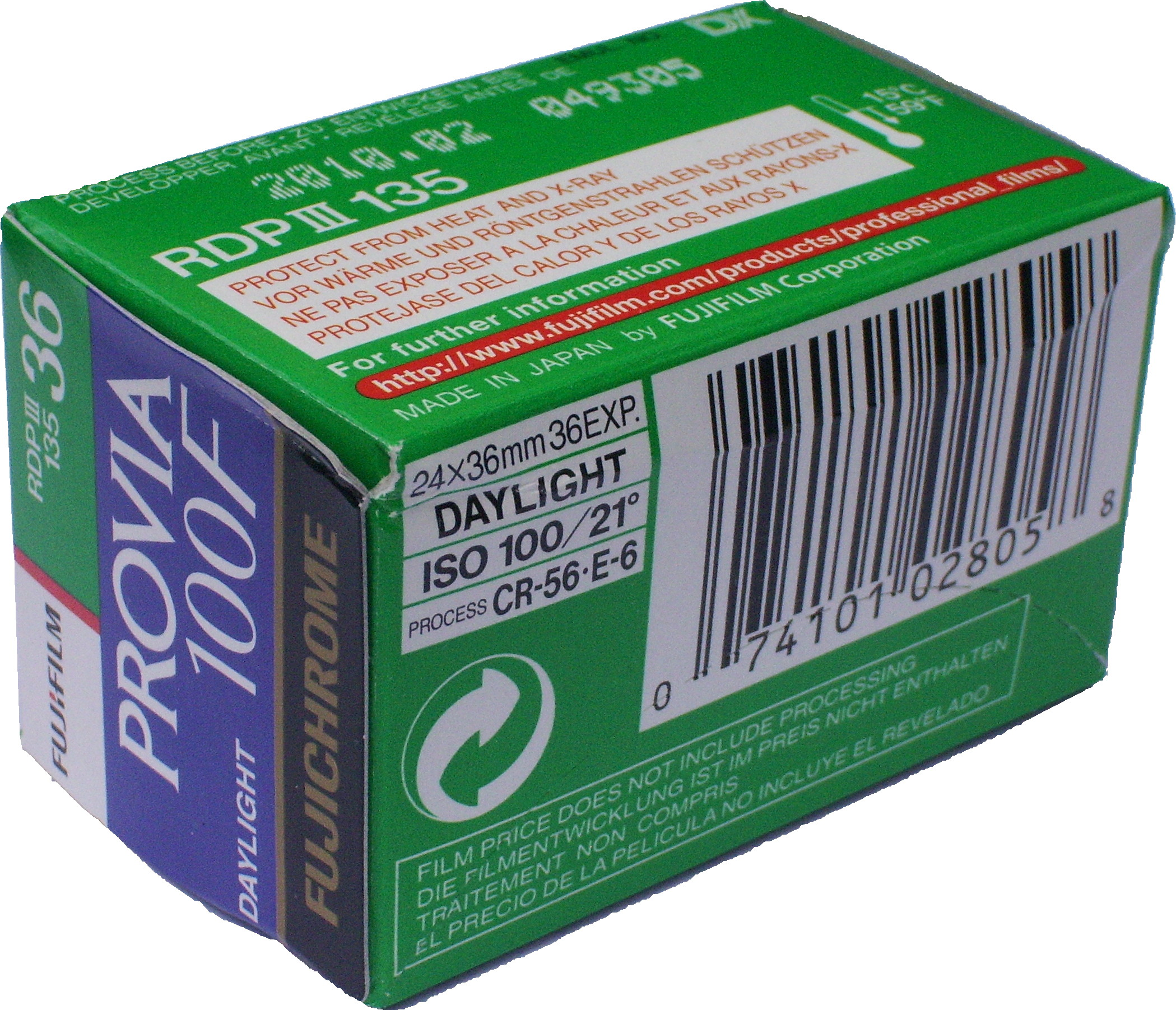
Back of Provia 100F [RDP III] box.

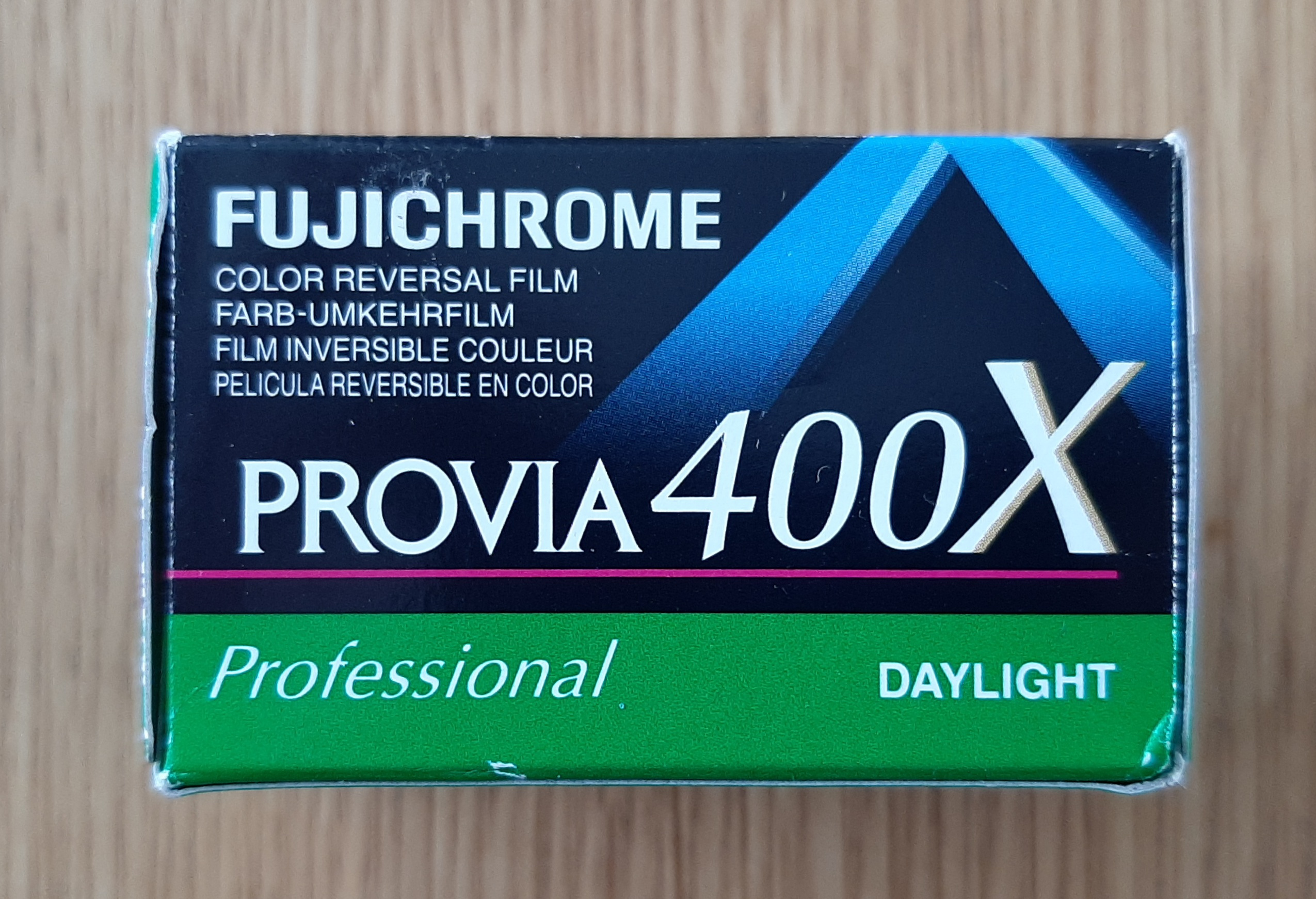
Box of Provia 400X film

== See also ==
- Sensia
- Astia
- Velvia
- Fortia
- List of photographic films
