= Suleiman Fortia =

Suleiman Al-Fortia (Arabic: سليمان الفورتية born march 1954) is a member of the Libyan National Transitional Council representing the city of Misrata. Fortia received his undergraduate degree from the University of Tripoli and a Doctor of Engineering in architecture from a British university. He has taught at King Faisal University for eight years. He has participated in delegations to France during talks where the anti-Gaddafi forces asked for weapons shipments. He also negotiated in person for aid efforts to help Misrata during the siege of Misrata.
