= Velvia =

Brand of daylight-balanced color reversal film

Velvia RVP
- Maker: Fujifilm
- Speed: ISO 50/18°
- Type: Color slide
- Balance: Daylight
- Process: E-6
- Format: 35mm, 120, 220, 4×5 in, 8×10 in, 13×18 cm, Super 8^{†}, 16mm^{†}^{†}Third party
- Grain: RMS 9
- Exposure latitude: ±½ stop
- Saturation: very high
- Application: Nature
- Introduced: 1990
- Discontinued: 2005

Velvia 50 (Velvia II) RVP50
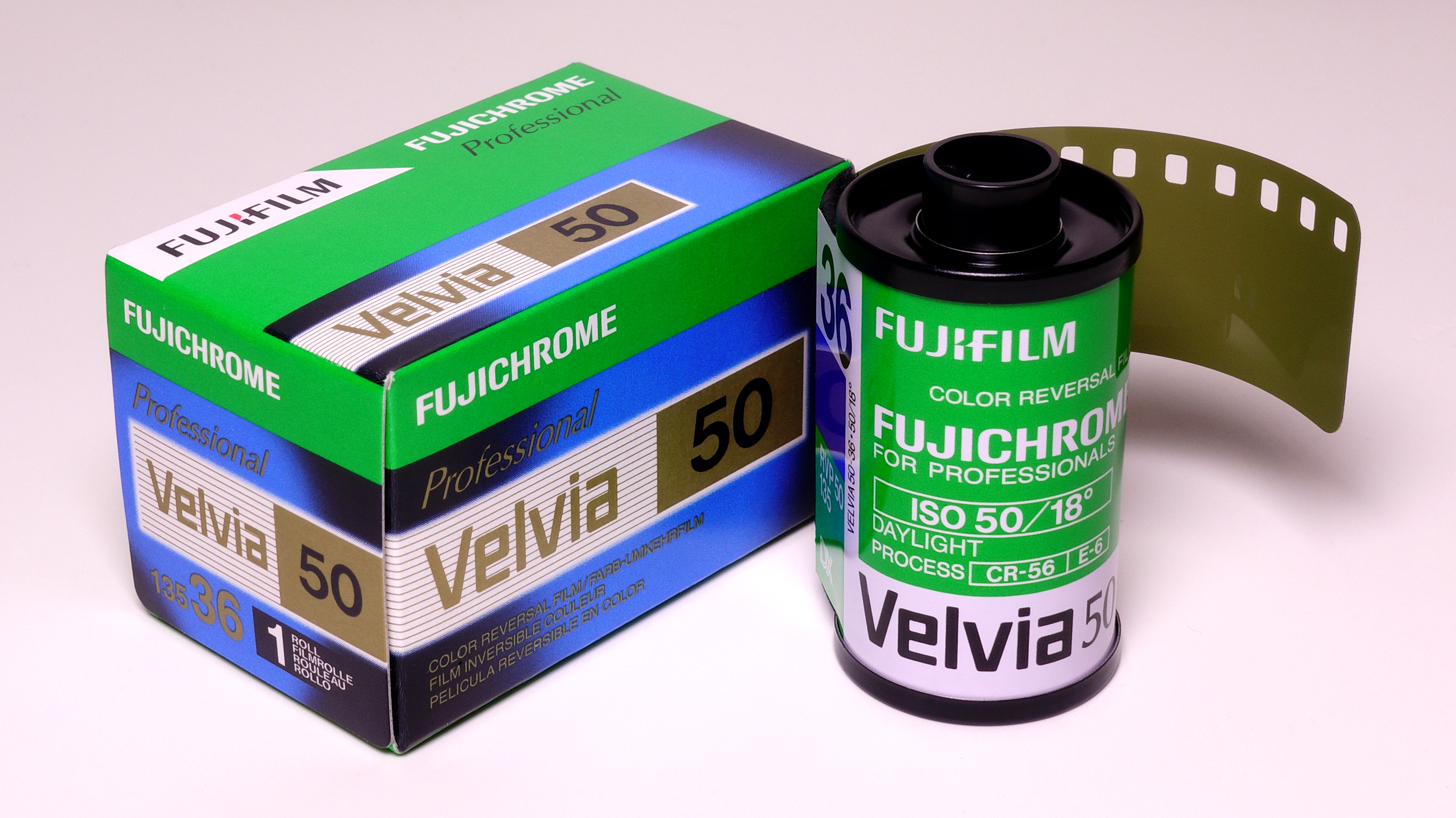
- Maker: Fujifilm
- Speed: ISO 50/18°
- Type: Color slide
- Balance: Daylight
- Process: E-6
- Format: 35mm, 120, 220^{*}, 4×5 in, 8×10 in^{*}, QuickLoad 4×5 in^{*}^{*}Discontinued
- Grain: RMS 9
- Exposure latitude: ±½ stop
- Saturation: very high
- Application: Nature
- Introduced: 2007

Velvia 100 RVP 100
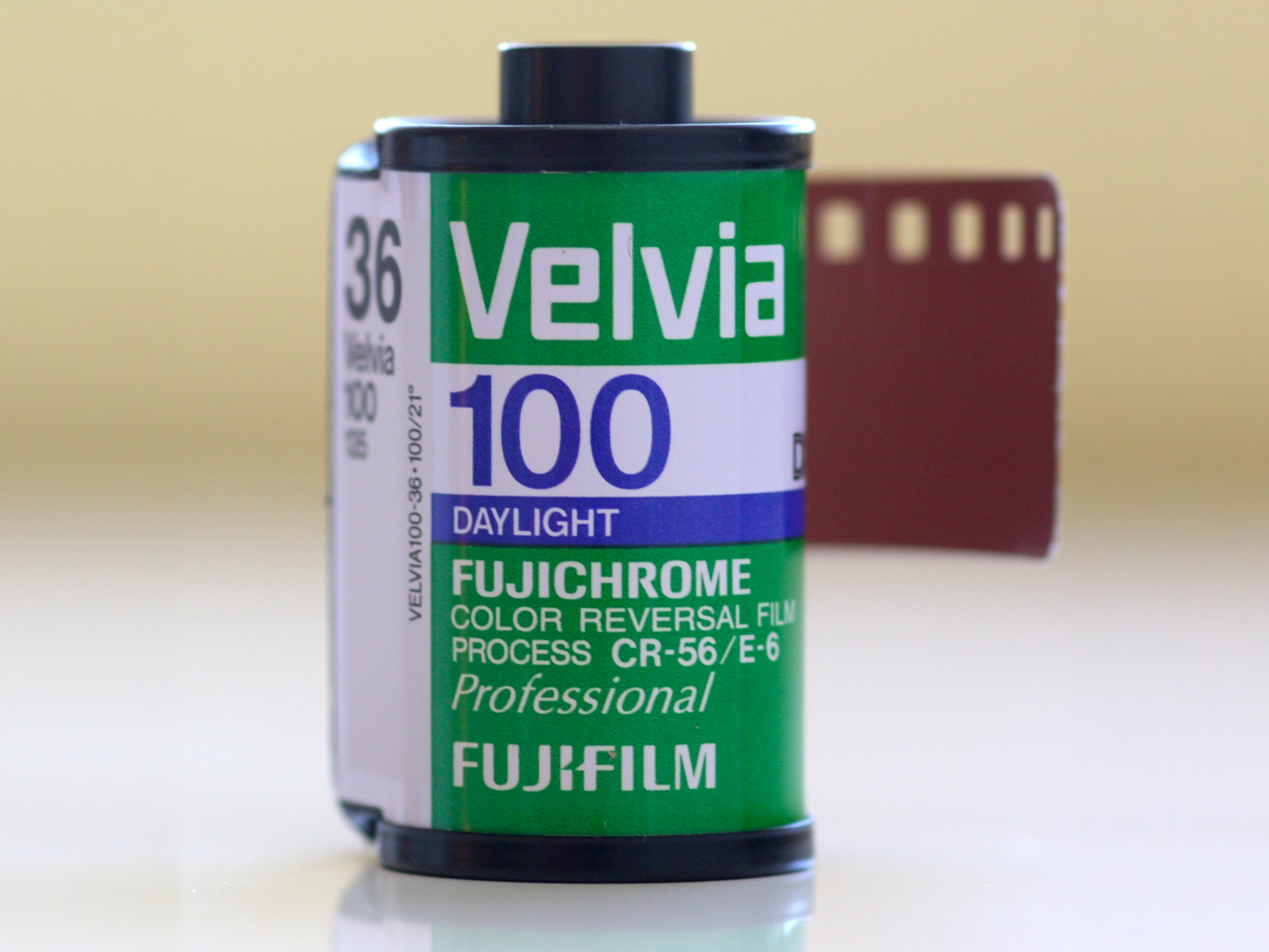
- Fuji Velvia 100 film cartridge
- Speed: ISO 100/21°
- Type: Color
- Format: 35mm, 120, 220, 4×5 in, 8×10 in
- Grain: RMS 8
- Exposure latitude: ±½ stop
- Saturation: very high
- Application: Nature
- Introduced: 2005

Velvia 100F RVP 100F
- Speed: ISO 100/21°
- Type: Color
- Format: 35mm, 120, 220, 4×5 in, 8×10 in, 9×12 cm, 13×18 cm
- Grain: RMS 8
- Exposure latitude: ±½ stop
- Saturation: high
- Application: Nature
- Introduced: 2002
- Discontinued: 2012 (Eur. NOAM)

Velvia is a brand of daylight-balanced color reversal film produced by the Japanese company Fujifilm. The original version of the film was introduced in 1990 as "Velvia for Professionals" and given the classification code "RVP,” meaning "Reversal/Velvia/Professional series". It is known for its extremely high level of color saturation and image quality. It has brighter and generally more accurate color reproduction, finer grain, twice the speed, and a more convenient process (E-6), as compared to Kodachrome 25, which increasingly lost market share within the first few years after Velvia was introduced (in part because of Kodak's lack of interest in promoting their film); Kodachrome 64 and 200 followed more slowly. Kodachrome 25 had previously been considered the film to which all other slide films had been compared, and cannot fairly be compared to Velvia, as Kodachrome is an entirely different process (in which the image is produced with "color clouds" instead of traditional grain).

Velvia has the highest resolving power of any slide film. A 35 mm Velvia slide can resolve up to 160 lines per mm.

== Appearance ==
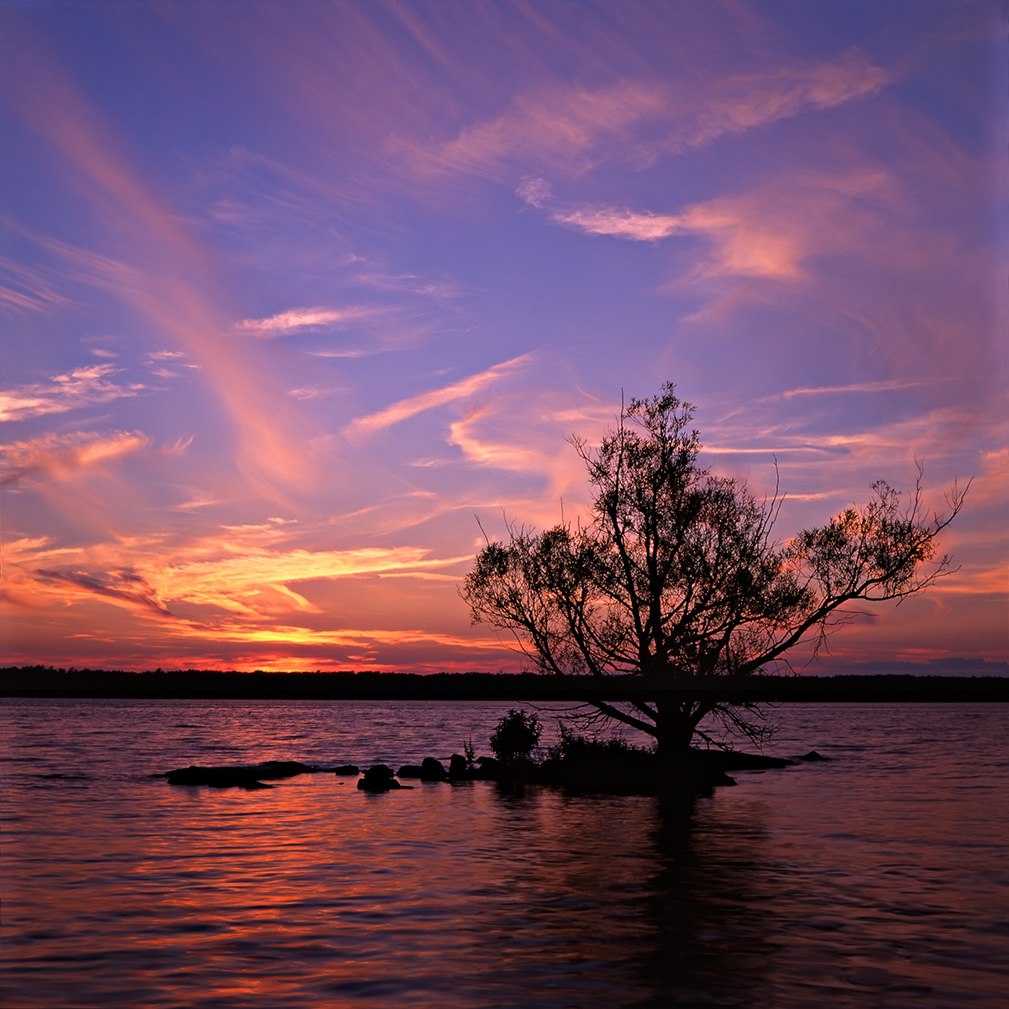
Sunset over the St. Lawrence River, shot on 6x6 cm Velvia 50

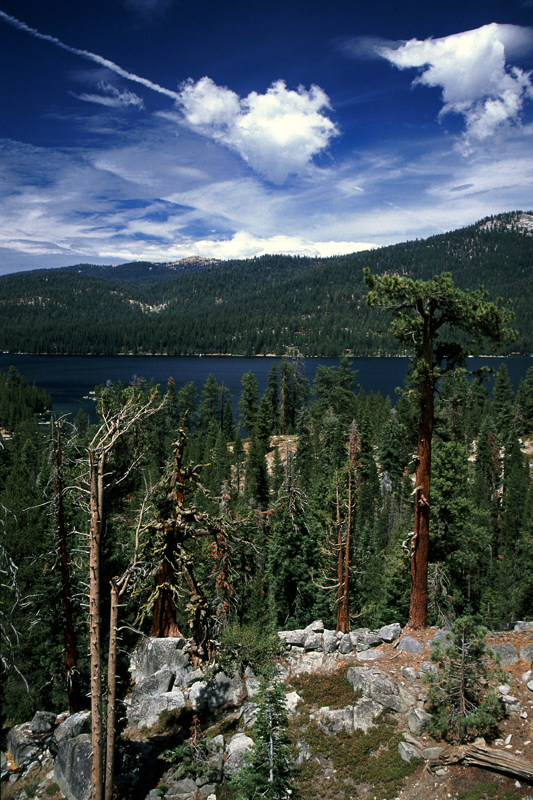
Huntington Lake, shot on 35mm Velvia 50

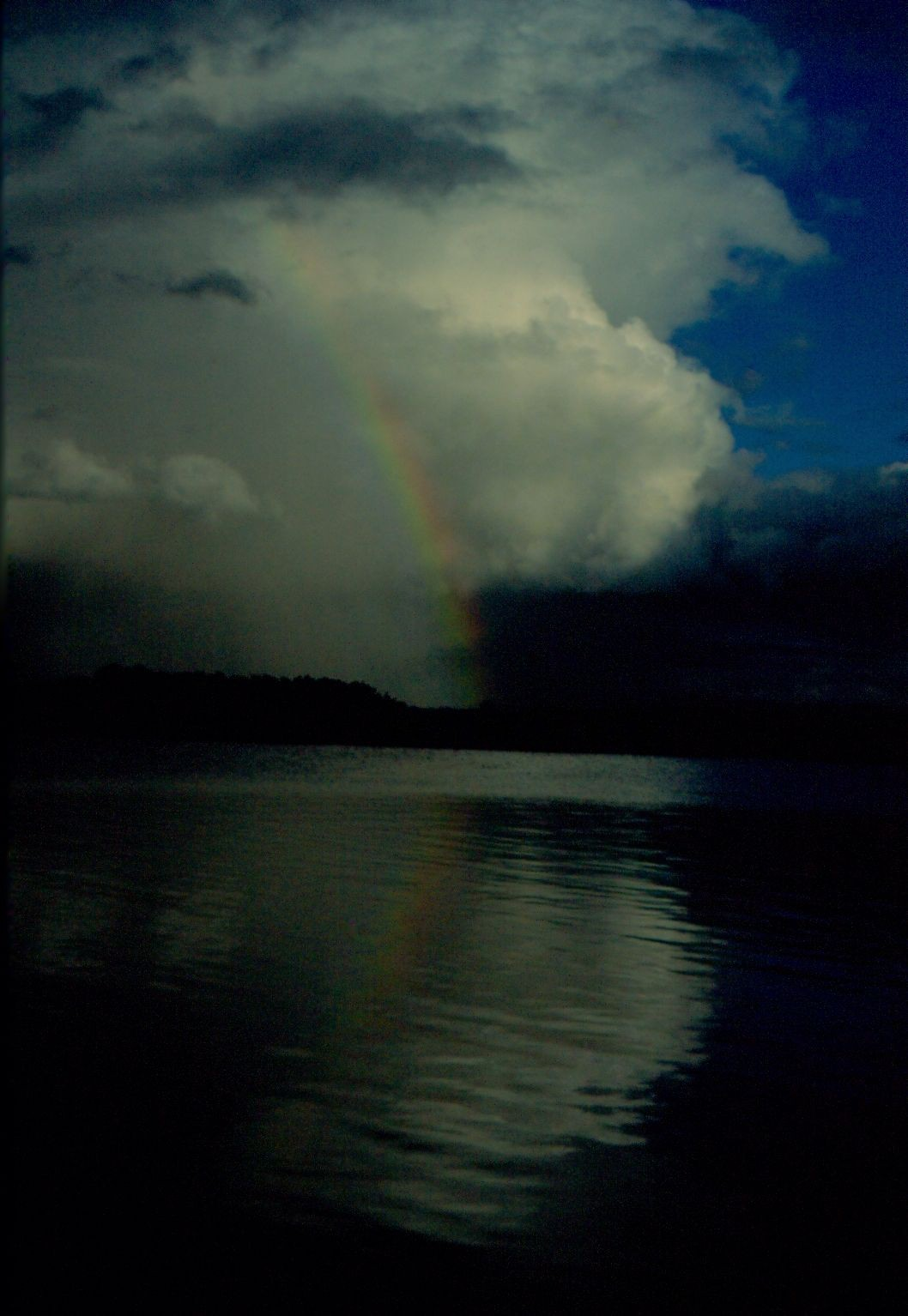
Rainbow over St. Lawrence, Akwesasne Mohawk Territory, 1992, Velvia 50 35mm slide

Velvia has very saturated colors under daylight, high contrast, and exceptional sharpness. These characteristics make it the slide film of choice for many nature photographers.

== Speeds ==
=== Original Velvia ===
The original Velvia was an ISO 50 film. In practice, many photographers used an exposure index (EI) of 40 or 32 to increase exposure slightly (one or two thirds of a stop respectively) in order to yield less saturated colors and more shadow detail. It was discontinued in 2005.

=== Velvia 50 ===
After being announced under the provisional name, ‘Velvia II,’ Velvia 50 (RVP50) was reintroduced, on a new film base, in 2007. The original Velvia had been discontinued because of difficulties in obtaining some of the raw materials needed to make the emulsion. Fuji R&D created a new emulsion which substituted different materials in its manufacture yet retained the appearance of the classic Velvia.

=== Velvia 100 ===
Velvia 100 was introduced in 2005, to replace the discontinued original Velvia. It is about as saturated as the original version but was designed to be more accurate in color reproduction. It used the new "Super-fine Sigma-crystal" technology which ended the need for larger grain size to achieve greater film speed. The newer speed also has finer grain (an RMS granularity value of 8), and uses the color correction layers found in Provia 100F. The Advanced DIR Technology releases developer inhibitors release compounds that regulate interlayer and edge effects yielding dramatic improvements in color reproduction. The color rendition of Velvia 100 was designed to record all colors even more accurately. Reciprocity failure was reduced for long exposures and dye stability extended. Fujichrome F transparency films held color accuracy for years of archival color stability, while Kodachrome films faded in less than 20 minutes of accrued projection.

On July 6, 2021, Fujifilm announced the discontinuation of Velvia 100 within the United States, effective immediately. The chemical phenol, isopropylated phosphate (3:1) (PIP (3:1)) (CASRN 68937-41-7), the use of which is banned under the EPA's Toxic Substances Control Act (TSCA), is present in minuscule quantities within the layers of the film. While Fujifilm believes the trace amount is not harmful to the environment, they opted to discontinue the film within the United States in compliance with the regulation. Their statement does not make it clear if the film will continue to be sold in other markets.

=== Velvia 100F ===
Velvia 100F offers saturated colors, better color fidelity and higher contrast. It was introduced in 2002. It was discontinued in 2012 in most formats and markets, and is now only sold as sheet film (4x5" and 8x10") exclusively in Japan. Velvia 100F is less saturated than RVP50 and is accurate in color rendition with the exception of yellow. It exaggerates this color, especially when there is a slight yellowish cast in the scene. On film, this will be a deeper and more noticeable yellow. Skin color was rendered better.

== Long exposure problems ==
The original Velvia suffered much more from reciprocity failure than most other films. Exposing the film for as little as 16 seconds produced a color shift, typically to purple or green, depending on shooting conditions. Anything over four seconds requires the use of magenta color correction filters if correct color balance is required, exposures of 64 seconds and longer are "not recommended" by Fuji.

Velvia 100 is much better with long exposures: no reciprocity failure compensation is required for exposures shorter than 1 minute.

== Velvia in cinematography ==
Velvia film stock was available through 2006 and was used for many commercials, but rarely for feature films. Its main use in movies was for shooting stock landscape shots and special-effects background plates. One example is the 1998 film What Dreams May Come, which took place largely within a painting. After being discontinued, the closest replacement for the original Velvia film stock was Eterna Vivid 160, which produced roughly the same color effect while being more easily processed. In 2013, Fujifilm ended production of all motion picture film.

Since 2006, Velvia 50 D (also sold as Cinevia) is available in Super 8 via three independent companies, Pro8mm in the US, and GK Film and Wittner Kinotechnik in Europe. Spectra Film and Video has also been loading Fuji Velvia into Super 8 cartridges and for 16 mm. They recently modified the Kodak-supplied cartridges to ensure a smoother transport of Velvia film through the cartridge.

== See also ==
- Fortia
- Astia
- Provia
- Sensia
