= National Centrist Party =

Political party in Libya

National Centrist Party التيار الوطني الوسطي
- Chairperson: Ali Tarhouni
- Founded: 23 November 2011; 13 years ago
- Headquarters: Tripoli, Libya
- Ideology: Libyan nationalism Islamic democracy Islamic liberalism
- Political position: Centre
- Religion: Sunni Islam
- National affiliation: National Forces Alliance
- Colours: Blue
- Seats in the General National Congress: 2 / 200

Website
- https://www.facebook.com/NCP.Libya/

National Centrist Party (Arabic: التيار الوطني الوسطي) is a parliamentary political party in Libya, launched by former interim oil minister, Ali Tarhouni, on 23 October 2011. It is a centrist political movement, with bases on democracy and religious moderation.

== Ideology ==
The NCP's self-reported doctrine is moderate. Ali Tarhouni, the founder and leader of the NCP, declared in an interview with Libya Herald: "Moderation is the name of our movement. We are moderate. We are in the middle. I think any radicalization of Islam is something that we oppose. We strongly oppose that. We grew up in this country and we basically don’t practice these things that they do and I hope that they stop because Libya does not really condone that."

== Election results ==
NCP competed in the Libyan General National Congress election, 2012. The party received 2 of the 80 party-list seats, and with others political parties is in minority.

== See also ==
- Justice and Construction Party (Libya)
- National Forces Alliance
