= Abdulrahman Ben Yezza =

Libyan businessman and politician

Abdulrahman Ben Yezza عبد الرحمن بن يزة

Minister of Oil
- Incumbent
- Assumed office 22 November 2011
- Prime Minister: Abdurrahim El-Keib
- Preceded by: Ali Tarhouni

Personal details
- Party: National Transitional Council
- Profession: Businessman

Abdulrahman Ben Yezza (Arabic: عبد الرحمن عبدالله بن يزة) is a Libyan businessman and politician who is the Oil Minister in the government of Abdurrahim El-Keib. Before the 2011 Libyan Civil War, Ben Yezza served as "chairman of the operator's management committee" for Italian oil company Eni. He also worked for Libya's National Oil Corporation during Libya's governance by Muammar Gaddafi, but he quit the company voluntarily due to reported differences with its then-leader Shokri Ghanem, a member of Gaddafi's inner circle. In 2014 the Libyan government has named Abdulrahman Ben Yezza as chairman of the Libyan Investment Authority (LIA). He temporarily replaced AmbdulMagid Breish who had to step out pending an investigation into his role in the Gaddafi administration.

Ben Yezza was originally considered for an appointment to government under the interim administration of Mahmoud Jibril, the National Transitional Council's prime minister during the fight to overthrow Gaddafi. Jibril's overt contemplation of naming Ben Yezza, who was ultimately passed over in favor of retaining Deputy Prime Minister Ali Tarhouni, to head the Oil Ministry was seen by some analysts as a gesture to the government of Italy, a major investor in Libyan oilfields and an important supporter of the Libyan civil war. Ben Yezza was ultimately given the portfolio of Oil Minister by Jibril's successor, Abdurrahim El-Keib, on 22 November 2011.
