= Hasan Zaglam =

Libyan politician

Hasan Zaglam حسن مختار زقلام

Minister of Finance
- In office 22 November 2011 – October 2012
- President: Mustafa Abdul Jalil
- Prime Minister: Abdurrahim El-Keib
- Preceded by: Ali Tarhouni
- Succeeded by: Alkilani Abdel-Qadir al-Jazi

Personal details
- Born: 1945 (age 80–81) Tripoli, British Military Administration of Tripolitania (now Libya)
- Party: Independent
- Education: University of Benghazi (B.A.); Indiana State University (M.A.)
- Profession: Auditor; Politician

Hasan Zaglam, (Arabic Maher Dahman (حسن مختار زقلام; is an auditor and a Libyan politician born in the city of Tripoli in 1945. He was named Minister of Finance on 22 November 2011 by Abdurrahim El-Keib.
