= Ashour Bin Khayal =

Libyan politician (born 1938)

Ashour Ben Khayal عاشور بن خيال
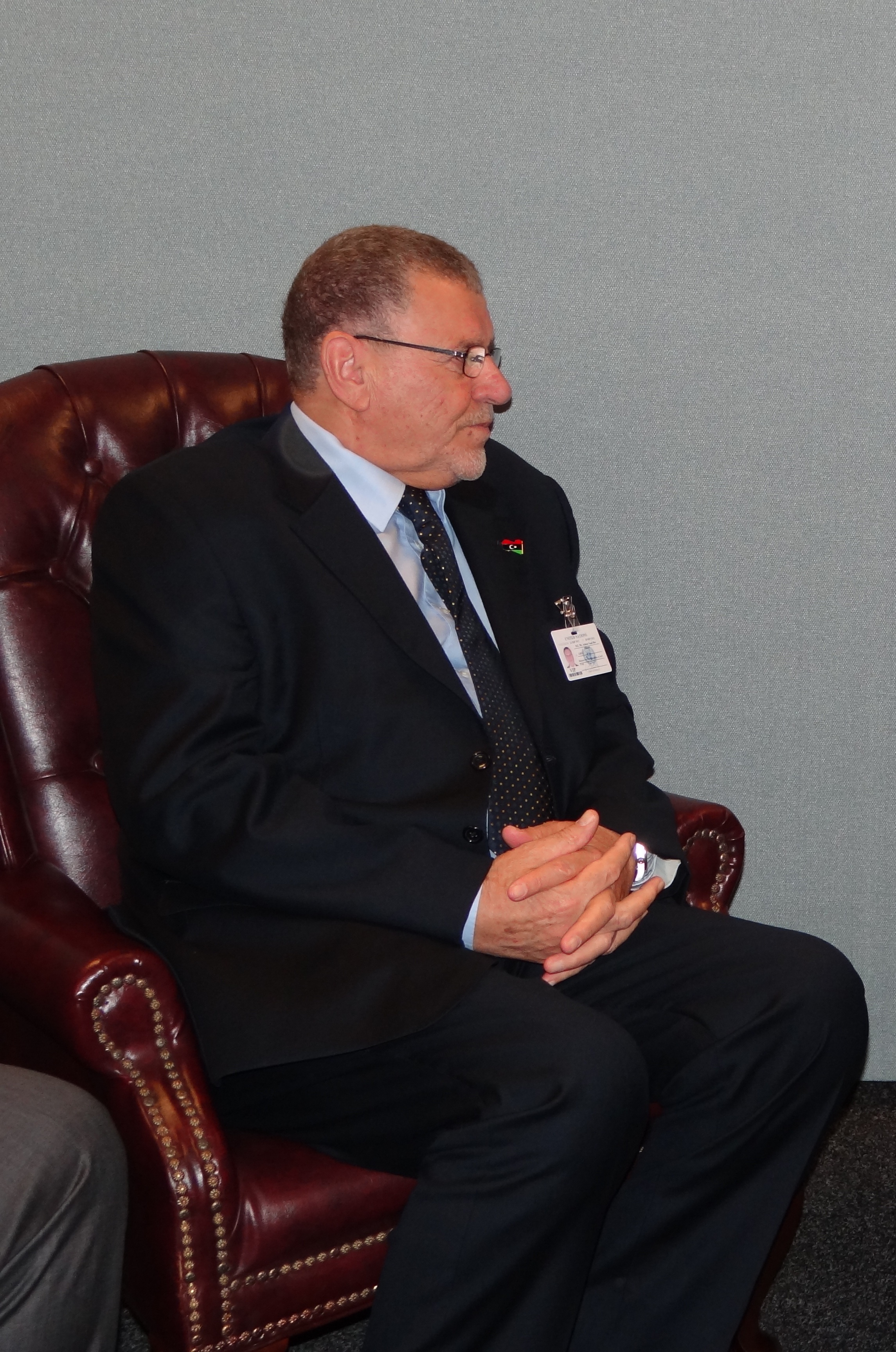
- Bin Khayal in 2012

Foreign Minister of Libya
- In office 22 November 2011 – 1 November 2012
- President: Mustafa Abdul Jalil; Mohamed Yousef el-Magariaf
- Prime Minister: Abdurrahim El-Keib
- Preceded by: Mahmoud Jibril
- Succeeded by: Ali Aujali

Personal details
- Born: September 1939 (age 86–87) Derna, Libya
- Party: Libyan National Movement
- Education: University of Libya (B.A.); Institute of Higher Education (M.A.)
- Profession: Diplomat

Ashour Ben Khayal (Arabic: عاشور بن خيال), sometimes romanised Ben Hayal, (born September 1939) is a Libyan diplomat and politician who was born in the Cyrenaican city of Derna in September 1939. He was named Foreign Minister on 22 November 2011 by Abdurrahim El-Keib in a surprise move, as the position was originally reported to be filled by Libya's deputy ambassador to United Nations Ibrahim Dabbashi. He was described as little-known prior to his appointment.

== Biography ==
Ben Khayal was previously the first secretary at the Libyan embassy in Rome in the late 1960s. Bin Khayal served as Libya's First Secretary and Adviser for the Libyan Mission to the United Nations, New York at the UN Security Council during Libya's 1976-1977 membership term. During his term at the UN he also worked in the capacity of Deputy Delegate with Mansour Rashid El-Kikhia. He was also Libya's ambassador to Korea but resigned in 1984 after a gunman fired from the Libyan embassy in London at a protest outside, killing police officer Yvonne Fletcher.

After defecting, Bin Khayal joined the ranks of the Libyan National resistance and was later named the Deputy Secretary General of the National Libyan Alliance. In 2005, after the killing of Kikhia, he served as chairman and later as president for the National Conference of the Libyan Opposition. During the Libyan Civil War, the Conference declared support for the National Transitional Council and allocated all possible resources towards the service of the nation.
