= Mahmoud Jibril =

Libyan politician (1952–2020)

- محمود جبريل
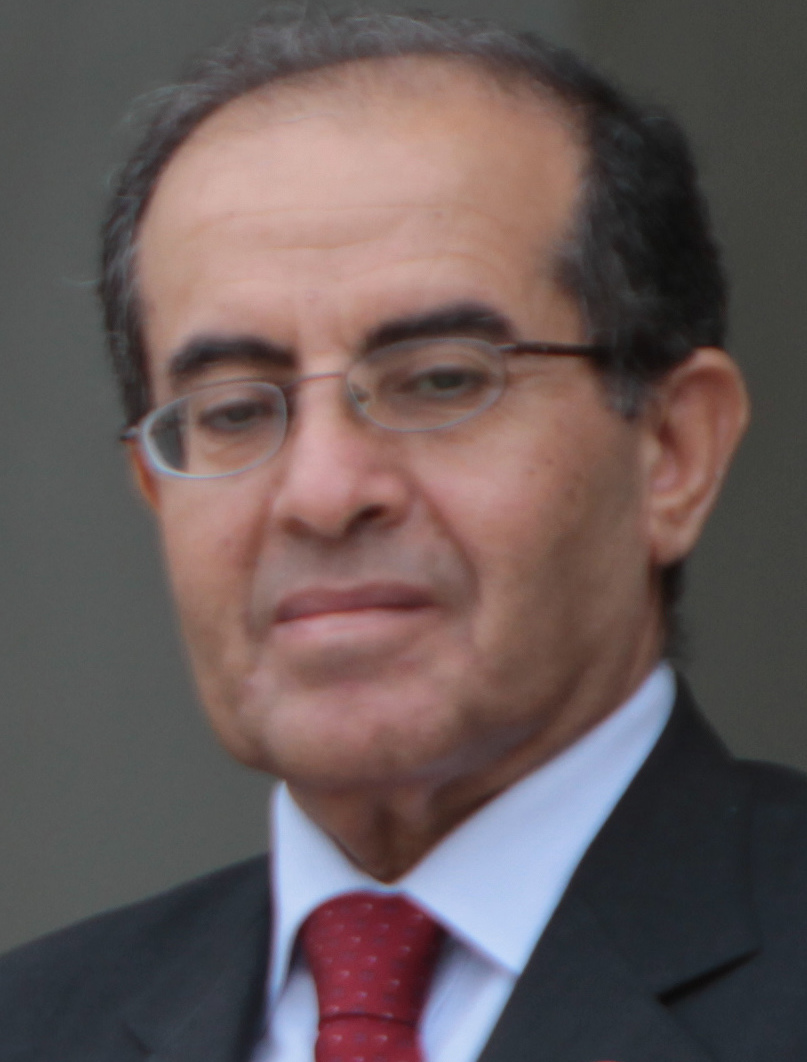
- Jibril in 2011

Prime Minister of Libya
- In office 5 March 2011 – 23 October 2011
- President: Mustafa Abdul Jalil
- Deputy: Ali Abd-al-Aziz al-Isawi; Ali Tarhouni
- Preceded by: Baghdadi Mahmudi
- Succeeded by: Ali Tarhouni (Acting)

Minister of Foreign Affairs
- In office 5 March 2011 – 22 November 2011
- Prime Minister: Himself; Ali Tarhouni (Acting); Abdurrahim El-Keib
- Preceded by: Abdul Ati al-Obeidi
- Succeeded by: Ashour Bin Khayal

Leader of the National Forces Alliance
- In office 14 March 2012 – 5 April 2020
- Preceded by: Position established
- Succeeded by: TBD

Personal details
- Born: Mahmoud Jibril el-Warfally; 28 May 1952 Bayda, Libya
- Died: 5 April 2020 (aged 67) Cairo, Egypt
- Cause of death: Cardiac arrest and complications from COVID-19
- Party: National Forces Alliance
- Education: Cairo University; University of Pittsburgh

Mahmoud Jibril el-Warfally (Arabic: محمود جبريل الورفلي), also transcribed Jabril or Jebril or Gebril (28 May 1952 – 5 April 2020), was a Libyan politician who served as the interim Prime Minister of Libya for seven and a half months during the overthrow of Muammar Gaddafi and the Libyan Civil War, chairing the executive board of the National Transitional Council (NTC) from 5 March to 23 October 2011. He also served as the Head of International Affairs. As of July 2012, Jibril was the head of one of the largest political parties in Libya, the National Forces Alliance.

Toward the end of the conflict, Jibril was increasingly referred to by foreign governments and in media as the interim prime minister of Libya. Jibril's government was recognized as the "sole legitimate representative" of Libya by the majority of UN states including France, Turkey, the United Kingdom, the United States, Iran, and Qatar.

== Career ==
Jibril graduated in Economics and Political Science from Cairo University in 1975, then earned a master's degree in political science in 1980 and a doctorate in political science in 1985, both from the University of Pittsburgh.

Jibril led the team which drafted and formed the Unified Arab Training manual. He was also responsible for organizing and administering the first two training conferences in the Arab world in the years 1987 and 1988. He later took over the management and administration of many of the leadership training programs for senior management in Arab countries including Bahrain, Egypt, Jordan, Kuwait, Libya, Morocco, Saudi Arabia, Tunisia, and the United Arab Emirates.

From 2007 to early 2011, he served in the Gaddafi regime as head of the National Planning Council of Libya and of the National Economic Development Board of Libya (NEDB). While there, he was a protégé and close friend of Saif al-Islam Gaddafi and promoted privatization and liberalization policies.

=== National Transitional Council ===
On 23 March 2011, amidst the Libyan Civil War, the National Transitional Council officially formed a transitional government and Jibril was appointed to head it. Jibril led meetings and negotiations with French President Nicolas Sarkozy, a meeting that resulted in France officially recognizing the National Transitional Council as the sole representative of the Libyan people. He also met with UK Foreign Secretary William Hague and then-U.S. Ambassador to Libya Gene Cretz, successfully persuading them to publicly back the NTC.

Following his appointment as the NTC's head of government, Jibril was referred to by foreign officials as both as the interim prime minister and the chairman of the executive board, the title attributed to him by the NTC official website. References to Jibril as the prime minister, including by news organisations, foreign government ministries and world leaders, increased significantly after rebels entered Tripoli in late August 2011.

In his capacity as the NTC's top diplomat, Jibril was also referred to as the council's foreign minister, though this may have been a colloquial title. Qatar-based news organization Al Jazeera English also called him "the NTC's chief of staff" on at least one occasion.

The executive board was sacked en masse by decision of the NTC on 8 August over its sluggish response to the assassination of General Abdul Fatah Younis, Benghazi's top commander. Jibril was asked to form a new board subject to the council's approval. Though Jibril stayed on as the board's chairman, a spokesman for the NTC said he would be required to spend less time out of the country.

On 21 August, amidst the Battle of Tripoli, Jibril gave a televised speech urging revolutionary fighters against looting, revenge killing, abusing foreign nationals, and mistreating prisoners of war. He also called for unity and asked that police and army units in Tripoli disavow Gaddafi but remain at their posts. Jibril declared, "Today, all Libya's people are allowed to participate in the building of the future to build institutions with the aid of a constitution that does not differentiate between a man and a woman, sects or ethnicities. Libya is for everyone and will now be for everyone. Libya has the right to create an example that will be followed in the Arab region."

In September, Jibril "proposed 36 names for a new cabinet, including friends and relatives, and retained the prime minister and foreign minister slots for himself." He later retracted the proposal when NTC members objected, but an anonymous council official said it had "left a bitter taste".

==== Resignation ====
On 3 October 2011, Jibril announced that he would resign from government once the country had been "liberated". He later specified this meant the capture of Sirte from loyalist holdouts. On 20 October 2011, Sirte was captured and Muammar Gaddafi was killed. Keeping his promise to leave at the war's end, Jibril resigned three days later. He was succeeded by Abdurrahim El-Keib on 31 October.

=== In the National Forces Alliance ===
In 2012, Jibril became a member of the newly founded political union, the National Forces Alliance. On 14 March 2012, he was elected leader of the alliance. Jibril represented his party in the General National Congress election.

In the national elections of 7 July 2012, Jibril described his party as a supporter of democracy and also as an advocate of Sharia. The NFA won the largest number of seats in these elections. At the time, Jibril ran for a second term as prime minister. Jibril won the first round of voting, with 86 votes, significantly more than the 55 votes obtained by his primary opponent, Mustafa Abushagur. However, in the second round of voting, Abushagur ultimately defeated Jibril.

== Death ==
On 21 March 2020, Jibril suffered a cardiac arrest, and was admitted to the Ganzouri Specialized Hospital in Cairo, Egypt. Three days later, he tested positive for COVID-19, which he died from on 5 April 2020, at the age of 67.

== Works ==
- el-Warfally, Mahmoud G., Imagery and Ideology in U.S. Policy Toward Libya, 1969–1982, University of Pittsburgh Press (December 1988), ISBN 978-0-8229-3580-3

Political offices
Preceded by Baghdadi Mahmudi	Prime Minister of Libya; 2011	Succeeded by Ali Tarhouni; Acting
Party political offices
Preceded by Position established	Leader of the National Forces Alliance; 2012–2020	Vacant
