= Ali Tarhouni =

Libyan politician (born 1951)

- علي الترهوني
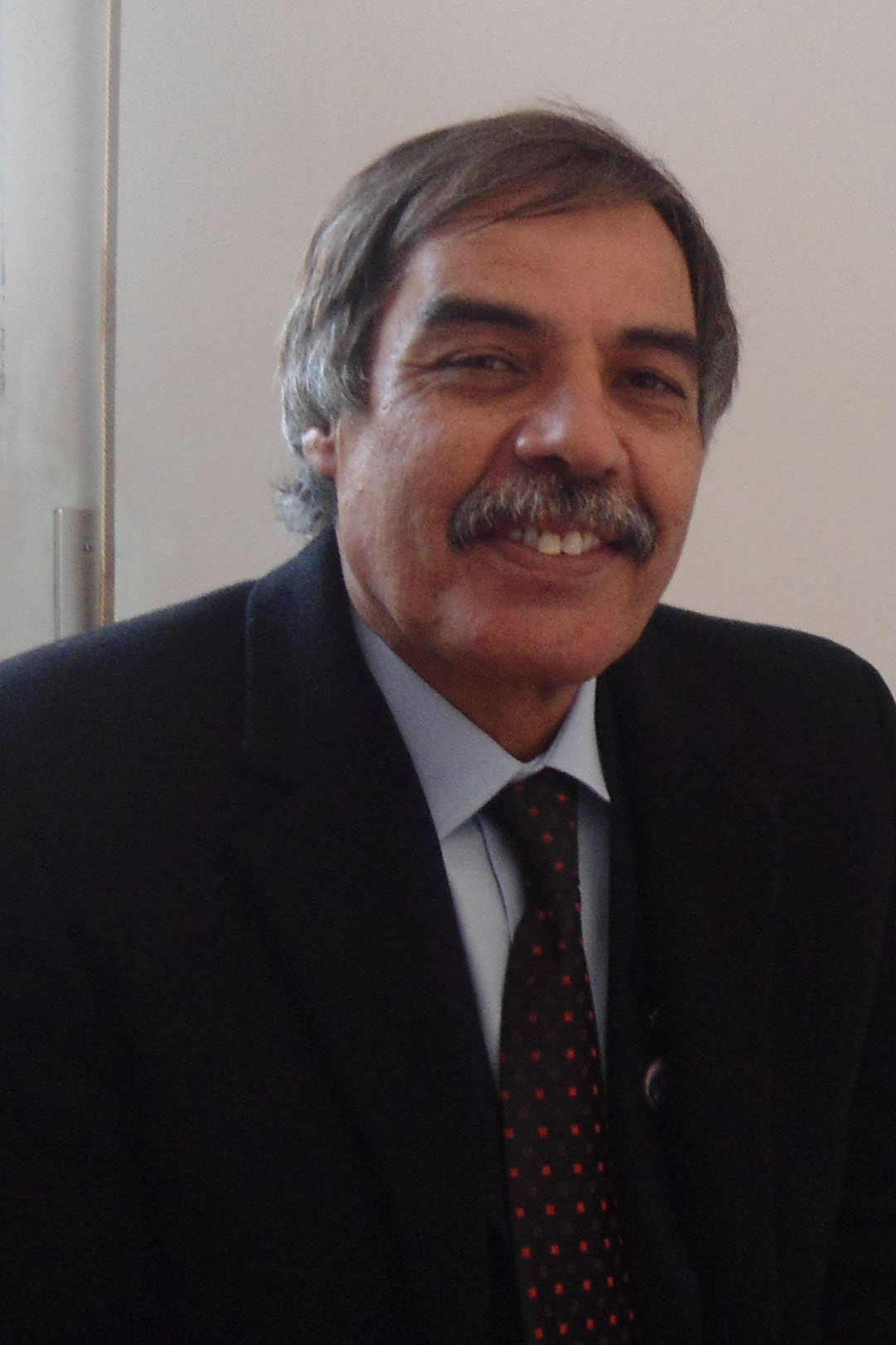

President of the Constituent Assembly of Libya
- Incumbent
- Assumed office 22 April 2014

Prime Minister of Libya Acting
- In office 23 October 2011 – 24 November 2011
- President: Mustafa Abdul Jalil
- Preceded by: Mahmoud Jibril
- Succeeded by: Abdurrahim El-Keib

Chairman of National Centrist Party
- Incumbent
- Assumed office 27 February 2012
- Preceded by: Office established

Deputy Prime Minister of Libya
- In office 2 October 2011 – 23 October 2011
- Prime Minister: Mahmoud Jibril
- Preceded by: Ali Abd-al-Aziz al-Isawi
- Succeeded by: Mustafa Abushagur

Minister of Finance
- In office 23 March 2011 – 22 November 2011
- Prime Minister: Mahmoud Jibril; Abdurrahim El-Keib
- Preceded by: Position established
- Succeeded by: Hassan Ziglam

Minister of Oil
- In office 23 March 2011 – 22 November 2011
- Prime Minister: Mahmoud Jibril; Abdurrahim El-Keib
- Preceded by: Position established
- Succeeded by: Abdulrahman Ben Yezza

Personal details
- Born: 1951 (age 74–75) Marj, Cyrenaica (now Libya)
- Party: National Centrist Party
- Education: University of Libya; Michigan State University

Ali Abdussalam Tarhouni (Arabic: علي عبد السلام الترهوني; born 1951) is a Libyan economist and politician. Tarhouni served as the minister for oil and finance on the National Transitional Council, the provisional governing authority in Libya, from 23 March to 22 November 2011. For a little over a week, he acted in the capacity of interim prime minister of Libya during the departure of outgoing incumbent Mahmoud Jibril from 23 October 2011 until Abdurrahim El-Keib was formally named to succeed Jibril on 31 October.

== Early life and education ==
Born in Libya, Tarhouni studied economics at the University of Libya, until fleeing the country in 1973. He was stripped of citizenship, sentenced to death in absentia, and put on a government hit list in 1981. After immigrating to the United States, Tarhouni continued his studies, earning a master's degree (1978) and a PhD (1983) from Michigan State University. From 1985 up until the outbreak of the Libyan revolution, he had been a popular senior lecturer in business economics at the University of Washington Michael G. Foster School of Business where he won numerous teaching awards.

== Political career ==
Tarhouni was named to head both the oil and finance ministries of the National Transitional Council, an opposition council formed to coordinate anti-Gaddafi elements during the Libyan Civil War in March 2011. He acted as a frequent spokesman for the council and wielded considerable influence as a prominent liberal in the opposition. He officially announced the transfer of the NTC from Benghazi to Tripoli on 25 August 2011.

On 3 September 2011, Tarhouni, acting as deputy chairman of the NTC's executive board, announced he was also chairman of a Supreme Security Committee, responsible for all security matters in Tripoli.

Tarhouni was named deputy prime minister on 2 October 2011 after acting in that capacity for several months. He succeeded Mahmoud Jibril as acting prime minister following Libya's declaration of liberation just 21 days later. On 31 October 2011, Tarhouni's term as acting prime minister ended with the election of Abdurrahim El-Keib in a vote taken by the 51 members of the NTC.

In 2012, Tarhouni founded the National Centrist Party, becoming its first leader. He said that his party would collaborate with Mahmoud Jibril's National Forces Alliance. He was elected as the head of the constituent assembly on 22 April 2014.

== After politics ==
Tarhouni said at a press conference in late November 2011 that he was offered a position in Keib's government, but he declined, claiming the new cabinet was "supported from the outside by money, arms and PR" in an apparent reference to the role of Qatar in backing the NTC. He criticised Keib's selection of government ministers as "the elite" and said the government was not sufficiently representative of the country.

In December 2011, Tarhouni returned to Seattle for a week. He gave a brief speech at the University of Washington on 20 December in which he reflected on his role in the Libyan revolution and talked about his hopes for a democratic transition, including his aim of forming a new political party. Tarhouni also walked back his earlier criticism of the interim government, expressing confidence in its good intentions.

Political offices
Preceded by Mahmoud Jibril	Prime Minister of Libya; Acting; 2011	Succeeded by Abdurrahim El-Keib
Party political offices
Preceded by Position established	Leader of National Centrist Party; 2012–present	Incumbent
