= Mustafa A. G. Abushagur =

Libyan politician

Mustafa A. G. Abushagur مصطفى ابوشاقور
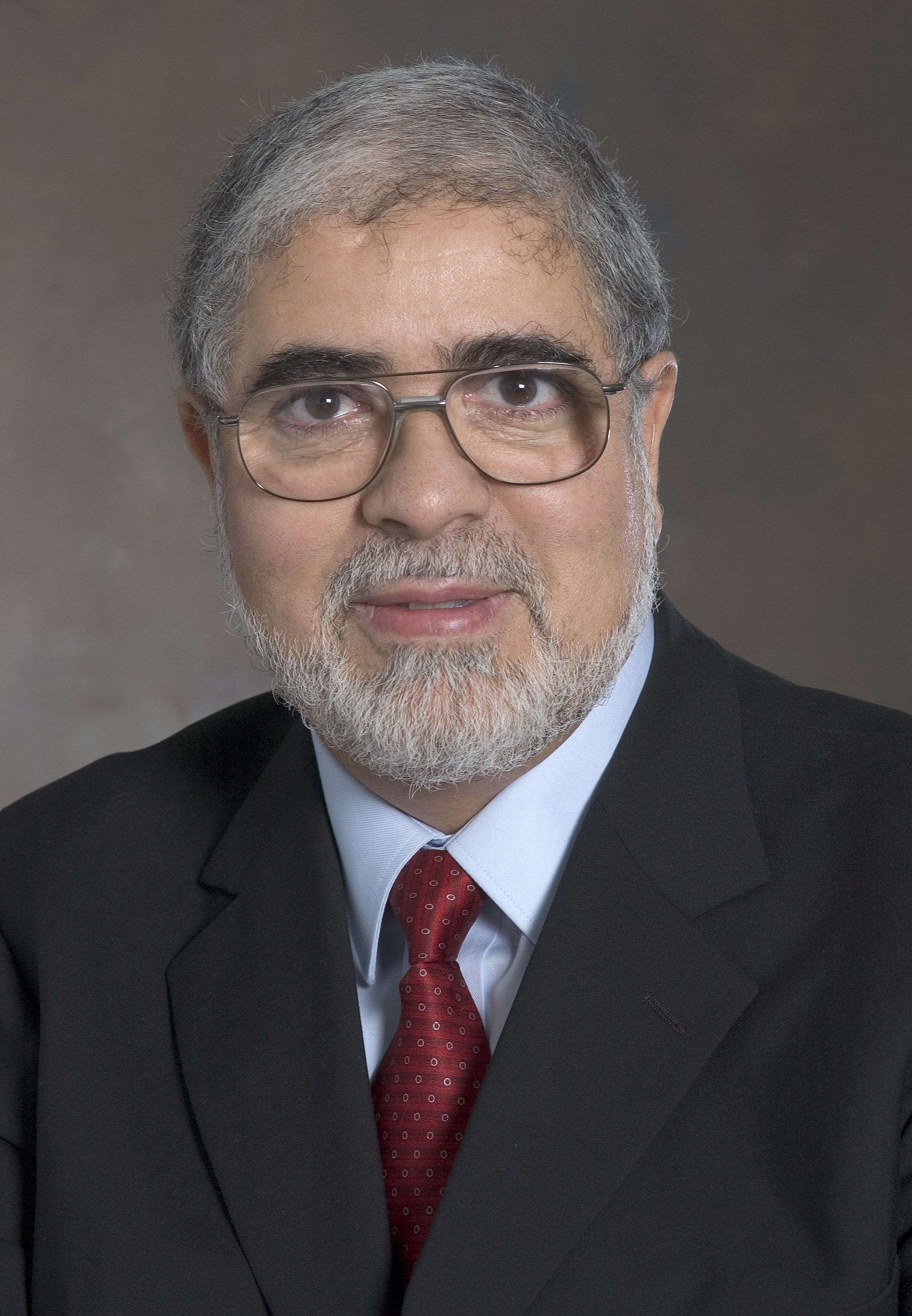

Deputy Prime Minister of Libya
- In office 22 November 2011 – 14 November 2012
- Prime Minister: Abdurrahim El-Keib
- Preceded by: Ali Tarhouni
- Succeeded by: Awad al-Baraasi (acting)

Personal details
- Born: 15 February 1951 (age 75) Tripoli, British Administration of Tripolitania (now Libya)
- Party: Independent (since 1992); National Front for the Salvation of Libya (1980–1992)
- Spouse: Fatma Ahmed (1977–present)
- Children: Ousama; Soumiea; Asmah; Sarrah; Noor
- Education: University of Tripoli; California Institute of Technology

Mustafa A. G. Abushagur (مصطفى ابوشاقور غيت ابوشاقور; born 15 February 1951) is a Libyan politician, professor of electrical engineering, university president and entrepreneur. He served as interim Deputy Prime Minister of Libya from 22 November 2011 to 14 November 2012 in Abdurrahim El-Keib's cabinet and was briefly elected to succeed El-Keib as prime minister in 2012, before failing to receive congressional approval for his cabinet nominees and being removed from office.

== Early life ==
Abushagur was born in the Souq Al-Jumuah district of Tripoli on 15 February 1951. When he was a few years old, his family moved to the western mountain city of Gharyan, where they resided for sometime before returning to Souq Al-Jumuah in Tripoli.

== Education ==
He began his education in Gharyan. When he was in second grade, he moved to Souq Al-Jumuah schools where he continued his studies until he completed high school. He then studied at the University of Tripoli where he earned a BSc in electrical engineering. In 1975, Abushagur moved to Pasadena, California, to continue his education at the California Institute of Technology (Caltech). During his time at Caltech, he earned a MSc in electrical engineering in 1977 and earned his PhD in 1984.

== Career ==
Abushagur began his academic career as a visiting professor at the University of Rochester, New York, in 1984. Then he joined the University of Alabama in Huntsville (UAH) in 1985 as an assistant professor of electrical and computer engineering (ECE) and became full professor in 1995. While working in the ECE department, he proposed a plan to start an optical engineering undergraduate program. He went on to develop the curriculum and was the Chairman of the Optical Engineering Committee for the remainder of his time at the university. This program became the first to receive the ABET accreditation in optical engineering in the USA. During his time at UAH, Abushagur received multiple research awards and grants from several federal agencies, such as NASA, NSF, DoD and the FAA. While on sabbatical leave from UAH, Abushagur was involved in two start-up companies. The first start-up was Photronix (M) Sdn. Bhd. in Malaysia, an optical fiber component company, which he founded in 1998 with private equity. From 1998 to 2002, Abushagur was the president and CTO before returning to his position at UAH. His second start-up was LiquidLight, which was an optical networking equipment developer, which was founded through venture capital. He was the co-founder, CTO and vice president of LiquidLight from 2000 to 2001.

In 2002, Abushagur was the founding director of the PhD program in microsystems engineering at the Rochester Institute of Technology (RIT). In early 2007, he led the effort to establish a satellite campus in the Middle East and drove the negotiations between RIT and the Emirati government's Dubai Silicon Oasis in Dubai, UAE. The satellite campus was opened in fall 2008 and Abushagur became the founding president of RIT Dubai.

Abushagur's key research areas are nanophotonics, plasmonics, photonic microsystems, adaptive signal processing, optical MEMS, optical computing, optical communications, optical interconnects and fiber sensors. He holds three patents, has published ninety-eight research papers, published a book on Fourier optics and has been invited to write five book chapters. As a result of his significant contributions to the field of optics, the field of photonics and for pioneering educational programs, Abushagur was named a fellow of the Optical Society of America and the International Society of Optics and Photonics (SPIE). He also won numerous awards such as the Space Act Award from the NASA Inventions and Contributions Board in 2004, served as an editor for several professional journals and cumulatively received approximately thirteen million dollars in research grants and funding.

In 2013, he received the Optical Society of America's Robert E. Hopkins Leadership Award for his "leadership in education and entrepreneurship, which led to establishment of important programs, institutions and companies devoted to developing optics in the United States, the Middle East and North Africa."

== Political career ==
In the 1970s, Abushagur became a staunch opponent of the Gaddafi regime. While at Caltech, Abushagur was actively working with other regime opposition members in the United States. Abushagur had met many Gaddafi dissidents while at the University of Tripoli, such as Abdurrahim El-Keib in 1971. El-Keib later went on to become the second interim Prime Minister of Libya during the Libyan Civil War. His contact with El-Keib, as well as many other dissidents, continued after his move to California, where many of them attended universities. This common goal of overthrowing the Gaddafi regime solidified their resolve as they all actively worked to end Gaddafi's rule of Libya for the next three decades. In 1980, Abushagur made his final visit to Libya to say farewell to his family before his Gaddafi opposition group started to openly oppose the regime. Abushagur became involved in the creation and leadership of several opposition groups, including the National Front for the Salvation of Libya (he later left the National Front in 1992). As a result of these political activities, he was placed on Gaddafi's wanted list in early 1981. Abushagur and his fellow dissidents lived in exile outside of Libya for the next thirty-two years. In May 1984, the National Front for the Salvation of Libya attempted to overthrow the Libyan regime. The failed attempt resulted in the execution of many of the Libyan dissidents who had studied in the United States, while many others were arrested. Gaddafi televised their public executions and had many of the dissidents interrogated on television. During the televised interrogations, Abushagur's name was mentioned several times. These confessions caused Abushagur's family in Libya to face significant hardships for many years to follow.

At the beginning of the 17 February Revolution, the National Transitional Council (NTC) began appointing representatives from the districts and cities of western Libya in an effort to create a unified front for the entire country against Gaddafi. Due to the military crackdown in the west by Gaddafi, many of the representatives that were chosen by the NTC lived abroad in order to safeguard the identities of anti-Gaddafi figures living in western Libya. Abushagur joined the delegation representing the west, central and south of Libya to Benghazi to show their support for the NTC. For the formal announcement of the NTC representatives in May 2011, Abushagur flew to Benghazi and set foot on Libyan soil for the first time in nearly thirty-two years. For the remainder of the revolution, Abushagur continued to work behind the scenes as advisor with the NTC and was a regular guest on Al-Aan TV and Al-Arabiyah TV as a Libyan affairs analyst.

On 22 November 2011, Abushagur was named the Deputy Prime Minister of Libya. Two days after being named Deputy Prime Minister, he took his oath of allegiance, which stated: "I swear by Almighty God to perform my duties honestly and faithfully, to stay faithful to the objectives of the Seventeenth of February Revolution, to respect the constitutional declaration and bylaws of the Council, to carefully honor the interests of the Libyan people and to safeguard the independence of Libya, its security and its territorial integrity."

On 12 September 2012, Abushagur became the first elected Prime Minister-designate in the modern history of Libya. He was elected by a vote of the General National Congress of Libya from eight nominees. He received 96 votes in the final round of voting, against rival Mahmoud Jibril's 94 votes.

While Abushagur was widely referred to as Libya's prime minister, he was never actually sworn in as he was not able to win approval from the GNC for his cabinet proposals. On the submission of his second cabinet proposal, he made an impassioned speech calling on Congress members to reject alleged partisanship and unite in support of his government. Despite this, Congress voted by a large majority to dismiss him, and he was removed from office on 7 October 2012.

After losing the job of prime minister-designate, Abushagur continued to serve as deputy prime minister until Ali Zeidan was elected by the GNC to form a government. Zeidan's cabinet won approval from Congress and he was sworn in on 14 November, relieving Abushagur of his role.

=== 2014 Election ===
Abushagur was elected to the Libyan House of Representatives in the July 2014 election. He was elected for the Suq al-Juma district of Tripoli, as one of its 5 representatives. Abushagur won 14,305 votes, which was the largest number of votes won by any candidate on the general list in the entire country. He was widely expected to be elected President of the House when it first met on 4 August 2014.

=== Kidnapping ===
On the early afternoon of 29 July 2014, Abushagur was kidnapped from his home in Hay al-Andalus by an armed group, who were travelling in several vehicles, including an unmarked ambulance. The group reportedly forced him at gunpoint into the unmarked ambulance, in front of his wife, daughters and another relative. As Abushagur was being driven away with a gun pointed at his head, a relative who was present at his home attempted to follow them in his personal vehicle; however, two other vehicles that were involved in his abduction moved in and blocked the road, preventing him from pursuing.

Abushagur was released at approximately 3:00 am on 30 July. Abushagur was released unharmed, with no ransom being paid.

The following day, Abushagur held a press conference at the Rixos Conference Hotel where he accused the Zintani militia group as Barq Al-Nasr (Victory Lightning) as being behind his 9-hour kidnapping. Abushagur claimed that the ambulance he had been forced into took him to a barracks in the Swani area of Tripoli. He stated that his captors repeatedly asked him to reveal unspecified information. He claimed that he was also accused of being a member of the Muslim Brotherhood; an accusation which he denied. After being asked by his captors whether he supported General Haftar's Operation Dignity, Abushagur replied that he did not support any operations outside the state. He also claimed that his captors accused him of being wealthy and demanded 20 million Libyan dinars. After several hours of interrogation by his captors, he was escorted to a jail cell and remained there for several hours. Some time later, he was removed from the jail cell and a few hours later he was released.

At the conference Abushagur stressed that his kidnappers did not physically harm him, and also stressed that he believed the militia was not acting on behalf of the city of Zintan, but were instead acting on their own initiative. Abushagur claimed that he was freed after another Zintani suddenly released him, and stated that he was still unsure of the reasons for his abduction. At the end of his statement Abushagur refused to take any questions.

In late August 2017, Abushagur resigned from the Libyan House of Representatives (HoR), accusing it of blocking the implementation of the Libyan Political Agreement (LPA).
