= International recognition of the National Transitional Council =

The National Transitional Council (NCT) governed Libya from 2011 to 2012 and was recognised by a majority of, but not all, international states.

By 2012, 104 United Nations members and two observer states had announced that they recognised the NTC as the legitimate representative of the Libyan people, and some of them had indicated that they were recognising the NTC as the only legitimate representative of the Libyan people, severing diplomatic relations with Gaddafi's government in the process. Additionally, non-UN members, including Kosovo, Palestine, and the Republic of China (Taiwan), also granted recognition. The European Union and several individual countries, such as Switzerland, established a diplomatic presence in Benghazi, the former de facto headquarters of the council and the continuing location for many of its offices. NTC officials also met with representatives of Iceland and Mauritania, among other states, though these states were not known to have established permanent diplomatic relations (informal or formal) with the NTC.

The United Nations General Assembly, with 114 member states in favour to 17 opposed, voted on 16 September 2011 to recognise the NTC as holding Libya's seat at the United Nations. On 20 September 2011, the African Union officially recognised the National Transitional Council as the legitimate representative of Libya.

In November 2025, Tunisia, Algeria, and Egypt, in coordination with the United Nations Support Mission in Libya, called for national unity in Libya.

== International standing ==
Libya Countries that recognised the National Transitional Council as the sole legitimate representative of Libya during the civil war Countries with informal relations with the NTC, or which voted in favour of it assuming Libya's UN seat, but did not establish formal recognition Countries which opposed the NTC assuming Libya's UN seat, but did not make a formal statement on recognition Countries which formally opposed the NTC

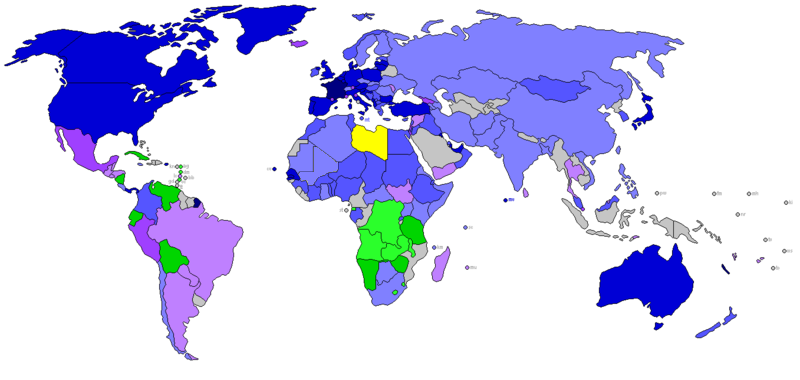
Recognition order of the NTC Libya Recognised before UNSCR 1973 (17 March 2011) Recognised before the Rebel Coastal Offensive (15 August 2011) Recognised before the end of the Battle of Tripoli (28 August 2011) Recognised after 28 August 2011 Supported transfer of Libya's UN seat, issued earlier statements of support Supported transfer of Libya's UN seat, no formal statements on recognition Opposed transfer of Libya's UN seat, no formal statements on recognition Opposed transfer of Libya's UN seat, formally opposed the NTC

The council stated that it would like to be recognised by the international community. The Chairman of the Council told Al Jazeera that "there are official contacts with European and Arab [countries]".

=== Recognition ===
As of 30 November 2011, 102 UN member states and four other countries have stated they recognise the National Transitional Council as the sole legitimate representative body of Libya. On 15 July, many of these countries constituting the Libya Contact Group issued a joint statement that they consider the council to be Libya's "legitimate authority".

The number of countries recognising the NTC has increased rapidly since its fighters' entry into Tripoli on 21 August. Prior to the start of the battle, 35 UN member states had granted recognition. After the United Nations General Assembly voted to recognise the NTC's designated representative, acknowledging the council as Libya's governing authority, several countries that had previously opposed international recognition of the NTC reversed their stance by recognising it.

The NTC has been recognised by all five permanent members of the UN Security Council, though the recognitions of Russia and China followed anti-Gaddafi fighters' takeover of Tripoli, as well as all European Union member states. All of the G4 nations except Brazil have also recognised the NTC. All NATO members except Iceland have formally recognised the council. However, both Brazil and Iceland voted in favour of the NTC at the UN.

Rank	Entity	Date and status of recognition	Notes
1	France	Recognised on 10 March 2011	On 5 March 2011, French foreign ministry spokesperson Bernard Valero stated France's support for the council saying that France "pledges support for the principles that motivate it and the goals it has set itself". French foreign minister Alain Juppé referred to Gaddafi's actions as "criminal folly". An Élysée source announced plans to send an ambassador to Benghazi. On 29 March, a French official told AFP that Antoine Sivan, a French diplomat, was on his way to Benghazi to represent France. Alain Juppé issued a statement on 7 June 2011 that the National Transitional Council is the "sole repository of governmental authority, in France's relations with the Libyan state". On 29 August, France reopened its embassy in Libya.
2	Qatar	Recognised on 28 March 2011	The Qatari government and the National Transitional Council concluded a deal on 27 March 2011 for the Gulf state to market oil exports from the territory administered by the council, and Qatar recognised the council as Libya's sole legitimate representative the next day. Qatar's recognition of the council received vocal support from the Gulf Cooperation Council.
3	Maldives	Recognised on 3 April 2011	On 3 April 2011, the President's Office of Maldives released a press statement stating that the Maldives has officially decided to recognise the National Transitional Council as the sole legitimate representative body of the Libyan people. "The Maldives will always support people who stand up against human rights violations," said President Mohamed Nasheed. "The Libyan National Transition Council has become the sole legitimate representative of Libya and its people," the President added. President Mohamed Nasheed has pledged the Maldives’ support to the NTC in a letter, repeating recognition as the "sole legitimate representative of the Libyan people."
4	Italy	Recognised on 4 April 2011	On 28 February 2011, Italian foreign minister Franco Frattini said at that time that "only Italy has contacts with the new Libyan National Council". Italian government has supported the UN resolution and has stated their willingness to support and participate on international military intervention. Foreign Minister Franco Frattini stated that Italy has decided to recognise the National Transitional Council in the eastern Libyan city of Benghazi as its "only legitimate interlocutor" in Libya. On 1 September Italy has reopened its embassy.
5	Kuwait	Recognised on 13 April 2011	Foreign Affairs Minister Mohammad al-Sabah said during the meeting of a contact group in Doha that Kuwait has taken steps to support the Libyan people and the National Transitional Council that are "tantamount to accepting its legitimacy". On 4 April, Sheikh Mohammad al-Salem al-Sabah, the Kuwaiti foreign minister, told Reuters that formal recognition of the Libyan opposition council is due "in a few days". The Voice of Russia reported on 22 April that Sabah had announced Kuwait's recognition of the council on 13 April. On 22 August, Kuwait foreign minister repeated the recognition and support of Kuwait government for NTC. The same day Libyan ambassador in Kuwait recognised NTC.
6	Gambia	Recognised on 22 April 2011	The West African state of Gambia said it recognised the National Transitional Council as the only legitimate body representing Libyan interests. The Gambia also expelled Tripoli's diplomats.
7	Jordan	Recognised on 24 May 2011	The government said it would soon dispatch a permanent diplomatic envoy to Benghazi, according to Foreign Minister Nasser Judeh on 24 May 2011, who announced the recognition this day. The Jordanian government announced recognition of the TNC "as the legitimate government" on the 22 August.
8	Senegal	Recognised on 28 May 2011	Senegalese president Abdoulaye Wade declared that his country officially recognises the NTC as the legitimate opposition of Libya on 20 May. He also declared that the NTC should lead the transition of power. Eight days later, after meeting with top NTC officials, he declared the body was recognised as the "legitimate representative of the Libyan people".
9	Spain	Recognised on 8 June 2011	Foreign Minister Trinidad Jiménez announced on 13 April that Spain would send a permanent diplomatic mission to Benghazi, headed by José Riera, in two weeks' time. Its purpose was to be to "formalize Spanish relations with the LNC and to conduct institutional meetings with its members". A rebel spokesman mistakenly said Spain had recognised the council on 5 May 2011, which the Spanish government denied. Spain formally recognised the council a little more than a month later as "the only legitimate representative of Libya", according to press reports.
10	Australia	Recognised on 9 June 2011	Foreign Minister Kevin Rudd described the council as the "legitimate interlocutor of the Libyan people" and indicated that Australia's grant of diplomatic recognition was in line with that granted by countries like France, Qatar, and the United Kingdom.
11	United Arab Emirates	Recognised on 12 June 2011	Foreign Minister H.H. Sheikh Abdullah bin Zayed Al Nahyan said in a statement on 12 June that "There is no legitimacy in Libya today but of the TNC".
12	Germany	Recognised on 13 June 2011	Vice-chairman of the NTC Abdel Hafiz Ghoga said during a visit to Benghazi of Germany's foreign minister Guido Westerwelle that "He said clearly ... that the national council is the legitimate representation of the Libyan people". On 2 September at the Paris Conference Friends of Libya German chancellor Angela Merkel "have invited representatives of the National Transitional Council to Germany," and announced that the German Embassy in Tripoli would reopen soon, what happened 27 September 2011.
13	Canada	Recognised on 14 June 2011	The government of Canada announced that they have recognised the National Transitional Council as "the legitimate representative of the Libyan people." On 12 September it reopened its embassy in Tripoli.
14	Panama	Recognised on 14 June 2011	Panamanian president Ricardo Martinelli recognised the National Transitional Council as "the legitimate representative of the Libyan people."
15	Austria	Recognised on 18 June 2011	Deputy Chancellor Michael Spindelegger, who also holds the portfolio of the Foreign Ministry, said he would travel to Benghazi on 19 June to meet with the council. The day before Spindelegger's scheduled departure, Vice-Chancellor Alexander Schallenberg stated that Austria will officially recognise the NTC as the sole legitimate representative of the Libyan people, but Spindelegger would not be able to make his trip as planned due to security concerns.
16	Latvia	Recognised on 20 June 2011	During a visit to Latvia of NTC member Abdurrahman Shalgam the Political Director and Undersecretary of State of the Ministry of Foreign Affairs of Latvia, Andris Razāns, announced that "Latvia recognises the Transitional National Council of Libya as the political interlocutor representing the Libyan people during this interim period."
17	Lithuania	Recognised on 20 June 2011	On 20 June in Vilnius, Lithuanian Vice-Minister of Foreign Affairs Asta Skaisgirytė Liauškienė hosted the representatives of NTC Shalgam Abdul Rahman and Hafed Gaddur. Vice-minister said that "Lithuania is considering the National Council as the political interlocutor during this interim period".
18	Denmark	Recognised on 22 June 2011	On 19 April 2011, The Libyan Observatory for Democracy and Human Rights, a non-governmental organisation and umbrella organisation for the National Transitional Council opened an office in Copenhagen. On 5 May, Danish government spokesperson Jean Ellermann Kingombe said Copenhagen hasn't taken that step of formal recognition, but considers the council "a relevant partner for dialogue". Later, following a media offensive by Gaddafi against Denmark, the Libyan consul general to Denmark, Denmark broke what was left of its relations with Gaddafi and expelled Gaddafi's diplomat. On 22 June, during a visit to Benghazi, Foreign Minister Lene Espersen announced that, "In the current transition period Denmark regards the TNC as the sole legitimate representative of the Libyan people". On 31 August, ahead of a meeting of the Libya Contact Group, the Ministry of Foreign Affairs reiterated that the Danish government views the NTC as "Libya's legitimate government authority".
19	Cape Verde	Recognised on 26 June 2011	The Libyan ambassador to Cape Verde resigned in April. On 26 June, the Cape Verdean government called the NTC "the legitimate interlocutor" for Praia during the civil war. It reiterated its recognition on 26 August in a full press release and expressed its desire to see "peaceful political action to set up a transitional government to hold free and fair elections". On 1 September the secretary of state for Foreign Affairs José Luis Rocha said that his country would resume cooperation with Libya when it establish an elected, legitimate government in the capital.
20	Bulgaria	Recognised on 28 June 2011	Initially, Bulgaria was one of the few NATO countries to explicitly refuse to recognise the NTC, but then made a U-Turn in late June. At first, Foreign Minister Nickolay Mladenov said his country will not recognise the National Transitional Council as a legitimate government, stating that such an action would be against Bulgaria's long-term interests and the safety of its citizens in Libya. Prime Minister Boyko Borisov has confirmed this position, pointing out that representatives of the NTC are linked to the imprisonment and torture of five Bulgarian nurses and a Palestinian doctor (see HIV trial in Libya). As of 31 March, Bulgaria remained the only EU member with a functioning embassy in the official capital Tripoli; however, following attacks on other embassies in Tripoli, the Bulgarian Ministry of Foreign Affairs announced that its embassy was evacuated to Djerba in neighbouring Tunisia on 1 May 2011. Vesela Cherneva, the MFA spokesperson, said the move was temporary and the embassy would return once circumstances allowed it. On 28 June, the foreign ministry announced their recognition of the council as the legitimate representative of Libya upon its visit to Benghazi as a joint statement with Croatia. Despite their earlier statements, Foreign Minister Mladenov said that "Brutally assaulting his own people, Colonel Gaddafi has irreversibly lost all claims to legitimacy" and furthermore (in contrast to Bulgaria's earlier wariness toward the no-fly zone) "As Nato allies, Bulgaria and Croatia support irrefutably the international coalition and its mission in Libya." On early night 22 August some unidentified persons have looted the Bulgarian embassy in Tripoli. On 2 September Bulgarian police stormed the Libyan embassy and forced out diplomats of Gaddafi's regime after a new ambassador appointed by NTC arrived.
21	Croatia	Recognised on 28 June 2011	The foreign ministry announced their recognition of the council as the sole government of Libya upon its visit to Benghazi, in a joint statement (shown above) with the Bulgarian representative.
22	Turkey	Recognised on 3 July 2011	Foreign Minister Ahmet Davutoglu recognised the council as a representative of the Libyan people during a visit to Ankara on 23 May 2011 by its chairman, Mustafa Abdul Jalil, although it still maintained its relations with Gaddafi at that time. While in Benghazi on 3 July, Davutoglu announced that Turkey considers the council to be "the legitimate representative of the Libyan people", and that it would cut its ties with Gaddafi's government. Turkey also "reassigned" its ambassador to Libya, who formerly served as Turkey's top diplomat in Tripoli, the same weekend. He also pledged $200 million in aid to the rebels. On 1 August, a Foreign Ministry spokesman said Turkey had "not broken off state-to-state relations with the Tripoli administration yet" and was continuing to allow the Libyan Embassy in Ankara to operate under the green flag, but it had ceased communicating with the embassy and would allow the NTC to open an office in Turkey. However on 22 August embassy staff changed flag above the embassy and NTC representative in Turkey entered the embassy to way for instructions from Benghazi. On 2 September Turkey reopened its embassy in Libya.
23	Poland	Recognised on 8 July 2011	During his visit to Benghazi on 11 May, Polish foreign minister Radosław Sikorski said "We recognize the council as the legitimate interlocutor of the international community and as a representative of the democratic aspirations of the Libyan people." On 21 June, the government announced its ambassador to Libya, Wojciech Brożek, would head up a permanent diplomatic office in Benghazi. On 7 July, Poland opened embassy in Benghazi. On 8 July, the Foreign Minister of Poland, Radoslaw Sikorski, announced that Poland recognised only the NTC as the "legitimate government of the Libyan people". At the fourth Libya Contact Group meeting in Istanbul minister Sikorski presented Poland's assistance package for Libya. It included proposals to launch the Polish medical mission in Misrata and a training mission for state officials (police or border guards), readiness for training the new personnel in Poland (including education at Polish universities). The Polish Press Agency reported that unofficially the Polish government could have supplied the rebels with anti-tank rocket launchers and military vehicles "some months ago" and officers of Polish Special Forces were helping in direct operations. Ahmed El-Mallul, a Libyan surgeon living in Poland is the mediator between the NTC and the Polish government. On 15 September Poland reopened its embassy in Tripoli.
24	Netherlands	Recognised on 13 July 2011	Originally, the Netherlands had refused to recognise, despite being involved in the no-fly zone. On 5 May 2011, a spokesman for the council said the Netherlands had recognised it as the legitimate representative of Libya. The Dutch Ministry of Foreign Affairs flatly denied the claim, saying, "That message is not correct." The Dutch government, though a participant in international operations in Libya under United Nations Security Council Resolution 1973, said in June it believes other states have moved too quickly in recognising or otherwise affirming the legitimacy of the National Transitional Council. During a meeting with Mahmoud Jibril, one of the leaders of the NTC, the ministers of Foreign Affairs of the Netherlands, Belgium and Luxembourg declared their recognition of the NTC as the preliminary legal representative of the Libyan people. On 3 September the Dutch Minister of Foreign Affairs Uri Rosenthal said at the European Union summit in Sopot that the Netherlands will reopen its embassy as soon as possible.
25	Belgium	Recognised on 13 July 2011	During a meeting with Mahmoud Jibril, one of the leaders of the NTC, the ministers of Foreign Affairs of the Netherlands, Belgium and Luxembourg declared their recognition of the NTC as the legal representative of the Libyan people.
26	Luxembourg	Recognised on 13 July 2011	During a meeting with Mahmoud Jibril, one of the leaders of the NTC, the ministers of Foreign Affairs of the Netherlands, Belgium and Luxembourg declared their recognition of the NTC as the legal representative of the Libyan people.
27	United States	Recognised on 15 July 2011	On 10 March 2011, Secretary of State Hillary Clinton met anti-Gaddafi opposition leaders during a trip to Egypt and Tunisia. After the meeting between Clinton and representatives of the council, the European Union and the U.S have decided to talk to the council without officially recognising them, in order to seek further information on the group and its goals. On 17 March, ahead of a U.N vote on a no-fly zone, Under Secretary of State William J. Burns affirmed U.S support for a no-fly zone, as well as more aggressive measures to restrain Gaddhafi, that the U.S is investigating transferring Gaddafi's frozen assets to the rebels, and that the NTC may open an embassy in Washington. On 29 March, the U.S. confirmed at a conference in London that it will send a formal representative to Benghazi. In late April, Ambassador Gene Cretz said the U.S. was continuing to consider formal recognition of the council, but in the meantime, it is providing strong informal support, including reportedly authorising international oil deals with rebel-held eastern Libya. On 13 May 2011, US National Security Adviser Tom Donilon said his government recognised the National Transitional Council as "a legitimate and credible interlocutor of the Libyan people" after meeting with Prime Minister Mahmoud Jebril. White House Press Secretary Jay Carney said that the U.S. had not yet decided to fully recognise the council as Libya's sole legitimate representative body. On 24 May, the NTC opened a formal diplomatic office in Washington, D.C. (the U.S. had already had an office in Benghazi with a formal envoy for nearly two months). On 9 June, Clinton said, "The United States views the Transitional National Council as the legitimate interlocutor for the Libyan people during this interim period," but Washington and Benghazi indicated that the U.S. still had not committed to the same level of formal recognition as France and several other countries. On 15 July, at an international conference on Libya held in Turkey, Clinton stated that the US had decided to formally recognise the TNC as the country's "legitimate authority", allowing the US to divert over $30 billion worth of Gaddafi regime funds frozen in the US to the TNC. On 19 July, after sending a message to Gaddafi that there would be no negotiation and that he must step down, the US began to urge other countries to recognise the NTC.
28	Japan	Recognised on 15 July 2011	At a meeting of a contact group in Istanbul, Vice Foreign Minister Hisashi Tokunaga said, "I would like to take this opportunity to declare that the government of Japan regards the NTC as the legitimate interlocutor of the Libyan people." On 22 August the Libyan embassy in Tokyo has changed its national green flag to the tricolor flag of the former Kingdom of Libya.
29	Albania	Recognised on 18 July 2011	On 29 March, Foreign Minister Edmond Haxhinasto said Albania would open its airspace and territorial waters to coalition forces and said its seaports and airports were at the coalition's disposal upon request. Haxhinasto also suggested that Albania could make a "humanitarian" contribution to international efforts. In mid-April, the International Business Times listed Albania alongside several other NATO member states, including Romania, Bulgaria, Greece and Turkey, that have made contributions to the military effort, although it did not go into detail. The Albanian Foreign Ministry announced on 18 July in a statement, "The Albanian government backs the activities of the National Transitional Council and its program for a democratic Libya, and considers the council to be the legitimate representative of the Libyan people." Even prior to recognition, Albania was a staunch supporter of the military intervention in Libya. On 22 August, the Ministry of Foreign Affairs congratulated "the people of Libya ... [on] marking the end of the dictatorial regime of Muammar Gaddafi" and said it would work to strengthen bilateral relations between Tirana and Tripoli, and on 23 August, Albanian president Bamir Topi congratulated the NTC on what it called "a historic moment in the deposal of one of the dictatorial regimes of our era". On 29 August, the Libyan Embassy in Tirana changed its flag from Gaddafi's green banner to the tricolour adopted by the NTC.
30	Slovenia	Recognised on 20 July 2011	The Slovenian Foreign Ministry announced on 20 July in a statement, "The Slovenian government recognises the NTC as the legitimate representative of the Libyan people until the establishment of a transitional authority in a post-Gaddafi Libya."
31	Montenegro	Recognised on 21 July 2011	The Montenegrin government published a press release online in which it said, according to an English translation, "The Government of Montenegro adopted the Decision on the recognition of the Libyan National Transitional Council (LNTC) as a legitimate political representative of the Libyan people." According to the release, the move was intended to be consistent with the United Nations Security Council, the European Council, and the Libya Contact Group. Media subsequently reported Podgorica considered the NTC to be Libya's legitimate government.
32	United Kingdom	Recognised on 27 July 2011	On 5 March 2011, Defence Secretary Liam Fox stated that "a small British diplomatic team" was in Benghazi. On 10 March, Britain and France released a statement calling on Europe to recognise the National Transitional Council. Britain was the first country to formally invite the National Transitional Council to open a diplomatic office within its borders. The Foreign Secretary William Hague said that the council was the "legitimate representative of the Libyan people". On 12 May 2011, Foreign Secretary William Hague stated that "Gaddafi should realise in our view that time is against him and it is the National Transitional Council that is the legitimate interlocutor representative of the Libyan people". He also announced that the NTC had been invited to open a mission in London. During a visit to Benghazi in June, he reiterated that the UK views the NTC as the "legitimate representative of the Libyan people." On 27 July 2011, William Hague confirmed that the United Kingdom will deal with the National Transitional Council as the "legitimate governing authority in Libya" and treat the NTC "as if they were the state of Libya". It was also stated that the UK would expel remaining Gaddafi regime diplomats, as the British Government no longer recognises them as representatives of the Libyan government, and invite the NTC to appoint a new Libyan diplomatic envoy to take over the Libyan Embassy in London. On 10 August 2011, the British Foreign Secretary announced that Transitional National Council was staffing the Libyan Embassy in London.
33	Portugal	Recognised on 28 July 2011	The Sydney Morning Herald reported on 11 March that Portugal recognised the council shortly after France, but it did not quote a source, and the claim was never corroborated by the Portuguese government or any other source. Portugal voted for United Nations Security Council Resolution 1973 and its UN ambassador asserted that "the regime that has ruled Libya for over 40 years has come to an end by the will of the Libyan people", referring to Gaddafi's government and the uprising against it. On 9 June, Portuguese Foreign Minister Luis Amado clarified that they had not yet recognised, but "the decision [to recognize NTC] will be taken soon by this government or the next." He said that while Lisbon plans to recognise the council and is dispatching a permanent diplomatic mission to Benghazi, his government has some concerns as to decisions it has made that it wants to be assuaged before it officially grants recognition. On 28 July, the Portuguese Foreign Ministry released a statement recognising the NTC "as the legitimate governing authority of Libya until the formation of a transitional authority".
34	Gabon	Recognised on 19 August 2011	After meeting with Mahmoud Jibril, President Ali Bongo Ondimba announced Gabonese recognition for the NTC as the Libyan people's legitimate representative. However, the formal instruction of the president about the recognition of NTC by government in Libreville was submitted at 14 August and implemented at 19 August. Libya's pro-Gaddafi ambassador to Gabon left the host country on 24 August after a formal request by the Gabonese government.
35	Tunisia	Recognised on 20 August 2011	Tunisia's cabinet spokesman, Taieb Baccouche, announced that Tunisia was ready to recognise the rebels as the sole legitimate government of Libya as soon as they came to negotiate for it. It gave three reasons for this action: that the shelling of its own people rendered Gaddhafi's government illegitimate, that it still resented Gaddhafi's support to President Ben Ali during the Tunisian Revolution, and that Gaddhafi's shelling of its territory had rendered its previous strategy of neutrality ineffective. Abdul Jalil visited Tunisia on 18 June to meet with Prime Minister Béji Caïd Essebsi and said that Tunisia had not recognised his government publicly, but he believed the meeting indicated de facto recognition. On 20 August, the Tunis Afrique Presse (TAP) reported the Tunisian government recognised the NTC as the sole legitimate representative of the Libyan people, just after clashing with pro-Gaddafi Libyan troops in Tunisian territory the previous day.
36	New Zealand	Recognised on 22 August 2011	New Zealand Prime Minister John Key stated on 22 August 2011 that New Zealand's ambassador to Egypt will travel to the Libyan city of Benghazi to establish a working relationship with the Transitional National Council as the legitimate voice of the Libyan people.
37	Egypt	Recognised on 22 August 2011	Egyptian foreign minister Nabil Elaraby said on 25 May 2011 that his government would post former Deputy Foreign Minister Hany Khallaf in Benghazi to liaise with the council as Egypt's diplomatic envoy. On 22 August 2011 Egypt recognises the NTC as the sole legitimate government of Libya.
38	Morocco	Recognised on 22 August 2011	Morocco recognises the NTC as the only legitimate representative of the Libyan people. The Libyan embassy in Rabat announced on the same day its rallying to the NTC. In a statement to Moroccan TV channels "Al Oula" and "2M", aired on their evening news, Foreign Minister Taib Fassi Fihri stressed that "the Kingdom of Morocco confirms its recognition of the National Transitional Council as the sole and legitimate representative of the Libyan people and carrier of its aspirations for a better future based on equity, justice, democracy and the rule of law. The same day Libyan embassy and community in Morocco considered the NTC as the only legitimate representative of the Libyan people.
39	Ireland	Recognised on 22 August 2011	On 18 March 2011, Irish Minister of Foreign Affairs Eamon Gilmore stated, "I believe that Colonel Gaddafi has lost all legitimacy to rule and should be encouraged to leave the stage." Speaking in the Oireachtas on 22 March, Gilmore stated that as a country Ireland "supported those seeking to establish democracy in Libya". On 20 April, Gilmore met with the NTC's UK representative in Dublin, who claimed afterward that "Mr. Gilmore said that, in practical terms, he does look at the council as the true interlocutor and voice of the Libyan people, he does recognise our aspiration for a transition to democracy and he believes that Gaddafi and his sons must leave power. However, he reminded us that the policy of the Irish government is to recognise states and not political bodies." However, on 22 August, in his statement on developments in Libya, the Tánaiste of Ireland stated on the Department of Foreign Affairs' website, "The Libyan National Transitional Council is now the only authority in Libya, and I hope they will quickly be able to establish an effective government over the whole country."
40	Oman	Recognised on 23 August 2011	Citing the Associated Press, Qatar-based Libya TV reports that "Oman has recognized Libya's revolutionary-led council as the country's legitimate international representatives" and has broken off "relations with Moammar Gaddafi's regime in favor of the National Transitional Council". The Libyan embassy in Muscat decided to join the host country in recognising the NTC.
41	Bahrain	Recognised on 23 August 2011	On 23 August, the Ministry of Foreign Affairs of Bahrain published the following announcement: "Recalling the brotherhood and solidarity ties that link the Kingdom of Bahrain Government and people with the Libyan people, and out of the deep feelings that stem from the unity of the hopes, goals, and common destiny, and in light of recent developments in Libya, the Kingdom of Bahrain reiterates its recognition of Libya's Transitional National Council (TNC) as the sole legitimate representative of the brotherly Libyan people, wishes Libya to achieve prosperity, progress and stability, development and reconstruction."
42	Nigeria	Recognised on 23 August 2011	On 23 August it was reported by the media that "Nigeria's government said it recognized Libya's National Transition Council as the legitimate representative of the people in the North Africa nation."
43	Malta	Recognised on 23 August 2011	Prime Minister Lawrence Gonzi announced on 1 June 2011 that Malta is recognising the National Transitional Council of Libya as the sole legitimate interlocutor of the Libyan people. However, Foreign Minister Tonio Borg clarified on 2 June that Malta would retain an embassy in Tripoli and does not recognise the council as Libya's government, just as its legitimate interlocutor. However, nine days later, Malta clarified by saying that while they recognise the NTC only as a legitimate interlocutor, they recognise it as the only legitimate interlocutor, and that their relations with Gaddafi would be cut. On 18 July, Borg said Malta was continuing to consider granting "full recognition", but it would first have to determine what it could legally do with frozen assets belonging to Gaddafi's regime in the island country. On 21 August the Libyan embassy announced that it is recognising the NTC as the sole legitimate government of Libya. On 23 August, Gonzi said Malta recognised the NTC as Libya's legitimate government.
44	Iraq	Recognised on 23 August 2011	A statement on the Iraqi Foreign Ministry website read, "The cabinet decided today, 23 August 2011, to recognise the Libyan National Transitional Council as the only and legitimate representative of the Libyan people."
45	Greece	Recognised on 23 August 2011	After maintaining a diplomatic liaison presence in Benghazi since 15 May 2011, the Greek government recognised the NTC as "the legal entity that will lead the Libyan people to the critical new phase of a transitional process", Greek Foreign Minister Stavros Lambrinidis said on 23 August.
46	Colombia	Recognised on 23 August 2011	Colombian newspaper El Tiempo (Colombia) reported that President Juan Manuel Santos gave permission to the chancellor(minister of foreign affairs) to recognise the NTC as an interlocutor of the Libyan people. He also added that "the Libyan people deserve a regimen that respects human rights, liberty and a government that values democracy". During the visit of NTC representatives president announced that Colombia recognized the National Transitional Council as the legitimate authority of Libya.
47	Norway	Recognised on 23 August 2011	Officials of the Norwegian Ministry of Foreign Affairs have met several times with representatives from the NTC starting on 19 April 2011. In April, the Norwegian Foreign Ministry said, "We were ... concerned about who should be represented in an upcoming political process should Gaddafi retreat, agreeing that people who have been close to the old regime must also be represented in a new political process," but he made no mention of whether Norway had chosen to recognise the NTC or not. According to Russian envoy Mikhail Margelov, Norway's capital of Oslo is one of the venues in which revolutionary and loyalist officials have met for closed-door negotiations, although the NTC has frequently denied that it meets with representatives of Gaddafi's government. In late June, The Foreigner reported that the Ministry of Foreign Affairs had released a statement recognising the NTC as a "legitimate political body". On 23 August, Norwegian foreign minister Jonas Gahr Støre said his government believes "it will be important for a broad interim government to lead the country through a transitional phase" and therefore recognised the NTC as the legitimate authority in Libya.
48	Lebanon	Recognised on 23 August 2011	The Lebanese cabinet agreed at a meeting to transfer recognition to the NTC until an interim authority is in place.
49	South Korea	Recognised on 24 August 2011	On 22 August, unidentified persons broke into the residence of the South Korean ambassador and looted it. The same day an official from the Foreign Ministry has said that its country reached an agreement with rebel forces that they will honour existing contracts after civil war. Foreign Ministry announced also that other Korean ministries were negotiating with NTC about honoring the contracts signed by Gaddafi. A spokesman for the Foreign Ministry in Seoul said his government recognised the NTC "as the legitimate governing authority representing the Libyan people" and vowed its support for the council to "achieve political stability and peace, and to establish a free, democratic country".
50	Sudan	Recognised on 24 August 2011	In early July, the Sudan Tribune suggested that the Sudanese government may be working in support of the NTC, noting that President Omar al-Bashir has been a frequent critic of Gaddafi and asserting that "Sudan has unofficially given its blessings to the [council]". The Libyan community in Sudan took over the Libyan embassy in the Sudanese capital of Khartoum and appointed a new pro-NTC ambassador on 22 August. Sudan officially recognised the NTC as the legal representative for the Libyan people two days later and said it was "working to enter into practical relations" with the council. On 24 and 27 August Benghazi was visited by two Sudanese officials. The first was Mohamed Atta, head of Sudan's intelligence services. The second was Sudan's foreign minister Ali Karti.
51	Hungary	Recognised on 24 August 2011	On 3 June the Hungarian government has decided to accept to assume the protection of American diplomatic and consular interests in Libya. On 24 August, the Foreign Ministry informed the MTI that it recognised the rebel National Transitional Council (NTC) as the legitimate representative of Libya. "Hungary supports the council's efforts to stabilise Libya's internal situation and hopes that the NTC would restore order and security in the spirit of legality, and make all the required steps towards consolidation and reconstruction," the ministry's statement said.
52	Chad	Recognised on 24 August 2011	Although Chad was previously hostile to the no-fly zone and made statements supportive of Gaddafi, United States Secretary of State Hillary Clinton met with high-level Chadian officials and announced afterward that "the Chadian government does not support Gaddafi". She added, "We are very supportive of their efforts to reach out to the Transitional National Council, which they have been doing in a more sustained way in recent days." However, Chad retains an ambassador in Tripoli, Daoussa Déby (half-brother of President Idriss Déby), who previously appeared to support Gaddafi's claims that the Libyan rebels are affiliated with Al-Qaeda in the Islamic Maghreb. Foreign Ministry Secretary General Moussa Dago said Chad recognised the NTC as "the only legitimate authority of the Libyan people" on 24 August.
53	Ethiopia	Recognised on 24 August 2011	On 22 August, the Libyan embassy in Ethiopia recognised the NTC as "the country's legitimate representative". In a joint press conference with Nigerian Foreign Minister Olugbenga Ashiru and Ethiopian Foreign Affairs Minister Hailemariam Desalegn on 24 August, a spokesman for the Ethiopian government said, "The recent unfolding events in Libya have amply demonstrated that the National Transition Council is in the control of the greater part of Libya." The spokesman announced that Ethiopia was joining Nigeria in recognising the NTC as "the interim legitimate authority in Libya", and both Ashiru and Desalegn called on the African Union to do likewise.
54	Burkina Faso	Recognised on 24 August 2011	BBC reports, "Burkina Faso and Chad, two nations which received large amounts of aid from Libya under Col Gaddafi, have now joined the list of more than 40 countries recognising the rebels' NTC as Libya's legitimate authority. Although Burkina Faso initially said it would offer Col. Gaddafi exile if he requests it, On 6 September Burkina Faso canceled their offer of exile, saying that harboring Gaddafi would "create too many problems" for their country.
55	Serbia	Recognised on 25 August 2011	On 23 August, the Libyan embassy in Belgrade raised the flag of the Libyan rebels. Two days later, the Serbian National Assembly adopted a resolution recognising the NTC as the legitimate representative of the Libyan people.
56	Bosnia and Herzegovina	Recognised on 25 August 2011	On 22 August, the Libyan embassy was ransacked by pro-democratic Libyan students. Police responded when the protesters entered the building and raised the tricolor flag, and the students occupying the embassy were removed. Two days later, the Libyan ambassador announced his loyalty to the NTC. On 25 August, the three-member presidency of Bosnia and Herzegovina released a statement recognising the NTC as "the only legitimate representative of the Libyan people".
57	Mongolia	Recognised on 25 August 2011	The Mongolian Ministry of Foreign Affairs released a press statement stating, "Mongolia respects the resolve of the Libyan people and recognizes the National Transitional Council as the legitimate representative of the Libyan people. We fully support the transition of Libya into a democratic, just, and human rights respecting country."
58	Djibouti	Recognised on 25 August 2011	State-owned media reported that the Djiboutian government submitted documents to the Arab League and released a statement notifying the international community of its decision to recognise the NTC as the "legal and sole representative of the Libyan people until the setting up of constitutional institutions". The statement also congratulated the Libyan people on "the success of the 17 February revolution" and expressed hope for strong bilateral ties in future.
59	Ivory Coast	Recognised on 25 August 2011	Ivorian foreign minister Daniel Kablan Duncan said Yamoussoukro considers the NTC "the sole legitimate representative of the Libyan people". Duncan also called for the NTC to initiate a national dialogue and hold "free, open, and transparent elections" as soon as possible.
60	Macedonia	Recognised on 25 August 2011	The Ministry of Foreign Affairs announced that "Macedonia joins to the efforts and activities of the international community for implementation of the goals of the resolution from 1970 and 1973 of the Council of the UN. Macedonia, as the EU, implements all restrictions against Libya approved by the Council of the EU. Macedonia recognises the National Transitional Council as legal representative of the Libyan people and Libya itself".
61	Cyprus	Recognised on 26 August 2011	On 24 August a group of Libyans living in Cyprus arrived at the embassy in Nicosia. The Libyan Ambassador Mustafa Al Mgherby met with them. The ambassador agreed to take down the green flag. Foreign Minister Erato Kozakou-Marcoullis has recognised NTC "as the legitimate representative of the country's people".
62	Malaysia	Recognised on 26 August 2011	On 23 August, the Libyan embassy in Kuala Lumpur was closed by its employees. On 26 August, the embassy staff decided to change flag. The Malaysian foreign minister Anifah Aman said in a statement on 26 August that his country's government recognised the National Transitional Council as "the legitimate interim government" of Libya.
63	Rwanda	Recognised on 26 August 2011	On 26 August, Foreign Minister Louise Mushikiwabo called on the African Union to "support" the NTC and said, "We support the National Transitional Council. ... We think that Colonel Gaddafi has run out of time as a leader." In Addis Ababa, Ethiopia, Mushikiwabo said Rwanda recognised the NTC as "the sole and legitimate representative of the Libyan people" even though the AU Peace and Security Council opted not to do so.
64	Estonia	Recognised on 26 August 2011	The Estonian government published a press release online on 11 March 2011 claiming European Union leaders, including Estonian prime minister Andrus Ansip, called for Gaddafi to leave power at a summit in Brussels, Belgium. Ansip was quoted as saying, "What is taking place in Libya right now is an extensive and brutal violation of human rights. At the meeting, we expressed strong solidarity with the Libyan people." Estonia also pledged €50,000 for International Red Cross humanitarian aid efforts in Libya. On 18 July, Foreign Affairs Minister Urmas Paet said, "During the transition period Estonia's sole partner for legitimate political communication is Libya's National Transition Council." Paet also condemned "human rights violations and crimes against humanity in Libya" and hailed the Libya Contact Group, "whose goal is to support the people of Libya in their endeavours towards change and towards a unified, sovereign and democratic Libya", Paet said. Paet expressed Estonia's support for the NTC on 26 August, calling it "the interim authority until a[n] elected Libyan government is formed".
65	Benin	Recognised on 26 August 2011	Late on 26 August, the government of Benin issued a statement recognising the NTC. The next day, Beninese and Nigerien officials held a joint press conference to announce their recognition of the council.
66	Niger	Recognised on 27 August 2011	An official statement read out on national radio said in part, "The Niger government acknowledges the regime change in Libya and formally recognises the NTC as the only authority representing the Libyan people."
67	Togo	Recognised on 27 August 2011	In an official statement the Togolese Foreign Ministry announced that the government recognized the NTC as "the sole legitimate representative of the people and interests in Libya". Reuters reported that Togo had decided to echo neighbouring Benin's recognition a day after the larger country transferred recognition to the NTC.
68	Guinea	Recognised on 28 August 2011	The foreign minister of Guinea Niankoi Lama announced : "The Government of the Republic of Guinea, deeply concerned about the grave situation in Libya, decided, as of today August 28, 2011, to recognize the National Transition Council, CNT Libya, as the only legitimate authority, representative of the brotherly people of Libya. "
69	Czech Republic	Recognised on 29 August 2011	Foreign Minister Karel Schwarzenberg, after meeting with a representative from the NTC, stated on 14 June that although the Czech Republic had not yet recognised the NTC as the legitimate government of Libya, it offered "material assistance", as well as "expert advice" on the transition to democracy. On 29 June, when visiting Benghazi, Schwarzenberg stated the Czech Republic recognised the NTC as the credible representative of the Libyan people and handed over a shipment of humanitarian aid worth 2.5 million Koruna and offered medical care for Libyan children. However, on 29 July, Schwarzenberg clarified that while Prague maintains contact with the NTC via an unofficial Czech ambassador in Benghazi, "I may like them, but unless they control the whole country, I will not recognise them officially." Speaking to journalists at the Libyan consulate in Prague on 22 August, Libyan Chargé d'Affaires, Nuri al-Ghavi expressed appreciation towards the Czechs and government for their stance in Libya. But at the same time, he was disappointed with the lack of official recognition of the NTC by the government. Libyan organisations in the Czech Republic have said this will damage bilateral relations. The government eventually recognised the NTC on 29 August 2011.
70	Philippines	Recognised on 30 August 2011	The Libyan embassy in the Philippines formally informed the Philippine Department of Foreign Affairs (DFA) in a note that the embassy is no longer representing Libya under Gaddafi but the National Transitional Council (NTC). As a result of their decision, the diplomats may be expelled if the Libyan Foreign Ministry would request Manila not to recognise them as Libya remains under Gaddafi government hands. Libyan rebels have contacted with DFA to assure that they allow Filipinos to leave Libya. They also visited their embassy in Tripoli to prepare repatriation arrangements. DFA on 24 August expressed support for the NTC in Libya and stated that Libyan embassy officials still have diplomatic status. On 30 August the DFA stated that the Philippines recognizes the NTC as the legitimate government of the Libyan people during this period of transition in the country and hopes that it will lead the country towards peace and stability. The Philippines seeks to contribute in rebuilding Libya "in the form of Filipino professionals in the construction, energy and medical fields". The government also gave thanks to the Libyan people for keeping Filipinos in Libya safe throughout the conflict.
71	Slovakia	Recognised on 30 August 2011	On 23 August the Ministry of Foreign Affairs of the Slovak Republic declared that Gaddafis regime has lost legitimacy. The Slovakia declared that is prepared to support and work with Libya in founding "democracy and respect to human rights". Slovak foreign minister Mikuláš Dzurinda stated on 30 August that Bratislava "recognized National Transitional Council as of 30 August as the sole representative of Libya" and believes that "National Transitional Council will guarantee adherence of law, justice and human rights for all Libyan citizens."
72	Armenia	Recognised on 31 August 2011	The Armenian National Congress, the main opposition bloc in Armenia, issued a statement on 1 September congratulating "Libyan people" for triumphing over Gaddafi. It also appeared to hail the NTC, saying, "After Tunisia and Egypt, Libya was the next in a row to win its right for legitimate authorities, establishing democracy, and developing a free society in a law-governed state." On 2 September Spokesman of Ministry of Foreign Affairs of Armenia answered the question of recognition of NTC by Armenia with this words: "Through the Embassy of Libya in Paris the note of the MFA of Armenia on the recognition of the National Transitional Council of Libya, dated from 31 August, has already been handed over."
73	Russia	Recognised on 1 September 2011	Foreign Minister Sergei Lavrov said on 24 May that Russia will be recognising the Council as a "legitimate negotiator for the country's future." Lavrov, Russia's Foreign Minister specified by saying that the NTC "does not seek to be recognized as the only legitimate representative of the Libyan people, but wants to be seen as a legitimate partner in negotiations on Libya's future". Russia, however, had not broken off relations with Gaddafi, and met him via Presidential Envoy Mikhail Margelov on 8 June. On 18 July, Russia specified that it would not recognise the NTC as the official authority of Libya, because that would be picking a side in the war. On 24 August, Russian president Dmitry Medvedev stated that "if the rebels have the power and spirit and opportunity to unite the country on a new democratic basis, then of course we will consider establishing relations with them". The Libyan People's Bureau in Moscow lowered the Gaddafi-era green flag on 24 August 2011, but by 26 August 2011, the embassy was flagless, in what The Moscow Times saw as a sign that Libyan diplomats were still weighing up their allegiance. On 1 September, the Russian government officially recognised the NTC as the government of Libya, and expects that contracts signed with the Gaddafi government would be honoured. On 3 September FM Lavrov invited NTC to Moscow for talks about the new Russian energy projects in Libya.
74	Finland	Recognised on 1 September 2011	On 10 August, Finnish foreign minister Erkki Tuomioja said his government considers the NTC to be a legitimate representative of the Libyan people, but it does not consider it to be Libya's legal government. Tuomioja said Helsinki's policy is to recognise states, not governments. However, in a press release on 1 September, the Foreign Ministry declared, "Finland, as other EU countries, considers the National Transitional Council as the legitimate governing authority in Libya and, at this stage, as the sole representative of the state and people of Libya."
75	Romania	Recognised on 1 September 2011	In April, the Romanian government said it recognised the NTC as "a political interlocutor". Romanian officials visited Benghazi to meet with NTC officials on 25 July. On 26 August, the Romanian government invited the NTC to send a delegation to visit Bucharest. President Traian Băsescu said just before the Libya Contact Group met in Paris, France, on 1 September, that he recognised the NTC as Romania's "sole partner" in Libya until a better alternative emerged, such as through democratic elections. The embassy of Romania reassumed its work on 2 October.
76	São Tomé and Príncipe	Recognised on 1 September 2011	
77	Ukraine	Recognised on 1 September 2011	On 22 August, the Libyan embassy in Kyiv lowered the green flag and raised the tricolour adopted by the National Transitional Council. On 1 September, the Ukrainian Foreign Ministry said in a statement that it was recognising the NTC "as the only lawful representative of the Libyan people".
78	Azerbaijan	Recognised on 2 September 2011	On 22 August, the Libyan embassy in Baku lowered the green flag. Azerbaijan's ambassador to Libya, Aghasalim Shukurov, told Radio Liberty that his country "will try to establish relations with the new government in Libya". On 2 September, the Azerbaijani Foreign Ministry put out a press declaration saying in part, "The Republic of Azerbaijan respects the will of the Libyan people and recognizes the Interim Transitional Council of Libya as the authority of Libya."
79	Botswana	Recognised on 2 September 2011	Foreign Affairs Minister Phandu Skelemani said Botswana recognised the NTC "as a legitimate opposition force in Libya", until elections were held or until a unity government was formed between the NTC and the Gaddafi regime. Botswana was among the first countries to break off relations with Gaddafi's government over his response to protests in February. On 2 September, the Ministry of Foreign Affairs released a statement saying Botswana "has decided to join other members of the international community in recognising the Libyan National Transitional Council (NTC) as the Interim Administration in Libya". It also invited the NTC to reopen the Libyan Embassy in Gaborone. On 11 September government invited NTC to reopen Libyas embassy in Botswana's capital.
80	Kazakhstan	Recognised on 5 September 2011	From 25 August Libyan embassy in Astana "is officially under flagship of the National Transition Council". In statement on 28 August Kazakhstan Foreign Ministry announced that "Kazakhstan ... is respectful to the choice and political will of Libyan people in this dramatic period" and called the Organisation of Islamic Cooperation to aid Libya. On 5 September Foreign Minister of Kazakhstan Kairat Sarybai received Chargé d'Affaires of Libya Ahmed ad-Diba and informed him about Kazakhstan's decision to recognize NTC "as the country's acting government".
81	Central African Republic	Recognised on 5 September 2011	On 5 September Minister of Foreign Affairs Antoine Gambi announced in a statement on the national radio that his country recognised NTC "as legitimate interlocutor of the international community" and "the political body supposed to defend and protect the rights of the Libyan people."
82	Comoros	Recognised on 5 September 2011	On 5 September in phone interview for PANA the Chief of Staff of the Ministry of Foreign Affairs of Comoros, Aboubacar Shakur said that for government in Moroni NTC "is the legitimate representative of the Libyan people." He added that their "position is governed by our membership in the League of Arab States and our solidarity with its position regarding the case of Libya."
83	Seychelles	Recognised on 7 September 2011	Minister of Foreign Affairs of Seychelles Jean-Paul Adam said in a statement that government in Victoria was moving to accredit the Libyan Embassy in the Seychelles to the National Transitional Council, thus recognising the council as the governing authority of Libya, because "the government feels that the TNC authorities are the best placed to represent the interests of the Libyan people and help the country take the necessary steps to achieving democracy". Adam said that "the best custodian of that progression is the TNC".
84	Ghana	Recognised on 9 September 2011	On 24 August, Gwede Mantashe, secretary general of South Africa's ruling party African National Congress, said that Ghana is considering recognition of NTC. The Ghana News Agency reported on 9 September that the Ghanaian government, citing "the NTC's effective control over a greater part of the country and the commitment of the NTC to democratic and pluralistic elections", had decided to diplomatically recognise the NTC.
85	China	Recognised on 12 September 2011	According to a Foreign Ministry statement from Beijing, the ambassador of the People's Republic of China to Qatar met and "exchanged views on developments in Libya" with Chairman Abdul-Jalil in early June. The statement provided no further details regarding the meeting. Later, on 22 June, Beijing stated that it viewed the NTC as a "major political force" and an "important dialogue partner". By mid-August 2011, according to the Financial Times, the PRC had a small "temporary delegation" stationed in Benghazi to maintain relations with the NTC, and Beijing may resume construction projects in the city. On 22 August the PRC foreign minister said that the PRC "respects [the] Libyan people's choice." The next day the employee of the Libyan embassy in Beijing lowered the all-green flag used by the Gaddafi regime since 1977 and adopted the tricolour flag currently used by the NTC. On 12 September 2011 the PRC officially recognized the National Transitional Council (NTC) of Libya as the ruling authority and representative of the Libyan people.
86	Afghanistan	Recognised on 13 September 2011	In a statement, the Afghan Foreign Ministry said it recognised the National Transitional Council "as the legal representative of the Libyan people" in accordance with a ministerial resolution passed the previous day.
87	Vietnam	Recognised on 14 September 2011	Vietnam delegation at the United Nations gave the note to support the national transitional Council (NTC). The statement was made on 14 September by the Vietnamese Foreign Ministry Spokesman Luong Thanh Nghi. "Vietnam respects all decisions made by the Libyan people and hopes the process of power transfer in Libya will take place smoothly, ensuring the independence, sovereignty, and territorial integrity of the North African country. Vietnam expects that the NTC and Libyan political forces will take effective measures to soon resume peace and stability in the country, and hold a general election for a government of national reconcile and harmony which represents the will and interests of the entire Libyan people, said the diplomat.Vietnam wishes to cooperate with the new government in an effort to boost the ties of friendship between the two countries, spokesman Nghi said, adding that Vietnam is ready to take part in the reconstruction of Libya within its capabilities."
88	Chile	Recognised 16 September 2011	The Ministry of Foreign Affairs expressed it desire to promote the cooperation between Chile and "the new authorities" of Libya, taking account the "consolidation of a new political reality".
89	Costa Rica	Recognised 16 September 2011	On 16 September the government of Costa Rica recognised NTC in Libya as "legitimate representative" of the Libyan people.
90	India	Recognised on 17 September 2011	On 22 August, a group of Libyan expats replaced the green flag in the Libyan embassy in New Delhi with the tricolour flag adopted by NTC. According to Deccan Herald the Libyan diplomats under command of Second Secretary Jalal E Beram have taken control of the chancery and denied entry to embassy to the pro-Gaddafi staff led by chargé d'affaires Ramadan El Baba. On 17 September 2011, the Ministry of External Affairs said in a statement "India extended support to the acceptance of credentials of the delegation of the Transitional National Council of Libya led by its President Mustafa Abdul Jalil to attend the forthcoming UN General Assembly session in New York."
91	Iran	Recognised on 18 September 2011	On 23 August the foreign minister of Islamic Republic of Iran congratulated Libyan insurgents taking of Tripoli and indicated that Iran "is prepared to share its experiences on the path to realising freedom, justice, ... and development ... with the brother nation of Libya". Libyan embassy staff in Teheran is on "holiday". Two days later Libya's diplomatic mission declared its "complete solidarity with February 17" movement. On 30 August, Foreign Minister Ali Akbar Salehi telephoned Chairman Mustafa Abdul Jalil to congratulate him on "the victory of the Muslim people of Libya" and invite him to Tehran. However, Salehi did not describe a change in Iranian recognition. The Iranian ambassador returned on 15 September to Tripoli. Iran voted for accreditation of the NTC's designated UN ambassador on 16 September, and on 18 September, a top Iranian MP declared that "Iran has officially recognized the Libyan Transitional Council" while expressing the government's "reservations" over the continued NATO operations in Libya.
92	South Africa	Recognized on 20 September 2011	In early June, President Jacob Zuma said his administration was attempting to work with both the government in Tripoli, which South Africa continues to recognise as the legitimate representative of Libya despite voting for military intervention at the United Nations Security Council, and the "rebels trying to oust [it]" to recover the remains of South African photojournalist Anton Hammerl, one of several foreign journalists killed during the Libyan civil war. On 22 August the South African government urged the "interim authority" in Tripoli to "institute ... political dialogue", but without specifically mentioning the NTC by name. On 20 September South Africa recognised the NTC, at the same time as the African Union officially recognised it. On 20 September, South Africa officially announced that they had recognized the NTC as the legitimate government of Libya, after previously being critical of the international community's recognition of them.
93	Uganda	Recognised on 21 September 2011	On 22 August, Ugandan International Relations Minister Henry Okello Oryem said, "Our relationship with Libya does not change. Uganda does not recognise individuals, but states. We shall continue to deal with Libya irrespective of who is in charge." Oryem said the Ugandan mission will stay in Tripoli just like the Libyan embassy remains in Kampala. On 28 August Libyans living in Uganda recognised the NTC as their government. After it the chairman of the Libyans in Uganda, Mohamed Ali Wahra, appealed to the government to recognise the rebels, what the government rejected. On 2 September Ugandan police blocked a rally in support of Libya's NTC, claiming demonstrations could trigger violence. On UNGA voting they abstained, but on meeting of Uganda delegation with Uganda vice-president Edward Ssekandi as head of delegation on 21 September they decided to recognise NTC "as the country's legitimate leadership and representative at the UN". On 20 October Uganda State Minister for International Affairs Henry Oryem-Okello announced that Uganda recognised NTC as de iure government of Libya.
94	Algeria	Recognized on 22 September 2011	Despite other statements condemning the no-fly zone, allegations of Algerian mercenaries fighting for Gaddafi and a history of good relations with Gaddafi's government, the foreign ministry of Algeria stated after a meeting with French diplomat Alain Juppe that it "rejects analysis [sic] that put the Algerian position on the side of Gaddafi regime." Foreign Minister Medelci said furthermore that "the Algerian position toward the Libyan issue is compatible with those expressed by the AU and the AL...Algiers stick on the African roadmap to peacefully resolve the conflict in Libya." Medelci did state, however, that Algeria refused demands to cut relations with Gaddafi, saying that "Algeria has the full sovereignty to take alike decisions...We are among the few countries of which embassy is still opened in Tripoli, as long as Libya is a member in the bodies of the UN." Since 27 June there were many reports that Algeria may be in contact with NTC. The rebel flag was raised on 22 August over the Libyan embassy in Algerian capital. The earlier night Algerian embassy has objected a "series violations" and the staff escaped to United Nations mission. The Algerian Foreign Ministry said the country had opened channels of communication with the NTC and suggested it would normalise relations with the council if it apologised for earlier accusations against Algeria. However, on 25 August, Reuters reported that according to a high-ranking Algerian official, Algiers would not recognise the NTC unless it made "a strong commitment" to fighting al Qaeda, a frequent foe of the Algerian government. A spokesman for the Algerian Foreign Ministry "categorically rejected" the report the next day after the government declared it would observe a policy of "strict neutrality" by refusing to recognise the NTC. However, on 1 September, Foreign Minister Medelci backpedaled, saying, "The National Transition Council has announced that it will soon be forming a government representative of all the regions of the country and once it does this we will recognise it." Algeria abstained from the United Nations General Assembly vote on whether to recognise the NTC as the Libyan government on 16 September. Medelci was quoted by Al Arabiya as saying Algeria recognised the NTC on 22 September and was prepared to "work closely" with the new Libyan authorities.
95	Sweden	Recognised on 24 September 2011	In several statements to Swedish media during July/August, Foreign Secretary Carl Bildt emphasised that the Swedish government does not recognise regimes, only states, and that Sweden then is in contact with the regime that controls the territory of the state. Upon a direct question, Bildt replied that Sweden had informal relations with the Transitional Council. On 11 August seven unidentified protesters broke into the Libyan embassy in Stockholm and threatened to commit suicide if the police came in. The Swedish police tried to negotiate, but at the end they stormed the building and arrested the protesters. On 24 September, after voting in favour of accrediting the NTC's representative to the United Nations days earlier, the Swedish government extended formal recognition to the NTC. Sweden was also the last EU country to recognize the NTC as Libya's only legitimate representative.
96	Kenya	Recognised on 24 September 2011	: Acting Foreign Affairs Minister George Saitoti said that his country is ready to "work with the people of Libya, the African Union and the international community to help build a new Libya", acknowledging the NTC as "the interim authority" and calling on it to hold an "immediate" national dialogue and new elections. On 26 August, Prime Minister Raila Odinga called on Gaddafi to formally relinquish power, saying, "The war is over and Mr Gaddafi's side has lost. He should do the honourable thing now and let the people of Libya go." On nnight 28/29 August embassy of Kenya in Libya was ransacked. On 1 September, the Kenyan Foreign Ministry emailed the news station Voice of America to disavow news reports that Kenya recognised the NTC, saying it is continuing to call for an inclusive unity government. On 2 September Kenyan Foreign Minister Moses Wetangula said the looting of the Kenyan Ambassador's residence in Tripoli was a "mere criminal act" and called on the NTC to negotiate with Gaddafi regime members. On 16 September Kenya representative in UN voted against accrediting the NTC to the NTC's representative of Libya, however after the new statement of African Union the Kenyan foreign minister Moses Wetang'ula announced that he had communicated the recognition of NTC to Prime Minister Mahmoud Jibril in New York. On 30 September Libyan embassy in Nairobi hoisted new flag.
97	Switzerland	Recognised on 29 September 2011	On 9 March 2011, Federal President Micheline Calmy-Rey met with a representative of the Libyan Transitional Council in Bern. According to a foreign ministry press release, Calmy-Rey and Council representative Jebril El-Waalfarvi discussed the situation in Libya. In the statement, Calmy-Rey "expressed her particular concern about the difficult conditions being experienced by the civilian population, which continues to be exposed to the targeted and abhorrent violence of the Libyan authorities. Switzerland will do all in its power to support civilian victims of the civil war with diplomatic and humanitarian aid". On 12 June, Switzerland dispatched an official envoy to Benghazi to "intensify its political relations with the Libyan National Transitional Council" and "signal its intent to strengthen its presence there". Switzerland did not explicitly recognise the NTC, however it did state that "until the establishment of a legally elected government, the Transitional Council in Benghazi is the only legitimate partner of Switzerland in Libya" (German: Bis zur Etablierung einer rechtmässig gewählten Regierung sei der Übergangsrat in Benghasi der einzige legitime Ansprechpartner der Schweiz in Libyen, teilte das EDA weiter mit). Previously, relations with Gaddafi had already been cut long before, and there had been humanitarian aid coordinated with the NTC for four months. On 22 August, while addressing a conference in Lucerne, Calmy-Rey confirmed that Switzerland had not recognised the NTC because the Swiss government's policy is to recognise states and not governments, but it will continue to deal exclusively with the NTC as its partner in Libya until the election of a new government. Swiss representative in UN voted in favour of NTC. On 29 September Swiss foreign minister announced that Michel Gottret has been appointed as new ambassador to the "new Libyan government". From the Libyan side the NTC have sent their own new ambassador – Sliman Bouchuiguir – who presented his credentials to Swiss president at the same day.
98	Jamaica	Recognised on 29 September 2011	On UNGA voted in favour. On 29 September Minister for Information, Telecommunications and Special Projects, Daryl Vaz said that government in Kingston decided to recognise the NTC as "the legitimate representative of Libya".
99	Somalia	Recognised on 30 September 2011	The representative of Somali was absent at UNGA voting, but on 30 September ministers of Transitional Federal Government headed by Abdiweli Mohamed Ali at ordinary weekly meeting in Mogadishu decided to recognise NTC as "the rightful representative of the people".
100	Bangladesh	Recognised on 13 October 2011	On 21 February, the Libyan Ambassador to Dhaka, Ahmad Ateya Hamd Al-Imam, resigned as a protest against the Gaddafi government. On 25 August, the embassy defected en masse by pledging their allegiance to the people of Libya, as represented by the NTC, and removed Gaddafi's portraits and the green flag. Bangladesh on 13 October officially recognized Libya's new leadership as "the only acceptable interim authority," a statement from the Foreign Ministry said.
101	Mali	Recognised on 27 October 2011	On 29 August president Amadou Toumani Touré gave out an information: "The issue is not to recognize or not the NTC, since the NTC took power. The important thing to know is that the National Transitional Council may propose to the Libyan people democratic change." On 3 September at interview president Touré said: "Recognition (of NTC by Bamako) is a matter of time." On 13 September Malian FM Soumeylou Boubèye Maïga said that Mali shall recognise NTC just after the forming the new Libyan government. After the death of Muammar Gaddafi, Malian president Amadou Toumani Touré said he accepted the NTC's authority and, together with Algerian president Abdelaziz Bouteflika, expressed his hopes for "a rapid settlement of the crisis in this country, in line with the aspirations of the Libyan people".
102	Pakistan	Recognised on 3 November 2011	On 25 August the Libyan Embassy in Islamabad has raised the rebel flag above its buildings. On 8 September in an interview for local Pakistani newspaper The Express Tribune an official from Pakistani Ministry of Foreign Affairs said that the Ministry will officially recognise the NTC as the sole representative of the Libyan people. He added also that before recognizing Pakistan will consult Saudi Arabia and other allies in Middle East. On 15 September NTC warned Pakistan that if it not recognise NTC it will not revalidate residential visas of Pakistan diplomats. The source added that Pakistan government decided to not recognise NTC until "Col Qaddafi is holding the gun". At UNGA voting to approve the NTC credentials at UN the Pakistani representative was absent. On 15 October one of the senators from the Pakistan Muslim League-Nawaz - the party that supported the nomination of current prime minister Yousaf Raza Gilani - asked government to recognise the NTC. On the next day prime minister on the question of the journalist in Lahore about the letter from 15 October answered that he "took the decision to accord recognition four days ago", but the government formally decided about recognition on 3 November.
103	Guinea-Bissau	Recognised on 16 November 2011	
104	Mauritania	Recognised on 25 November 2011	The Rally of Democratic Forces, Mauritania's main opposition party, recognised the National Transitional Council as "the only legitimate representative of the Libyan people" in late May 2011. The status of relations between Nouakchott and both Tripoli and Benghazi is unclear, as President Mohamed Ould Abdel Aziz has called for Gaddafi's departure but has not publicly addressed the question of the council's legitimacy. In July, Foreign Minister Hamadi Ould Hamadi met with representatives of both the Gaddafi government in Tripoli and the NTC in Benghazi, and in early August, the NTC dispatched a special envoy to Nouakchott to personally thank President Abdel Aziz for his leadership. On 22 August demonstrators came into Libyan embassy in Nouakchott and tore down the green Gaddafi flag, replacing it with the tricolour Libyan flag. Several Mauritanian political parties issued statements congratulating Libya, including the Democratic Convergence Party and ruling Union for the Republic Party. On 25 November Mauritanian Ministry of Foreign Affairs and Cooperation announced that government of the country officially recognised NTC.
105	Eritrea	Recognized on 30 November 2011	President Isaias Afewerki was quoted by the Ministry of Information on 27 May as saying, "How can one recognize a parliament confined to the urban borders of Benghazi?" On 10 June, he was quoted as saying in reference to the NTC, "There are no legal grounds by which external powers can have a say in determining or recognizing factions or parties within a state as legitimate or illegitimate. Any attempts in that direction can be construed as overriding the rights and will of the people." On 30 November, Eritrea chose to recognize the TNC.
106	Saudi Arabia	Recognized on 1 January 2012	On 23 August the staff of Libyan embassy in Riyadh and the consulate in Jeddah decided to announce that they are shifting their allegiance to the anti-Gaddafi revolutionaries and unfurl the new flag next day. Libya and Saudi Arabia agreed to exchange ambassadors on 1 January 2012.
Other countries who voted "in favour" on 16 September 2011 of accepting NTC credentials as Libya representative at the UNGA.
	Brazil	Informal relations Unofficial Recognition; UNGA vote in favour of NTC	On 19 August, the Libyan embassy in Brasília was stormed by supporters of the rebels to replace the flag of Libya with the NTC flag in an attempt in which they failed. The supporters came back three days later and occupied the building. The same day pro-Gaddafi Libyan ambassador to Brazil, Salem al-Zubaidi, said he will remain in his post, because Brazilian authorities still consider him as an ambassador. On 22 August, the Brazilian press stated that the country's government is consulting the Arab League, the African Union, India, and the People's Republic of China in order to evaluate if Brazil will recognise the rebel government as Libya's legitimate government. On 25 August, the Libyan ambassador to Brazil, Salem al-Zubaidi, said that he supports the rebel government. Foreign Minister Antonio Patriota said on 2 September that Brazil's decision to participate in the Libya Contact Group conference in Paris the previous day "implies that we consider the transitional council an interlocutor in this process", though he said Brazil would not recognise the NTC as Libya's sole legitimate representative until the United Nations votes to accredit it. Although Brazil had not officially recognized the NTC, it was one of the countries that voted favorable to recognize it as the owner of Libya's seat at the United Nations during the Assembly, voted on 16 September 2011, and Juan Oliveira Bonfim, a member of the Brazilian Ministry of Foreign Affairs claims that it unofficially recognizes the NTC, but is waiting for the new Libyan government to establish itself properly before announcing it.
	Georgia	UNGA vote in favour of NTC	The Ministry of Foreign Affairs released a statement on 23 August expressing support for the NTC and hope that it would soon succeed in ousting Gaddafi and ushering in a democratic transition.
	Iceland	UNGA vote in favour of NTC	On 3 June Icelandic Minister for Foreign Affairs, Össur Skarphéðinsson, met with one of the NTC's representatives in the UK. The minister said, "The people of Libya should have the right to choose their leaders in democratic elections and to build a society where freedom and human dignity prevail. We stand by the National Transitional Council of Libya in its campaign for these goals." Iceland is also the only NATO member to not have officially recognised the NTC.
	Mexico	UNGA vote in favour of NTC	On 23 August Charge de Affairs of Libya's embassy in Mexico Ahmed Elhafi said that Mexican government is expected to formally recognise the council.
	Singapore	UNGA vote in favour of NTC	On 13 September, a spokesman for the Foreign Ministry noted that the NTC had taken control of most of Libya, including Tripoli, and said Singapore "fully supports" Indonesian Foreign Minister Marty Natalegawa's statement expressing ASEAN's endorsement of "on-going efforts involving the National Transitional Council to promote reconciliation and build a democratic and stable Libya in accordance with the aspirations and wishes of the Libyan people".
	Syria	UNGA vote in favour of NTC	On 22 August Libyan diplomats declared formal adherence to the National Transitional Council. "The National Transitional Council has decided after a meeting today to recognise the Syrian National Council as the sole legitimate government in Syria," said NTC member Mussa al-Koni at news conference in Tripoli.
	Yemen	UNGA vote in favour of NTC	On 22 August Yemen's government withdrew its delegation to the Arab League to avoid recognising the NTC. On 2 September Libyan diplomats hoisted the rebel flag above the embassy in Sana'a.
	Sri Lanka	UNGA vote in favour of NTC	On 22 October External Affairs Ministry spokesman said that Sri Lanka's embassy in Libyan will remain closed despite the death of Gaddafi, but assured that "The Sri Lankan government will continue to help the people of Libya rebuild their lives after a damaging war".
	Argentina	UNGA vote in favour of NTC	On 23 August Libyan embassy in Buenos Aires recognised NTC as "the legitimate authority" of the represented country.
	Guatemala	UNGA vote in favour of NTC	
	Belize	UNGA vote in favour of NTC	
	Saint Lucia	UNGA vote in favour of NTC	
	Peru	UNGA vote in favour of NTC	
	Paraguay	UNGA vote in favour of NTC	
	Moldova	UNGA vote in favour of NTC	
	Andorra	UNGA vote in favour of NTC	
	Liechtenstein	UNGA vote in favour of NTC	
	Monaco	UNGA vote in favour of NTC	
	San Marino	UNGA vote in favour of NTC	
	Israel	UNGA vote in favour of NTC	
	Madagascar	UNGA vote in favour of NTC	
	South Sudan	UNGA vote in favour of NTC	
	Mauritius	UNGA vote in favour of NTC	
	Thailand	UNGA vote in favour of NTC	
	Brunei	UNGA vote in favour of NTC	
	Timor-Leste	UNGA vote in favour of NTC	
	Vanuatu	UNGA vote in favour of NTC	
	Fiji	UNGA vote in favour of NTC	

==== UN observer states ====
	Entity	Date/Status of recognition	Notes
1	Palestinian Authority	Recognised on 22 August 2011	A spokesman for Palestinian Authority President Mahmoud Abbas said the PA as well as the State of Palestine and the Palestine Liberation Organization had recognised the NTC as Libya's legitimate government.
2	Holy See	Recognised on 20 October 2011	After the conclusion of the Battle of Sirte, the Vatican press office released a statement acknowledging the end of a "long and tragic" fight against Gaddafi's "cruel and oppressive regime" and recognising the NTC as Libya's legitimate authority in the wake of Gaddafi's death.

==== Non-UN member governments ====
	Entity	Date/Status of recognition	Notes
1	Kosovo	Recognised on 27 August 2011	On 22 August, the Foreign Ministry of Kosovo said it would work with the NTC and hoped it would recognise Kosovo's independence soon, something Muammar Gaddafi's government had refused to do. Five days later, Kosovar Foreign Minister Enver Hoxhaj sent a letter to Mahmoud Jibril congratulating him on his faction's success and informing him that Kosovo recognizes the NTC as Libya's "legitimate authority".
2	Republic of China	Recognised on 16 September 2011	On 16 September, the ROC Ministry of Foreign Affairs officially announced recognition of the National Transitional Council as the legitimate government of Libya.

=== Countries that voted "against" at the UNGA ===
Most of the SADC members, Kenya, and Equatorial Guinea (African Union chair at the time of voting) adopted statements about "all-inclusive government", unsuccessfully proposed to postpone the UNGA vote, and subsequently voted against accepting the credentials of the NTC.

- Angola
- Bolivia: Foreign Minister David Choquehuanca said on 9 September 2011 that Bolivia does not endorse the NTC and condemned "the actions of NATO in Libya". Choquehanca insisted Bolivia will "not recognize any transitional authority".
- Cuba: On 3 September 2011, the Cuban Ministry of Foreign Affairs announced in a communique that Cuba was withdrawing its ambassador from Libya, because it does not recognise the transitional government. The statement warned, "Cuba does not recognize the National Transition Council or any provisional authority and will only recognize a government that is established legitimately and without foreign intervention, via the free, sovereign will of the Libyan people," and strongly criticised the NATO intervention and "the deployment of diplomatic and operative personnel in the field" by the NTC's international allies. Cuban Foreign Minister Bruno Rodríguez Parrilla repeated the statement at the meeting of foreign ministers of Bolivarian Alliance for the Americas on 9 September 2011 in Caracas.
- Democratic Republic of the Congo
- Ecuador: On 27 August 2011, Deputy Foreign Minister Kintto Lucas said Quito would not recognise "a transition junta" until "the people declare it legitimate". Lucas added that the NTC was not a "real" government and so the Ecuadorian government could not recognise it. Lucas reiterated the government's position on 20 October, saying, "We do not recognize the NTC and we will continue in that line."
- Equatorial Guinea
- Eswatini
- Lesotho: Between 5 and 9 September, the Libyan embassy in Maseru hoisted a second flag – the NTC flag. Foreign Affairs Minister Mohlabi Tsekoa said that it is too early to declare Lesotho's stance as a country.
- Malawi
- Namibia: On 22 August, the head of the Libyan embassy in Windhoek, Salem Mohamed Krayem, decided to defect from the Gaddafi regime. Namibian officials such as Theo-Ben Gurirab, the Speaker of the National Assembly of Namibia, made conflicting statements. In March, Gurirab said he supported Gaddafi because "Africans [...] believe in existential friendship: once a friend, always a friend". In August, he said Gaddafi has lost "his vigilance on the red carpet, doing the danger dance, which doesn't stop". On 23 August, Namibian Foreign Affairs Minister Utoni Nujoma said officially that Namibia still has diplomatic relations with the Gaddafi government. On 22 September, the main opposition party – Rally for Democracy and Progress – recognised NTC, while the government decided not to recognise it until democratic elections were held.
- Nicaragua: On 3 September, President Daniel Ortega said that Nicaragua refused to recognise the National Transitional Council of Libya.
- Tanzania: On 28 August 2011, Foreign Minister Bernard Membe said that the Tanzanian government supports the AU's decision not to recognise the NTC, but said his government will recognise the NTC if it takes over the Gaddafi government's remaining strongholds and establishes executive, legislative, and judicial organs for the whole country. Otherwise, he said Dodoma would hold off on recognising a new government of Libya until nationwide elections are held. The Libyan Embassy took down the rebel flag after hoisting it at the embassy buildings in Dar es Salaam on 27 August: the flag was removed before the 48-hour ultimatum given by the Ministry of Foreign Affairs and International Co-operation ended. The green flag was not hoisted again, and the embassy also apologised to the Tanzanian government. Bernard Membe, Minister of International Cooperation and Foreign Affairs of Tanzania, said on 30 September that contacts between the NTC and the Government of Tanzania are "underway to normalize". On 9 November, Minister of Foreign Affairs of Tanzania said that his country would not recognise NTC unless the Libyan government would fulfill conditions set by the Africa Union.
- Venezuela: In March 2011, the government of President Hugo Chavez said that it refused to recognise the Benghazi government and insisted that only the previous government was legitimate. Reinaldo Bolivar, Venezuela's Vice-Minister of Foreign Affairs for Africa, also insisted that "there were no problems until a coalition of US and European countries began the shelling", and expressed his support for a "diplomatic solution to the crisis". On 23 August, as major rebel successes on the battlefield, including in Tripoli, coincided with a wave of recognition for the NTC, Chavez again stated that he would only recognise the government of Gaddafi. Chavez also accused the West of "kicking" and "spitting" on "the most basic elements of international law" (remarking that "This is like the caveman era"), and saying the United States "arranged this war. They provided the arms, the mercenaries. They better not attempt to apply the Libyan formula to Venezuela or we'll have to show them our power." On 25 August, Chavez denounced the latest attack against his country's embassy in Libya on 24 August, but the attack on the embassy is disputed by some reporters on place. On 26 October, Chavez said that "For us, there is no government in Libya" and "We don't recognize the government that NATO has installed."
- Zambia: On 3 November 2011, Foreign Minister Chishimba Kambwili said the government was waiting for Cabinet approval to recognise the new Libyan government and then Zambia would reopen its embassy in Libya, because "if the people of Libya have agreed to change government then we will respect that".
- Zimbabwe: On 24 August 2011, the Libyan embassy staff in Harare declared they would "follow the Libyan majority" and declare allegiance to the NTC, pulling down the green flag, raising the tricolour, and destroying portraits and posters of Muammar Gaddafi. On 25 August, Zimbabwe's Ministry of Foreign Affairs announced that country's government no longer recognised Libyan Ambassador Taher Elmagrahi because of his defection, and Elmagrahi may face expulsion from Zimbabwe. "We do not have diplomatic relations with NTC and the hoisting of its flag here is actually illegal," Foreign Affairs Secretary Joey Bimha said. Bimha said ZANU-PF, Zimbabwe's ruling party, refused to recognise the NTC because "Gaddafi remains the legitimate representative of the people of Libya." On 26 August, Foreign Minister Simbarashe Mumbengegwi declared Elmagrahi persona non grata and ordered him and his family to leave Zimbabwe within five days. On 1 September, Zimbabwean police arrested foreign journalists in the Libyan embassy. The next day, staff of the embassy of Libya sought refuge in Botswana. The expulsion broke the fragile coalition between Robert Mugabe and the Prime Minister Morgan Tsvangirai, who said: "My position is it is not up to Zimbabwe to decide what the sovereign right is of the Libyans. It is up to the Libyans to choose their representatives." On 15 September, the Deputy Minister of Foreign Affairs, Robert Makhula said that Libyan ambassador and his staff were not expelled, but "simply asked to go back to Libya and receive credentials from the new authority since the NTC had no diplomatic mandate at this stage to assign ambassadors to other countries".

=== Countries that abstained at the UNGA ===
- Antigua and Barbuda
- Cameroon
- Dominican Republic
- El Salvador
- Indonesia: On 22 August, Libyan embassy "members shifted their loyalty en masse from Gaddafi to the rebel-led National Transitional Council (NTC)". On 23 August, Foreign Affairs Minister Marty Natalegawa said that he hailed the choice made by the people of Libya. On 3 September, FM said in a statement that "Indonesia supports the National Transition Council's efforts to roll out a democratic transition in a peaceful manner". On 21 October, Helmi Fauzi, one of the members of the Indonesian People's Consultative Assembly urged the government of President Susilo Bambang Yudhoyono to recognise NTC.
- Nepal
- Saint Vincent and the Grenadines: On 30 September, St. Vincent and the Grenadines foreign minister Douglas Slater said that its government decided to put its relations with Libya "on hold" until it could be satisfied that "there is a legitimate, proper established government".
- Suriname
- Trinidad and Tobago
- Uruguay

=== UN members that were absent for the vote ===
- Belarus: On 22 August 2011, the Libyan embassy in Minsk lowered the green flag and raised the tricolour adopted by the NTC.
- Bhutan
- Burundi
- Cambodia
- Republic of the Congo
- North Korea: On 30 August 2011, an official of North Korean embassy in Libya answered on the question about recognition that Pyongyang must "wait and see" to recognise NTC.
- Dominica
- Grenada
- Guyana
- Haiti
- Kiribati
- Kyrgyzstan
- Laos
- Liberia: On 14 June 2011, Liberian president Ellen Johnson-Sirleaf announced that "the Government of Colonel Gaddafi has lost the legitimacy to govern Libya", so the Liberian government decided to sever diplomatic relations with Libya by withdrawing its envoy in Tripoli and suspending the activity of the Libyan representation in Monrovia. She also added that they can be resumed when "the people of Libya reach a political settlement which offers the best hope of lasting peace".
- Marshall Islands
- Federated States of Micronesia
- Mozambique: On 24 August 2011, the Libyan embassy in Maputo raised the NTC flag over its buildings. At the beginning of September, the Libya national basketball team, in Mozambique at the All-Africa Games, and the Libya national football team, in Mozambique for 2012 Africa Cup of Nations qualification, were playing under the NTC flag.
- Myanmar
- Nauru
- Palau
- Papua New Guinea
- Saint Kitts and Nevis
- Samoa
- Sierra Leone: On 11 June 2011, the opposition party People's Democratic League called on "government of Sierra Leone, led by President Ernest Bai Koroma to state publicly Sierra Leonean peoples solidarity and support for Libya against NATO terrorism" and not to recognise NTC. On 30 August, the Libyan embassy in Freetown pulled down the green flag of Libya, but did not hoist the new flag, reflecting the policy propagated by the host country: government spokesperson Silvester Swareh said that "this government upholds and stands by any decision that the AU takes".
- Solomon Islands
- Tajikistan
- Tonga
- Turkmenistan: The Libyan mission in Ashgabat defected from Gaddafi shortly after the start of the Battle of Tripoli. The head diplomat expressed support for the NTC and the revolution.
- Tuvalu
- Uzbekistan

=== Other non-UN member governments ===
- Sahrawi Arab Democratic Republic: On 26 August 2011, the Sahrawi government and the Polisario Front issued a joint statement rebutting claims that 556 Polisario mercenaries were arrested in Libya, blaming the report on Moroccan propaganda. The statement asked "the new Libyan authorities, represented by the Transitional National Council", to immediately disavow the claims.

=== International organisations ===
Several international organisations formed a relationship with the National Transitional Council in Benghazi, and the NTC was formally accredited as Libya's legitimate representative by some of them.

- African Union: The AU repeatedly urged both sides in the civil war to exercise "restraint" and declared its opposition to violence as a means of resolving the conflict. A delegation of African heads of state representing the AU met with representatives of the rival governments of Gaddafi and the NTC in April 2011 to present a peace plan. Though Tripoli accepted the plan, the NTC rejected it over its failure to stipulate Gaddafi's relinquishment of power. The AU presented a new framework in early July with many of the same features of the rejected "roadmap", again calling for an immediate ceasefire and negotiations brokered by the United Nations and the AU ad hoc committee, which included Republic of the Congo President Denis Sassou Nguesso, Malian President Amadou Toumani Touré, Mauritanian President Mohamed Ould Abdel Aziz, South African President Jacob Zuma, and Ugandan President Yoweri Museveni. On 22 August, the African Union Commission recognised the NTC "as the country's legitimate representative". However, on 26 August, the AU Peace and Security Council reportedly decided that the AU would not recognise the NTC and would insist on the formation of a unity government that included Gaddafi loyalists. AU Commission Chairperson Jean Ping said on 29 August that "seat is waiting for [the NTC] in the African Union ... for the new Transitional Authorities", but it had to form a unity government first. He also disparaged recent alleged hate crimes against black people in Libya, saying, "The NTC seems to confuse black people with mercenaries." On 20 October, AU lifted its suspension of Libya's membership in the organisation and said that it "would set up a liaison office in Tripoli".
- Arab League: Reports indicated that the Arab League had been involved in a move by "a European leader close to Gaddafi" to encourage Gaddafi to leave Libya in return for him not being prosecuted for his actions against the population. The Arab League voted for a no-fly zone at a special meeting in Cairo. The National Transitional Council was said to have given its consent, and Amr Moussa, secretary general of the Arab League had been speaking to the National Transitional Council's head, Mustafa Abdul Jalil, for the first time. Following a special meeting of foreign ministers held on 12 March 2011, the Arab League voted to ask the United Nations to establish a no-fly zone over Libya. The league also declared that the Gaddafi regime had "lost its legitimacy" and that it would instead "cooperate with the national council". Libya was suspended from the proceedings of the Arab League. On 23 August, the Arab League decided to give Libya a seat at its next meeting, which Secretary-General Naril Elaraby offered to the NTC "as the legitimate representative of the Libyan people" two days later. On 27 August, the Arab League, at its meeting of Foreign ministers in Cairo and in presence of the NTC's number two, Prime Minister and de facto Foreign Minister Mahmoud Jibril, formally readmitted Libya, turning over the country's seat to the NTC and effectively recognising the hitherto rebel body as the legitimate authority in Libya.
- Bolivarian Alliance for the Americas: President of Venezuela Hugo Chavez invited to Caracas on 9 September 2011 countries of the BAA "to draft a statement likely opposing the rebel-led reconstruction." On 9 September, the members decided to recognise only Gaddafi as the legitimate representative of Libya.
- Caribbean Community: On 24 October 2011, CARICOM Chairman Denzil L. Douglas, the prime minister of St. Kitts and Nevis, acknowledged "the People of Libya" as being "presently led by the interim National Transitional Council (NTC)".
- European Union: EU leaders at a summit expressed political backing for the Libyan National Council. The Commission President José Manuel Barroso stated that "The problem has a name: Gaddafi. He must go". EU leaders also announced it would cut off all ties with Gaddafi and would instead deal with the council. After a meeting between President Clinton and representatives of the council, the EU and the U.S decided to talk to the council without officially recognising them, in order to seek further information on the group and its goals. During his visit to Benghazi on 11 May 2011, Polish Foreign Minister Radosław Sikorski said that the EU recognised the interim rebel council as a "legitimate interlocutor". The visit was agreed with EU foreign policy chief Catherine Ashton. According to Polish Ministry of Foreign Affairs, the Libyan Interim Transitional National Council is "recognized by the European Union and a vast majority of the international community as the right partner for political contacts in Libya." On 22 May, EU High Representative Catherine Ashton opened the EU Office in Benghazi and met with the chairman of the transitional National Council, Mustafa Abdul Jalil.
- Gulf Cooperation Council: The GCC has issued a statement that Gaddafi and his regime has lost legitimacy and that the GCC would form a relationship with the National Transitional Council.
- International Monetary Fund: At the weekly IMF news conference on 26 August 2011, Spokesman David Hawley informed reporters that the Fund was monitoring the situation in Libya and that "When there is a clear, broad-based international recognition of a new government in Libya, it's at that point that the Fund could or would move toward recognition... The nature of our engagement going forward will depend on the wishes of any internationally recognised government in the country. So to underline, we're following events". Christine Lagarde said on 10 September that the "IMF membership recognized the National Transition Council as the new government of Libya."
- Organisation of Islamic Cooperation: On 22 June 2011, OIC sent a delegation to Benghazi and Tripoli to hold consultations with fighting sides. On 13 July, OIC sent another delegation "to hold talks with the National Transitional Council in Benghazi." On 25 August, IOC delegation took part in the fifth meeting of Libya Contact Group, where "participants ... agreed to deal with the National Transitional Council as the legitimate governing authority in Libya". In a speech on 3 September, Secretary General Ekmeleddin İhsanoğlu said the OIC recognised the NTC "as the only legitimate authority in Libya".
- Organization of Petroleum Exporting Countries: On 6 September, Dow Jones Newswires appeared an article reporting that OPEC members are waiting on United Nations resolution to recognise NTC as legitimate government, which they did on 19 September.
- United Nations: A press release issued by Secretary-General Ban Ki-moon on 26 August 2011 made references to the "new Libyan authorities" and stated that $1.5 billion in Gaddafi regime assets would be released to "the authorities Transitional National Council (TNC)". Deputy Secretary-General Asha-Rose Migiro also made references to "the new leadership". A further press release issued on 30 August 2011 made references to "Libya's transitional authorities". Following a meeting between senior members of the NTC and Ian Martin, the representative of the Secretary-General for post-conflict planning in Libya, the official press release again referred to the NCT as "the new Libyan authorities". The General Assembly voted by a tally of 114 for and 17 against to give Libya's UN seat to the NTC on 16 September. The General Assembly's Credentials Committee had earlier recommended that the NTC's credentials to the seat be accepted. Angola led the resistance to the NTC's recognition, arguing that proper process had not been followed in the presentation and acceptance of the NTC's credentials. Venezuela and Bolivia also opposed the NTC's recognition. Egypt, Libya's eastern neighbour, supported the recognition of the NTC.
- World Bank: On 13 September 2011, the Bank released a statement announcing that "it is engaging with the National Transitional Council as the Government of Libya".
- World Organization of Libyan Jews: On 17 July 2011, the group of 200,000 Jewish refugees and ex-refugees from Libya, most of whom now reside in Israel, sent a letter to National Transitional Council Chairman Mustafa Abdul Jalil recognising the council as the legitimate government of Libya. The group appointed established NTC proponent David Gerbi, an Italian Libyan, as its permanent representative in Benghazi, though Abdul Jalil asked that Gerbi postpone his arrival in Benghazi "until the end of the revolution". The Italian foreign ministry reported that the letter was "well received" by the NTC. Gerbi visited the Nafusa Mountains in August and September, where he was received by Amazigh representatives, and was reportedly planning to meet with Abdul Jalil in Tripoli later in the month.

=== Individuals ===
The following individuals expressed their support for the council:

- Ibrahim Al-Dabashi, Deputy Libyan ambassador to the U.N, stated that he is now representing the National Transitional Council.
- Mohammed El Senussi, Pretender to the Libyan Throne, stated that he supports the National Transitional Council as long as they continue to act in the best interest of the Libyan people.
- Yusuf al-Qaradawi, Egyptian Islamist Sheikh, declared his support for the rebels led by the Council in the 2011 Libyan civil war, urging Arab nations to recognise the Council and "to confront the tyranny of the regime in Tripoli". He suggested weapons be sent to the rebels to assist them, and said "Our Islamic nation should stand against injustice and corruption and I urge the Egyptian government to extend a helping hand to Libyan people and not to Gaddafi."

== See also ==
- International reactions to the 2011 Libyan civil war
- Libya Contact Group
- List of states with limited recognition
- London Conference on Libya
- United Nations General Assembly Resolution 2758
