= National Forces Alliance =

Political party in Libya

National Forces Alliance تحالف القوى الوطنية Taḥalluf al-quwa al-waṭaniyya
- President: Vacant
- Secretary-general: Salaheddin El Bishari
- Founded: February 2012
- Ideology: Libyan nationalism Islamic democracy Economic liberalism Liberalism
- Political position: Big tent
- Colors: Red, black, green
- General National Congress: 39 / 200

Website
- http://nfalibya.org/

The National Forces Alliance (Arabic: تحالف القوى الوطنية, Taḥalluf al-quwa al-waṭaniyya) is a political alliance in Libya. The alliance was created in February 2012. It includes 58 political organisations, 236 NGOs, and more than 280 independents. The alliance has a predominantly liberal tendency.

== History ==
NFA was created in February 2012. On 14 March 2012, the former wartime prime-minister, Mahmoud Jibril, was elected president of the alliance. NFA competed in the Libyan General National Congress election, 2012. It fielded 70 candidates across Libya. Bucking the Islamist trend set by the Muslim Brotherhood's victories in Egyptian and Tunisian elections, the NFA beat out the Justice and Construction Party (Muslim Brotherhood's political arm in Libya) to take first place. NFA received 48% of the popular vote and won 39 of the 80 party-list seats. It is also estimated that 25 of the 120 independents in the GNC are associated with the NFA. Two NFA deputies were subsequently removed from the GNC by the integrity commission due to them having served as officials under the Gaddafi regime. On 14 November 2012, NFA became the largest governmental political party.

== Leadership ==
The leader represents the alliance in the political conversations, parliament or others. The general secretariat acts like the alliance's governing body. Former interim prime-minister, Mahmoud Jibril is the leader of NFA. Abdul Rahman Al Shater was the secretary-general. As of 3 October 2012, the secretary-general is Salaheddin El Bishari.

== Ideology ==
The NFA is widely considered towards the more liberal end of the political spectrum, but it does not describe itself as secularist. It has pledged to run the country as a "civil democratic" state, which respects minority groups, non-Muslims and foreigners. It doesn't believe the country should be run entirely by Sharia law, but does hold that Sharia should be "the main inspiration for legislation." NFA is eager to play down the "liberal" label in order not to scare off religious Libyans. Jibril denied the classification of the NFA as liberal, but stressed its heterogeneous composition and moderate positioning. He described the NFA as a moderate Islamic movement that recognises the importance of Islam in political life. A study by the German Institute for International and Security Affairs claims that "while perceived by some observers as 'liberal,' Mahmoud Jibril’s National Forces Alliance is in fact an unideological rallying point for parts of the establishment."The study further explains that what NFA deputies "have in common is belonging to an economically privileged class and prominent families. Well-known representatives of the former exiled opposition are absent; instead the NFA builds on prominent local figures." The study argues that "The Alliance can best be understood as an unideological electoral coalition of those parts of the elites that remained in Libya during the Gaddafi era, and for this reason had to find some kind of accommodation with the regime."

On the economy, the NFA favors globalization and attracting foreign investment. It supports privatization in principle, but says that Libya needs to first rebuild its infrastructure. It backs the idea of introducing minimum wage and expanding the Libyan social security system. NFA favors the creation of special economic zones along Libya's borders. From 2007 to early 2011, Jibril served in the Gaddafi regime as head of the National Planning Council of Libya and of the National Economic Development Board of Libya (NEDB). While there, he was a protégé of Saif al-Islam Gaddafi and promoted privatization and liberalization policies.

Many see Jibril's past association with the previous regime as an issue. German Institute for International and Security Affairs explains that "in line with its leaders’ own interests, the National Forces Alliance pursues a moderate line on the question of how comprehensively former regime officials should be excluded from politics and administration."

While against federalism, the NFA strongly supports the decentralization of certain areas of governance such as education, healthcare and transportation. The NFA also proposes a proportion of taxes collected specifically for local councils to utilize as they see fit.

On foreign policy, NFA secretary-general Krekshi said, "Definitely, we will be more open to cooperation with those countries who supported us in the revolution, but we will also deal with Russia and China as an interest of the state." According to a US 2011 diplomatic cable, "Jibril is a serious interlocutor who 'gets' the U.S. perspective."

== See also ==
- List of Islamic political parties
