= Ali Abd-al-Aziz al-Isawi =

Libyan politician

Deputy Prime Minister of Libya
- In office 23 March 2011 – 8 August 2011
- Preceded by: Position established
- Succeeded by: Ali Tarhouni

Personal details
- Born: 1966 (age 59–60) Benghazi, Libya
- Party: Anti-Gaddafi forces

Ali Abd-al-Aziz al-Isawi (Arabic: علي عبد العزيز العيساوي; born c. 1966) is a Libyan politician who is a leading figure of the National Transitional Council of Libya and was the vice-chairman of the executive board of the NTC until his dismissal along with the board's other ministers on 8 August 2011. He previously served as the Minister of Foreign Affairs for the NTC. He also was secretary of the General People's Committee of Libya (GPCO) for Economy, Trade, and Investment, and was the youngest minister to fill such a post. He was appointed to this post in January 2007. Before taking the ministerial position, he founded the Centre for Export Development in 2006 and became the first director general for it. He also assumed the position of director general for the Ownership expansion program (privatization fund) in 2005. He began his political career as a staff member and then as a diplomat in the Foreign Ministry until 2005.

On 28 November, NTC chief military prosecutor Yussef Al-Aseifr announced that Isawi had been named chief suspect in the killing of Abdul Fatah Younis, a senior military officer of the Gaddafi regime who had defected to the rebel side in the Libyan Civil War. Isawi denied involvement in the killing, saying he "never signed any decision relating to Abdel Fattah Younes."
