= Libyan nationalism =

Flag of Libya

Libyan nationalism refers to the nationalism of Libyans and Libyan culture. Libyan nationalism began to arise with the creation of the Senussi religious orders in the 1830s that blended North African Sufism with orthodox Islam. After colonization of Libya by Italy, opponents of Italian colonial rule from Tripolitania and Cyrenaica combined forces in 1922, with Senussi leader Omar Mukhtar leading the revolt against Italian forces in Libya. Libya became an independent state after World War II.

Libya under Muammar Gaddafi initially pursued pan-Arabism but later abandoned this; Gaddafi initiated an irredentist war with Chad over the Aouzou strip. Gaddafi was overthrown in 2011.

== History ==
=== Mid 19th Century ===
During the 1840s the Senussi religious orders reached the borders of Libya with the help of Algerian sheikh El-Sayyid Mohammed bin Ali Al-Senussi, also known as Grand Sanusi. The Senussi orders created a spiritual unification, a sense of community, among the Libyan people. The Senussi orders were concerned with the spiritual aspect of the religion of Islam. Their presence was detectable among the tribes in Libya which provided the religion with more power and influence in the region. They played an important part in creating cohesion among tribes and keeping the tribes at peace, preventing conflict. Within politics, the Senussi orders were concerned with spreading Islam's reach. They became more prominent in Libya to the point where we could eventually speak of a state within a state led by the Senussi order.

=== 20th Century ===
Since the 19th century, Italy had had colonial ambitions in Libya. In 1912, the European power invaded and annexed Tripolitania and Cyrenaica right after their recognition by the Turks through the Treaty of Lausanne. The power was shared between the Senussi orders and the Italian authorities in Libya. After the Senussi orders had sided with the Ottoman Empire during the war and lost, Muhammad Idris took the lead in the negotiations with the British. In 1922, the different nationalist groups in Tripoli decided to put their differences aside and recognized Idris as the legitimate leader of Libya. With his nomination, the war between the Senussi orders and the Italians started again. After another Italian victory, thousands of Italians immigrated to the Libyan soil. During World War II, Idris fled to Egypt where he was protected by the British. He finally rose to the throne when Libya was unified under a constitutional monarchy after the defeat of Italy and Germany.

King Muhammad Idris was overthrown in the 1969 coup led by Captain Muammar Gaddafi. Inspired by Nasser in Egypt, Gaddafi joined his project of regional unity, also called pan-Arabism, aiming at creating a common Arab state. In this project, Gaddafi viewed Islam as an essential pillar, hence approaching ideas of pan-Islamism. Islam worked as a unifying factor of universal relevance. Gaddafi wished to promote an alternative to the communism and capitalist philosophies in the Third International Theory. This theory, developed in The Green Book, was addressing not only the Arab world but the entire globe and promoted direct democracy through the General People's Committee establishing a direct dialogue between the population and the government.

=== 21st Century ===
With the failure of the pan-Arabism movement, Gaddafi turned to pan-Africanism. He was nominated president of the African Union in 2009 and exposed his ideas of continentalism; Gaddafi did not believe in the possibility of individually strong African states. He claimed that, to find their strength and be able to challenge greater powers, the African states had to unite. He also defended the establishment of a continental army as he argued that no state could flourish and prosper without one. During the Libyan Resistance Movement of 2011 Gaddafi was overthrown. After this, there was a lack of leadership and unity filled by the National Transitional Council and Non-State (Armed) Actors. The non-state (armed) actors played an important role in the state-building of Libya after 2011: they have provided the Libyan people with, among other things, security and social services.

== Long-Distance Nationalism ==
After the revolution of 1969 many Libyan nationals fled from Libya, resulting in the establishment of a Libyan diaspora across the world in North America, Europe and the MENA region, In particular, Libyan immigration to Tunisia is a long-term phenomenon. During the 2011 revolution, there was support for and part taking in the revolution by Libyan people across the world. The diaspora shared a common feeling of one nation, of connectedness and of belonging to one community. Social media was an important factor in making this possible.

== See also ==
- African nationalism
- Arab nationalism
- Egyptian nationalism
- Tunisian nationalism

== Bibliography ==
- Alunni, Alice. ''Long-Distance Nationalism and Belonging in the Libyan Diaspora''. British Journal of Middle Eastern Studies 46, no. 2 (March 2019): 242-58. https://doi.org/10.1080/13530194.2019.1569303.
- Badi, Emadeddin. ''Of Conflict and Collapse: Rethinking State Formation in Post-Gaddafi Libya''. Middle East Law and Governance 13, no. 1 (March 2021): 22-48.
- Baldinetti, Anna. The Origins of the Libyan Nation. Abingdon: Routledge, 2010.
- Deeb, Marius K. "Islam and Arab Nationalism in Al-Qaddhafi's Ideology". Journal of South Asian and Middle Eastern Studies 2, (Winter 1978): 12-26.
- Ladjal, Tarek. ''Tribe and State in the History of Modern Libya: A Khaldunian Reading of the Development of Libya in the Modern Era 1711-2011'', edited by Alexios Alecou. Cogent Arts & Humanities 3, no. 1 (December 2016): 1-17. https://doi.org/10.1080/23311983.2016.1183278.
- Motyl, Alexander J.. Encyclopedia of Nationalism. San Diego: Academic Press, 2001.
- Ntaka, Buyisile and László Csicsmann. ''Non-State Armed Groups and State-Building in the Arab Region: The Case of Post-Gaddafi Libya''. South African Journal of International Affairs 28, no. 4 (January 2022): 629-49. https://doi.org/10.1080/10220461.2021.2019104
- Ramutsindela, Maano. "Gaddafi, Continentalism and Sovereignty in Africa". South African Geographical Journal 91, no. 1 (February 2012): 1-3.
