= Abdurrahim El-Keib =

Libyan politician (1950–2020)

Abdurrahim El-Keib عبد الرحيم الكيب
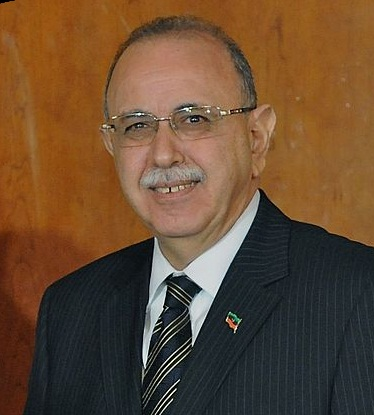

Prime Minister of Libya Acting
- In office 24 November 2011 – 14 November 2012
- President: Mustafa Abdul Jalil; Mohammed Ali Salim (Acting); Mohammed Magariaf
- Deputy: Mustafa Abushagur
- Preceded by: Ali Tarhouni (Acting)
- Succeeded by: Ali Zeidan

Personal details
- Born: 2 March 1950 Tripoli, British Administration of Tripolitania (now Libya)
- Died: 21 April 2020 (aged 70) Tuscaloosa, Alabama, United States
- Party: Independent
- Spouse: Mawia Kaddoura
- Education: University of Tripoli; University of Southern California; North Carolina State University

Abdurrahim Abdulhafiz El-Keib, PhD, (Arabic: عبد الرحيم عبد الحفيظ الكيب; also transcribed Abdel Rahim AlKeeb, Abdul Raheem Al-Keeb, etc.; 2 March 1950 – 21 April 2020) was a Libyan politician, professor of electrical engineering, and entrepreneur who served as interim Prime Minister of Libya from 24 November 2011 to 14 November 2012. He was appointed to the position by the country's National Transitional Council on the understanding that he would be replaced when the General National Congress was elected and took power. Power was handed to the Congress on 8 August 2012, and the assembly appointed El-Keib's successor Ali Zeidan in October 2012.

== Academic career ==
El-Keib moved to Los Angeles, California, where he earned his master's degree in electrical engineering from the University of Southern California in 1976; he then moved to Raleigh, North Carolina where he earned his doctorate from North Carolina State University in 1984. He joined the University of Alabama as an assistant professor of electrical engineering in 1985 and became professor in 1996. He has lectured at the University of Tripoli, North Carolina State University, and the University of Alabama. El-Keib, an expert in power system economics, planning and controls, and in strategic planning for higher education took leave from his tenured faculty position at Alabama to direct the Division of Electrical, Electronics, and Computer Engineering at the American University of Sharjah, United Arab Emirates from 1999 to 2001. In 2006 he left Alabama to chair the EE Department and to lead the effort to establish the graduate program at The Petroleum Institute in the UAE (where El-Keib remained until he joined the Libyan Transitional National Council as one of its representatives for Tripoli in 2011). He supervised many MSc theses and PhD dissertations on "capacitive compensation planning and operation for primary distribution feeders" and was the recipient of several teaching and research awards.

El-Keib did research in the area of Electrical Power Engineering and is an author of numerous research papers. His research was sponsored by the National Science Foundation (NSF), the Electric Power Research Institute (EPRI), the United States Department of Energy (US DoE), Southern Company Services (SC), and Alabama Power Company (APCO). He published numerous papers and research reports and a book chapter. His work on Emissions Constrained Dispatch and VoltlVar compensation on primary distribution feeders has been implemented by several companies in the United States. He also served as a consultant to several utility companies including Alabama Power Company and Southern Company Services.

He served as a member of the board of directors of the Arab Science and Technology Foundation from 2001 to 2007, a member of the Science and Technology Panel, the Islamic Development Bank, senior member of IEEE, associate editor for the IEEE Power Engineering Society Letters, 1992–2000, and the World Science and Engineering Academy and Society (WSEAS) Transactions on Power Systems, a member of the editorial advisory board of the Korean Institute of electrical Engineers (KIEE)/Society of Power Engineering, and of the advisory board of the International Journal of Innovations in Energy Systems and Power (IJESP).

In 2005, El-Keib founded the Libyan International Company for Energy and Technology.

== Community work ==
El-Keib lead the Islamic community during his two decades in Tuscaloosa, Alabama, and was involved in informal, inter-faith dialogue. He was married to Mawia Kaddoura, who taught at The University of Alabama, American university of Sharjah, The Petroleum Institute, and Al Hosn University. Her father served as a president of The University of Libya and later as a Senator during the reign of King Idris.

== Prime Minister of Libya ==
On 31 October 2011, El-Keib was named the interim prime minister of Libya after garnering 26 out of 51 votes from the Libyan National Transitional Council (NTC). Despite repeated clashes with the NTC, his Cabinet stayed in office through the national elections, which it held successfully in a transparent, free, and democratic manner.

=== Foreign policy ===
During his tenure as prime minister, El-Keib's time was largely dedicated to foreign policy. Libya has restored relationships with the United States, United Kingdom and other countries. El-Keib collaborated well with the United Nations and the European Union on issues of interest to Libya during that time, and also sought to collaborate with the Arab and Islamic world. In addition, he exerted serious effort to ensure the members of the African Union and other countries such as Russia, China and other southeastern Asian nations of Libya's interest to maintain mutually beneficial political, security, and economic relationships, and collaborations which are based on mutual respect and respect for national sovereignty and interests. His government called for and held a security conference that involved the ministers of defense and security in Libya's neighboring countries including Egypt, Sudan, Chad, Niger, Algeria, Tunisia, Morocco, Mauritania, and Mali. El-Keib addressed the African Union, the International Human Rights Organization, and the UN Security Council. He visited several important countries and received many foreign leaders in Tripoli to assure all that Libya was on the right track and making progress to hold national elections, Libya's first in almost fifty years including 42 years of dictatorship and moreover following a bloody revolution. His efforts were also useful in obtaining what was needed to increase the country's oil production, which reached a level of 1.6 million barrels per day (bpd) from about 200,000 bpd as well as the release of Libyan frozen funds.

== Personal life ==
El-Keib left Libya in 1976 and joined the Libyan opposition, and over the years worked to help finance the movement. From a prestigious family from Tripoli with roots and part of his family in Sabratha – a coastal town 70 kilometers (45 miles) west of Tripoli – during his exile, El-Keib would meet his family, who remained in Libya, during their mutual excursions to Tunis, Morocco, and elsewhere.

El-Keib died from a heart attack on 21 April 2020 at the age of 70.

Political offices
Preceded by Ali Tarhouni; Acting	Prime Minister of Libya; 2011–2012	Succeeded by Ali Zeidan
