= List of political parties in Libya =

== Parties with seats in the General National Congress ==
- National Forces Alliance
- Justice and Construction Party
- National Front Party
- Wadi al-Hiya Alliance
- Union for Homeland
- National Centrist Party
- Libyan National Democratic Party
- The Message
- The Foundation
- National Party for Development and Welfare
- Nation & Prosperity
- Authenticity & Renewal
- Authenticity & Progress
- Moderate Umma Assembly
- Libik Watani
- National Gathering of Wadi al-Shati
- Moderate Youth Party
- Libyan List for Freedom & Development
- National Coalition of Parties
- Libya the Hope
- Wisdom Party

== Other parties ==
- Taghyeer Party
- Libu Party
- Ensaf Movement
- Democratic Party
- Homeland Party
- Party of Reform and Development
- Libyan National Movement
- Popular Front for the Liberation of Libya
- Ihya Libya
- Libyan Constitutional Union
- Libyan Amazigh Congress
- Alhaq and Democracy Party of Benghazi
- Libyan National Congress Party
- New Libya Party
- National Unity of Libya Party
- Freedom and Development Party of Libya
- The Patriotic Reform Party
- National Solidarity Party
- The Libyan National Party
- Umma Party
- Justice and Democracy Party of Libya
- Libya Future Party
- Libyan Center Party
- National Democratic Assembly for Justice and Progress
- Libya Development Party
- Libyan Universal Party
- National Democratic Alliance
- New National Congress Party
- Tawasul Party
- Libyan National Democratic Party for Justice and Development
- Libya Our Home and Tribe Party
- Libyan Liberation Party
- Libya for All Party
- Unity Movement
- Democratic Youth Party
- National Democratic Assembly
- Wefaq Party
- Libyan National Democratic Assemblage
- Ansar Al Horria
- Libyan Unionist Party

== Banned parties ==
- Libyan Popular National Movement

== Defunct parties ==
- Arab Socialist Union
- Libyan Arab Socialist Ba'ath Party
- Libyan Communist Party
- Muslim Association of the Lictor
- National Front for the Salvation of Libya
- National Conference for the Libyan Opposition
- Libyan National Democratic Front
- Libyan Freedom and Democracy Campaign

== See also ==
- Lists of political parties
