= Anti-Gaddafi forces =

- The former Libyan flag used during the monarchy (1951–69) had been used by some protesters as an opposition symbol. After the war's conclusion, it once again became the flag of Libya.
- Active: February–October 2011
- Country: Libya
- Patron: France; United States; United Kingdom; Italy; Qatar
- Engagements: First Libyan Civil War; War in Darfur

The Anti-Gaddafi forces, also known as the Libyan opposition or Libyan rebels, were Libyan groups that opposed and militarily defeated the government of Muammar Gaddafi during the First Libyan Civil War in 2011, killing him in the process. The Anti-Gaddafi forces, who received backing from NATO and Qatar, were represented by the National Transitional Council and their National Liberation Army, which claimed to be the "only legitimate body representing the people of Libya and the Libyan state". These opposition forces included organized and armed militia groups, participants in the Libyan Civil War, Libyan diplomats who switched their allegiance from the Gaddafi-led government, and Libyan military units that switched sides to support the protesters.

== Political opposition ==
The following is a list of groups who self-proclaimed opposition to the rule of Gaddafi:

- National Transitional Council
- Tripoli Brigade
- Zintan Brigades
- Misrata Military Council
- Libyan Youth Movement
- Committee for Libyan National Action in Europe
- Libyan Freedom and Democracy Campaign
  - Democratic Party
- National Conference for the Libyan Opposition
  - Libyan League for Human Rights
  - National Front for the Salvation of Libya
  - Libyan Constitutional Union
  - Libyan Tmazight Congress
- Libyan Islamic Movement

== Armed opposition ==
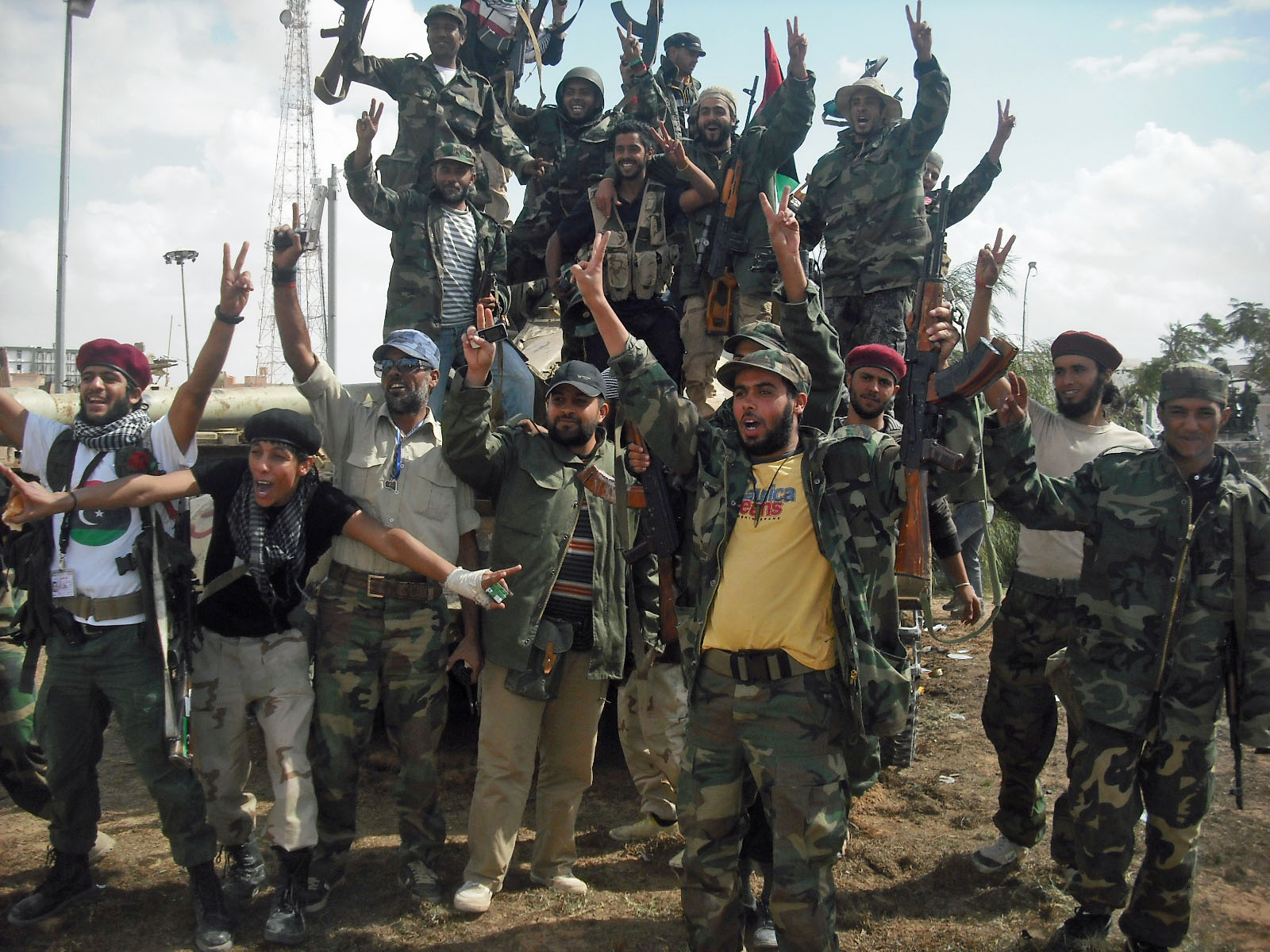
Libyan rebels after entering the town of Bani Walid.

=== Command and control ===
On 5 March 2011, opposition forces radio in Benghazi announced the creation of the National Transitional Council, a political body with 33 representatives from most Libyan regions. The Chairman of the Council is Mustafa Abdul Jalil, Abdul Hafiz Ghoga is the Vice-Chairman, and Mahmoud Jibril is the Chairman of the Executive Board. Omar El-Hariri was the head of military affairs until May 2011. Then later that month the position was renamed to Minister of Defense and Jalal al-Digheily was assigned to that position. On 8 August 2011, Jalala along with 14 other members of the Executive Board were fired, and the position left vacant but was reappointed in early October 2011 after continuing in the role of interim defense minister for almost two months.

The Commander-in-Chief was General Abdul Fatah Younis until his death in July 2011. Suleiman Mahmoud, Younis's top lieutenant, replaced him as army commander. Colonel Khalifa Haftar was another top military commander. The army was organized into brigades, with rebel fighters bearing identity cards.

=== Weapons and vehicles ===
The Libyan opposition was mainly using vehicles and weapons captured from government forces or depots. The opposition had only had access to T-55 tanks and a very small amount of T-72 tanks captured during the Second Battle of Benghazi. News coverage commonly showed rebels driving ordinary cars and technicals near battle areas. On 9 March 2011, a report from the International Institute for Strategic Studies said: "Apart from a few mechanized units in Benghazi and Tobruk, and a few armored battalions near Bayda, rebel-controlled areas lack any substantial hardware with which to take on the pro-Gaddafi stronghold of Tripoli." However, two fighter jets defected from Gaddafi and joined the rebels and were used during the Battle of Ajdabiya and damaged an armed oiler tanker and possibly two others. They also gained several helicopters from defected units based in Benghazi, these aircraft forming the Free Libyan Air Force. One of these aircraft, a Soviet-made MiG-23BN, was shown having been shot down in a friendly fire incident over Benghazi after it was mistaken for an enemy aircraft.

They had also captured a large number of ZU-23-2 and ZPU anti-aircraft guns, as well as rocket-propelled grenades, KPV 14.5×114mm Dshk machine guns, FN FAL, F2000 and AK-47 rifles, and FN MAG, AA-52 and PK machine guns. Britain sent 5,000 sets of body armor, 6,650 uniforms, and communication equipment to police in rebel-held areas.

In addition to conventional and improvised weapons, there was a surprising amount of sophistication among rebel equipment, with some even fashioning unmanned ground vehicles from remote-controlled toy cars and the like.

== Human rights violations ==
The government of Chad asked the NATO coalition forces to protect its citizens in rebel-held areas of Libya. The Chadian government claimed that dozens of its citizens were executed after being accused of being mercenaries for Gaddafi.

== See also ==
- Syrian opposition (2011–2024), similar faction
