= Canilhac =

Commune in Lozère, France

- Part of Banassac-Canilhac
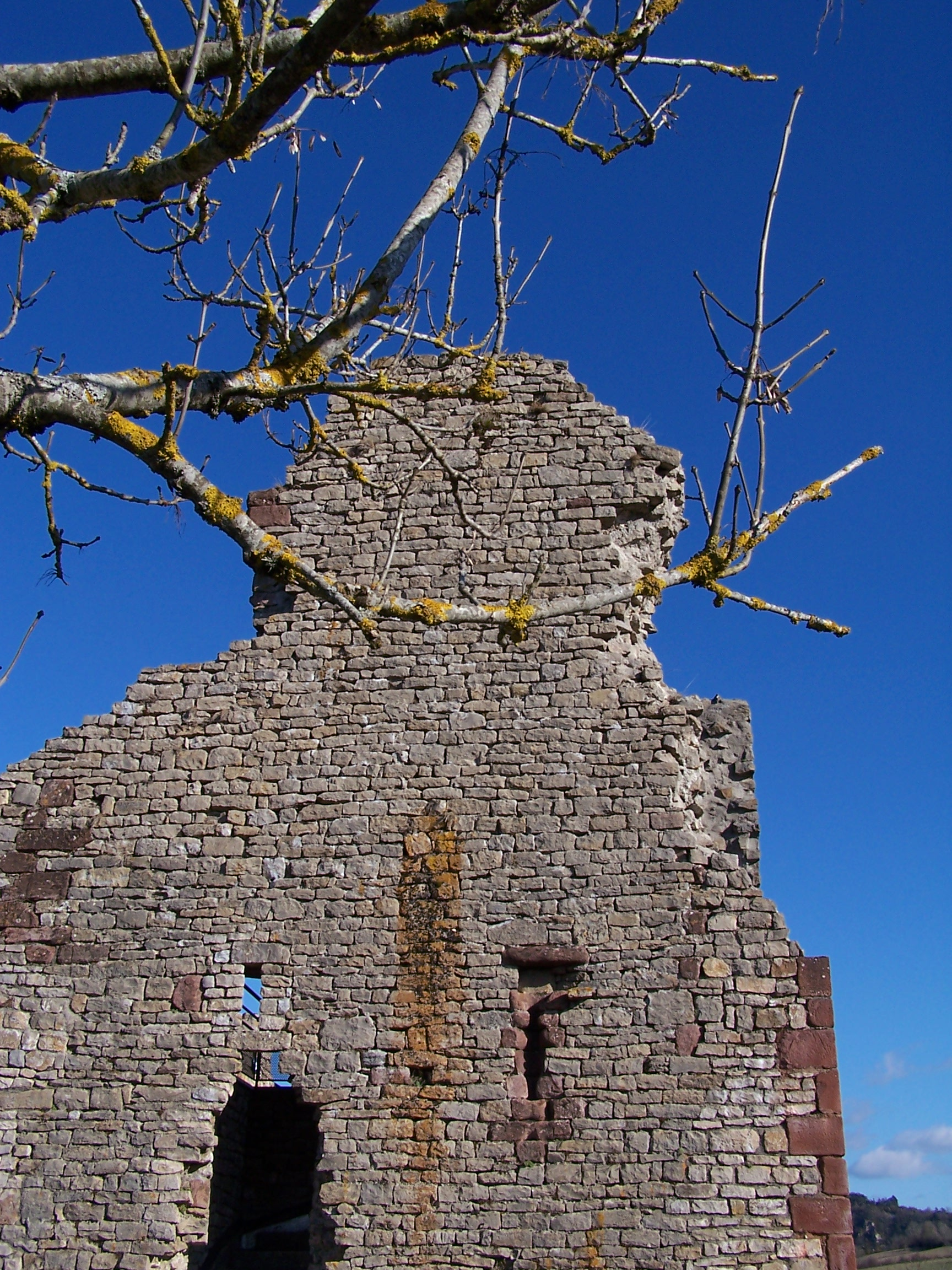
- The ruins of the château of Canilhac, in 2010

- Coat of arms
- Location of Canilhac
- Location within France Location within Occitanie
- Coordinates: 44°25′28″N 3°09′03″E
- Country: France
- Region: Occitania
- Department: Lozère
- Arrondissement: Mende
- Canton: La Canourgue
- Commune: Banassac-Canilhac
- Area^{1}: 7.27 km^{2} (2.81 sq mi)
- Elevation: 700 m (2,300 ft)
- Highest elevation: 940 m (3,080 ft)
- Lowest elevation: 499 m (1,637 ft)
- Population (2013): 164
  - Density: 22.6/km^{2} (58.4/sq mi)
- Time zone: UTC+01:00 (CET)
  - Summer (DST): UTC+02:00 (CEST)
- Postal code: 48500
- ^{1} French Land Register data, which excludes lakes, ponds, glaciers > 1 km^{2} (0.386 sq mi or 247 acres) and river estuaries.

Canilhac (French pronunciation: [kanijak]) is a former commune in the Lozère department in southern France. On 1 January 2016, it was merged into the new commune of Banassac-Canilhac. Its population was 164 in 2013.

== See also ==
- Communes of the Lozère department
