= Le Massegros =

- Part of Massegros Causses Gorges
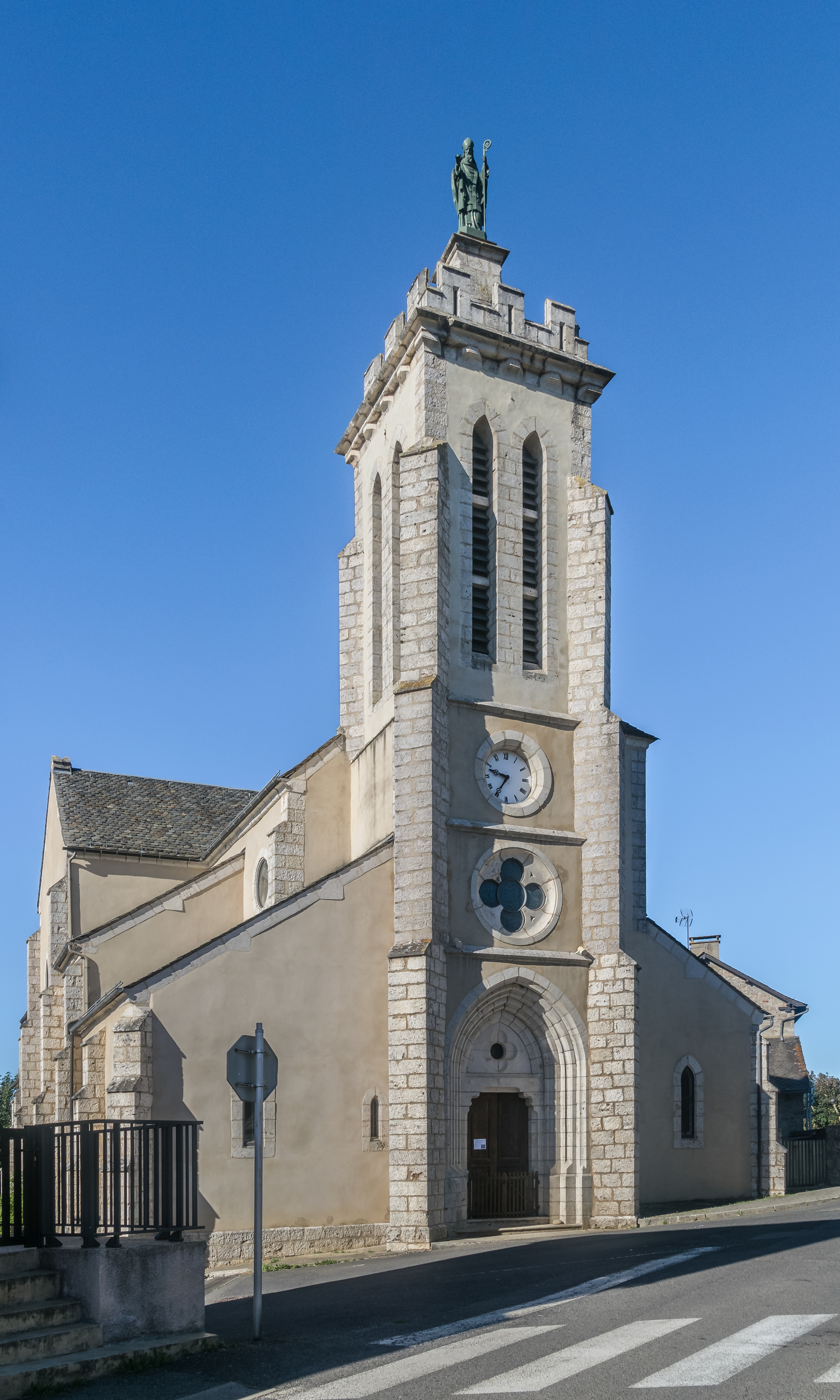
- Saint Martin Church in Le Massegros

- Coat of arms
- Location of Le Massegros
- Location within France Location within Occitanie
- Coordinates: 44°18′35″N 3°10′31″E
- Country: France
- Region: Occitania
- Department: Lozère
- Arrondissement: Florac
- Canton: La Canourgue
- Commune: Massegros Causses Gorges
- Area^{1}: 17.94 km^{2} (6.93 sq mi)
- Elevation: 860 m (2,820 ft)
- Highest elevation: 1,005 m (3,297 ft)
- Lowest elevation: 815 m (2,674 ft)
- Population (2022): 400
  - Density: 22/km^{2} (58/sq mi)
- Time zone: UTC+01:00 (CET)
  - Summer (DST): UTC+02:00 (CEST)
- Postal code: 48500
- ^{1} French Land Register data, which excludes lakes, ponds, glaciers > 1 km^{2} (0.386 sq mi or 247 acres) and river estuaries.

Le Massegros (Occitan: Lo Mas Sagran) is a former commune in the Lozère department in southern France. On 1 January 2017, it was merged into the new commune Massegros Causses Gorges.

== See also ==
- Communes of the Lozère department
