= Le Recoux =

- Part of Massegros Causses Gorges
- Coat of arms
- Location of Le Recoux
- Location within France Location within Occitanie
- Coordinates: 44°20′20″N 3°08′53″E
- Country: France
- Region: Occitania
- Department: Lozère
- Arrondissement: Florac
- Canton: La Canourgue
- Commune: Massegros Causses Gorges
- Area^{1}: 23.69 km^{2} (9.15 sq mi)
- Elevation: 870 m (2,850 ft)
- Highest elevation: 1,016 m (3,333 ft)
- Lowest elevation: 788 m (2,585 ft)
- Population (2022): 128
  - Density: 5.40/km^{2} (14.0/sq mi)
- Time zone: UTC+01:00 (CET)
  - Summer (DST): UTC+02:00 (CEST)
- Postal code: 48500
- ^{1} French Land Register data, which excludes lakes, ponds, glaciers > 1 km^{2} (0.386 sq mi or 247 acres) and river estuaries.

Le Recoux (Occitan: Lo Recós, or more often, Al Recós) is a former commune in the Lozère department in southern France. On 1 January 2017, it was merged into the new commune Massegros Causses Gorges. Its population was 128 in 2022.

== See also ==
- Communes of the Lozère department
