= Banassac =

Commune in Lozère, France

- Part of Banassac-Canilhac
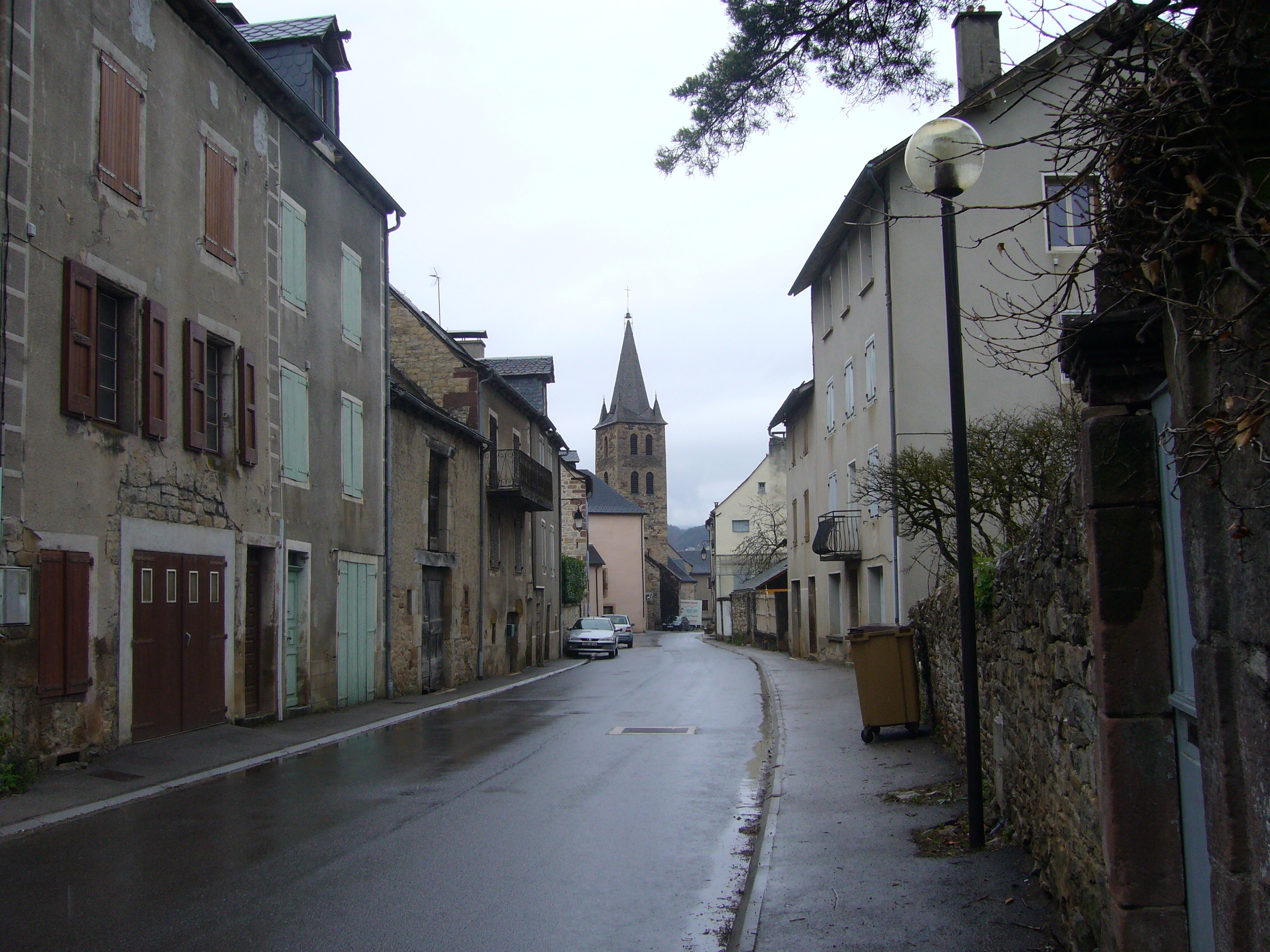
- A road in the centre of the commune

- Coat of arms
- Location of Banassac
- Location within France Location within Occitanie
- Coordinates: 44°26′13″N 3°12′03″E
- Country: France
- Region: Occitania
- Department: Lozère
- Arrondissement: Mende
- Canton: La Canourgue
- Commune: Banassac-Canilhac
- Area^{1}: 17.41 km^{2} (6.72 sq mi)
- Elevation: 530 m (1,740 ft)
- Highest elevation: 927 m (3,041 ft)
- Lowest elevation: 504 m (1,654 ft)
- Population (2013): 872
  - Density: 50.1/km^{2} (130/sq mi)
- Time zone: UTC+01:00 (CET)
  - Summer (DST): UTC+02:00 (CEST)
- Postal code: 48500
- ^{1} French Land Register data, which excludes lakes, ponds, glaciers > 1 km^{2} (0.386 sq mi or 247 acres) and river estuaries.

Banassac (French pronunciation: [banasak]; Occitan: Banaçac) is a former commune in the Lozère department in southern France. On 1 January 2016, it was merged into the new commune of Banassac-Canilhac.

== Population ==
Historical population

| Year | Pop. | ±% p.a. |
|---|---|---|
| 1846 | 1,500 | — |
| 1851 | 1,294 | −2.91% |
| 1856 | 1,188 | −1.69% |
| 1861 | 1,173 | −0.25% |
| 1866 | 1,276 | +1.70% |
| 1872 | 1,228 | −0.64% |
| 1876 | 1,256 | +0.57% |
| 1881 | 1,393 | +2.09% |
| 1886 | 1,275 | −1.75% |
| 1891 | 1,158 | −1.91% |
| 1896 | 1,080 | −1.38% |
| 1901 | 964 | −2.25% |
| 1906 | 1,127 | +3.17% |
| 1911 | 1,110 | −0.30% |

| Year | Pop. | ±% p.a. |
|---|---|---|
| 1921 | 975 | −1.29% |
| 1926 | 888 | −1.85% |
| 1931 | 876 | −0.27% |
| 1936 | 782 | −2.24% |
| 1946 | 721 | −0.81% |
| 1954 | 624 | −1.79% |
| 1962 | 642 | +0.36% |
| 1968 | 599 | −1.15% |
| 1975 | 741 | +3.09% |
| 1982 | 799 | +1.08% |
| 1990 | 747 | −0.84% |
| 1999 | 813 | +0.95% |
| 2006 | 863 | +0.86% |
| 2013 | 872 | +0.15% |

Source: EHESS and INSEE

== See also ==
- Communes of the Lozère department
