= Lasvignes =

Lasvignes is a surname. Notable people with the surname include:

- Cristina Lasvignes (born 1978), Spanish television presenter, radio broadcaster, journalist and businessperson
- Serge Lasvignes (1954–2025), French government official, president of the Centre Pompidou (2015–2021)

== See also ==
- Les Vignes, a former commune in the Lozère department in southern France
