= National Gathering =

National Gathering may refer to several things:

- National Rally, a French far-right political party
- National Gathering (Serbia), a former Serbian far-right political coalition
- Nasjonal Samling, a former Norwegian far-right political party led by Vidkun Quisling
- National Gathering of Wadi al-Shati, a political party in Libya
- Homeland Party (Libya) under its provisional name National Gathering for Freedom, Justice and Development, an Islamist political party in Libya
