= Mohammed Magariaf =

Libyan politician (born 1940)

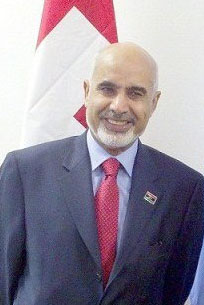
- Magariaf in 2012

Head of State of Libya
- In office 9 August 2012 – 28 May 2013
- Prime Minister: Abdurrahim El-Keib; Ali Zeidan
- Preceded by: Mohammed Ali Salim
- Succeeded by: Giuma Ahmed Atigha

President of the General National Congress
- In office 9 August 2012 – 28 May 2013
- Deputy: Juma Ahmad Atigha
- Preceded by: Mohammed Ali Salim (a.i.)
- Succeeded by: Giuma Ahmed Atigha (a.i.)
Additional offices
Secretary General of the National Front for the Salvation of Libya
In office May 1982 – 5 August 2001
Succeeded by	Ibrahim Abdulaziz Sahad
Ambassador of Libya to India
In office 1977 – 31 July 1980

Member of the General National Congress
- In office 8 August 2012 – 5 April 2016
- Preceded by: Congress established
- Succeeded by: Congress abolished
- Constituency: Ajdabiya

Personal details
- Born: Mohamed Yousef el-Magariaf; 9 May 1940 (age 86) Benghazi, Italian Libya
- Party: National Front Party (2012–present)
- Other political affiliations: National Front for the Salvation of Libya (1981–2012)
- Education: University of Benghazi
- Website: Official website

Mohammed Yousef el-Magariaf (also written as Magariaf, Elmegaryaf or Almegaryaf) or, as he writes on his official website, Dr. Mohamed Yusuf Al Magariaf (Arabic: محمد يوسف المقريف; born 9 May 1940) is a Libyan politician who served as the President of the General National Congress from its first meeting in August 2012 until his resignation in May 2013. In this role he was effectively Libya's de facto head of state, until his resignation in May 2013.

Magariaf is the leader of the National Front Party, which won three seats in the 2012 election, and he was previously well known for having founded and been the first leader of the National Front for the Salvation of Libya against the regime of Muammar Gaddafi.

== Early life and education ==
Magariaf was born 9 May 1940 in Benghazi.

A resident of Benghazi, he studied Economics at the University of Benghazi.

== Early career ==
He served from 1972 to 1977 as head of the board of auditors at the Libyan Arab Republic's Revenue Court, where he proved uncomfortable for the regime because of his anti-corruption stance and was subsequently designated Libya's Ambassador to India. After being recalled to Libya in 1980, he announced his defection in Morocco due to his certainty that he would be purged on return. He survived at least three assassination attempts.

=== With the NFSL: 1984–2011 ===
On 8 May 1984, el-Magariaf directed commandos from the National Front for the Salvation of Libya led by Ahmed Ibrahim Ihwas in an attempt to assassinate Muammar Gaddafi, via an attack on Gaddafi's headquarters. The attack failed. Al-Magariaf, the "National Front for the Salvation of Libya" broadcast opposition propaganda into Libya. Magariaf dedicated himself to overthrowing the Libyan Arab Jamahiriya with violence. In response, Gaddafi later targeted Al-Magariaf. Subsequent to the founding of the National Front for the Salvation of Libya, el-Magariaf is one of few people who knew he was targeted by Gaddafi's bombing of UTA Flight 772 in 1989.

The NFSL was founded in 1981, as the first opposition group pushing for democratic reforms in Libya. The NFSL called for a democratic government with constitutional guarantees, free and fair elections, free press, separation of powers, non-discriminatory rule of law, gender equality, multi-partyism, sustainable development, and a realistic democratic road-map that benefits from Libyan, Arab and Islamic traditions as well as democratic learning from Nelson Mandela's democratisation experience from South Africa, amongst others. At the onset of the Libyan Civil War, Magariaf remained active in engaging with his political contacts, in an effort to gain international support for himself and the Libyan people.

== Political career ==
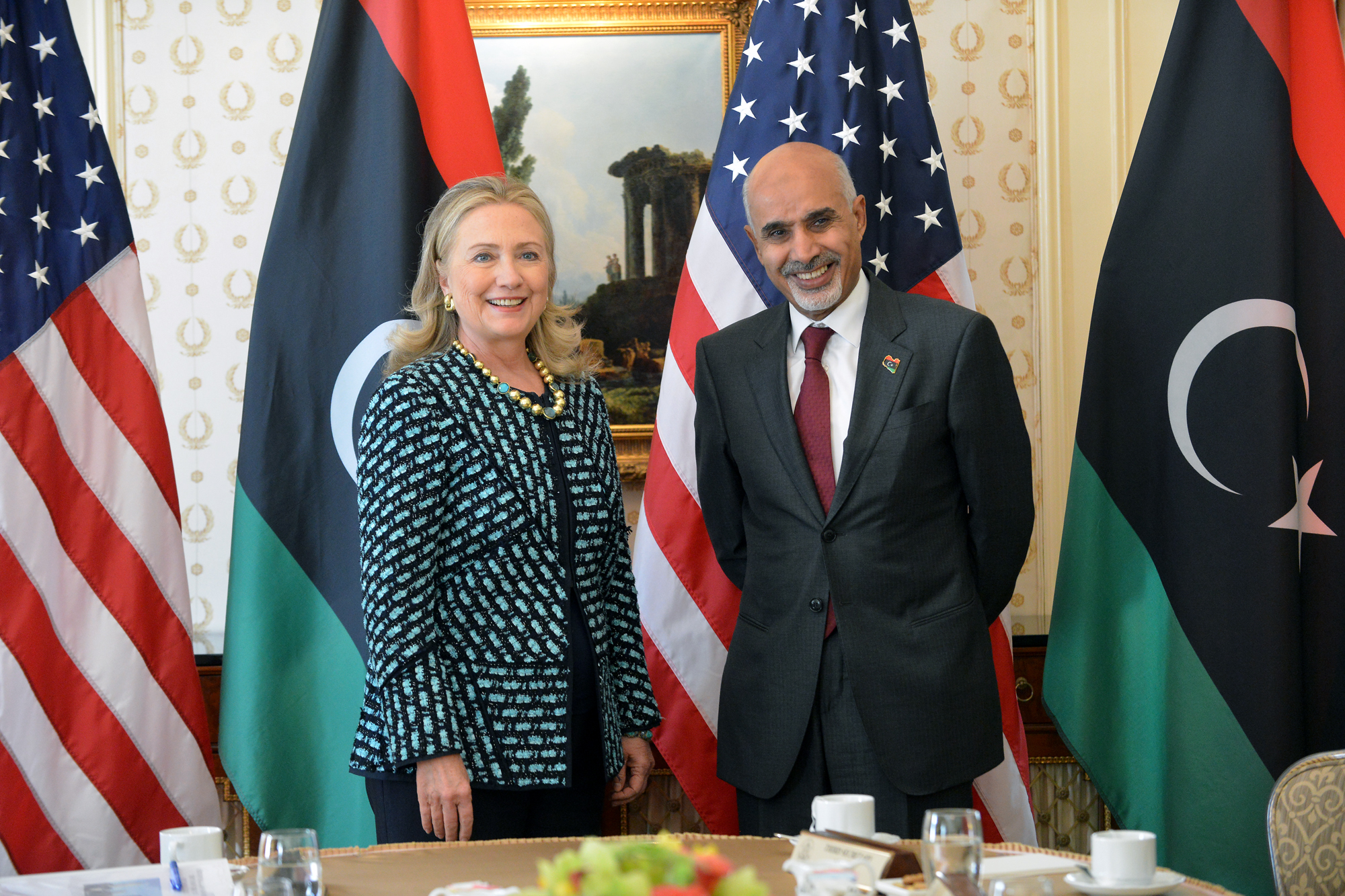
Magariaf, alongside former U.S. Secretary of State Hillary Clinton.

After the 2011 civil war, Magariaf returned to Libya from the United States, where he had spent most of his 30 years in exile. He is now the leader of National Front Party, the formal successor of the NFSL which was dissolved on 9 May 2012, after the National Transitional Council seized power. Magariaf is Fellow of the Institute of Chartered Accountants in England and Wales.

During the Libyan Congressional election of 2012, Magariaf was elected congressman, within the National Front Party.

=== Presidency of the General National Congress ===
Magariaf was elected President of the General National Congress (GNC) on 9 August 2012. He received 113 votes in Congress against 85 votes for his independent rival, Ali Zeidan who went on to become Prime Minister in November. After serving as President for 9 months he resigned in May 2013 in anticipation of the political isolation law which was passed, barring him from office due to his previous role as an ambassador under the Gaddafi regime.

=== Assassination attempt ===
Magariaf survived an attempt on his life in the southwestern Libyan town of Sabha on 4 January 2013. He had been visiting the town with a GNC delegation as part of a fact-finding mission aimed at helping the government restore security and crack down on smuggling operations in the south of the country. Magarief told reporters that his hotel was attacked by gunmen, triggering a three-hour gun battle with his personal bodyguards in which three of them were injured. Magarief escaped the incident unharmed.

== Political ideology ==
Magariaf is reported to have good relations with the Muslim Brotherhood, yet is perceived as a moderate pragmatist who led one of the most liberal parties in the 2012 election. His agenda is to focus on the Libyan economy.

== Sources ==
- Banks, Arthur S., Thomas C. Muller, and William Overstreet. Political Handbook of the World 2008, CQ Press, 2008.
- International Security Council, Global affairs, Volume 1, Issues 3-4, 1986, pp. 56–59.
- International Strategic Studies Association, Defense & foreign affairs handbook, 2002 - Technology & Engineering
- Metz, Helen Chapin (1987). "LIBYA: a country study, Chapter 4. Government and Politics: Opposition to Qadhafi: Exiled Opposition". Federal Research Division, Library of Congress.
- Vandewalle, Dirk (2006). History of Modern Libya. Cambridge University Press.

Party political offices
New office	Leader of the National Front Party; 2012	Succeeded by Mohamed Ali Darrat; Acting
Political offices
Preceded by Mohammed Ali Salim; Acting	President of the General National Congress of Libya; 2012–2013	Succeeded by Giuma Ahmed Atigha; Acting
Military offices
New title	Commander-in-Chief of the Libyan National Army; 2012–2013	Succeeded by Giuma Ahmed Atigha
