= 1984 Libyan coup attempt =

Coup attempt in Libya

Date	8 May 1984
Location	Bab al-Azizia compound, Tripoli, Libya
Result	Libyan government victory

Belligerents
National Front for the Salvation of Libya	Libya

Commanders and leaders
Ahmed Ibrahim Ihwas (POW)	(History of Libya under Muammar Gaddafi) Muammar Gaddafi

Strength
8 commandos	unknown

Casualties and losses
- 80 killed

The 1984 Libyan coup attempt was an armed assault on the Bab al-Azizia barracks in Tripoli on 8 May 1984, aimed at overthrowing Libyan leader Muammar Gaddafi. A group of around 20 to 30 gunmen attacked the heavily fortified compound that served as Gaddafi's residence, using rocket-propelled grenades and automatic weapons. After several hours of fighting, Libyan security forces repelled the attackers, killing all of them according to official accounts. The National Front for the Salvation of Libya (NFSL), an opposition group led by former diplomat Mohammed Yusef al-Maghariaf, claimed responsibility. In the subsequent crackdown, the Libyan government arrested up to 3,000 people and executed at least seven without trial.

== Background ==
Muammar Gaddafi had ruled Libya since the 1969 coup that overthrew the monarchy. His regime faced numerous coup attempts and plots, including a major rebellion by the Ninth Infantry Brigade in Tobruk in October 1980, which was suppressed with the help of East German security personnel. The National Front for the Salvation of Libya (NFSL) was founded in 1980 by Mohammed Yusef al-Maghariaf, a former Libyan diplomat, and was one of the several opposition groups that were operating abroad. The NFSL had previously refused to disclose its base of operations for security reasons.

In early 1984, relations between Libya and the United Kingdom deteriorated sharply after the fatal shooting of British police constable Yvonne Fletcher from inside the Libyan embassy in London on 17 April. The UK severed diplomatic ties with Libya, and the incident fueled mutual accusations. Diplomats reported growing dissatisfaction within Libya over economic difficulties, the public hangings of two dissident students at Al Fateh University, and the increasing influence of revolutionary committees.

In the weeks preceding the coup attempt, a series of sabotage operations struck Libya. Fires were set at two supermarkets in protest against Gaddafi’s unpopular nationalization of retail stores, and the main auditorium at Fatah University was set ablaze in retaliation for the hanging of the two students. There were also persistent reports that saboteurs were responsible for huge explosions at the army’s main arms and ammunition dump 35 miles (56 kilometres) southwest of Benghazi on the night of 24 March 1984. Libyan officials later confirmed that these incidents were carried out by the very same group that mounted the May 8 attack. The authorities responded with increased security measures, including the patrolling of city streets.

== Attack ==
At approximately 7:00 a.m. on 8 May 1984, a group of 20 to 30 gunmen assaulted the Bab al-Azizia barracks on the southern outskirts of Tripoli, a heavily fortified compound protected by electrified fences, bunkers and guard towers that served as Gaddafi's residence. The attackers were armed with rocket-propelled grenades and automatic weapons. It was unclear whether Gaddafi was inside the compound at the time of the assault.

Libyan troops responded with armored vehicles and machine-gun fire, forcing the gunmen to retreat into a nearby three-story building. Military police surrounded the building, and fighting continued until early afternoon. The official Libyan news agency, JANA, reported that the attackers had seized women and children as hostages in an attempt to negotiate their escape, and that security forces subsequently stormed the building and killed all the gunmen. Libyan state television characterized the attackers as "British-trained terrorists".

Anonymous telephone calls to news agencies in London and Washington, made by individuals claiming to represent the NFSL, asserted responsibility for the attack. A caller stated that "scores of Gaddafi's forces" were either killed or wounded and claimed that some Libyan troops inside the barracks had joined the attackers.

The Reagan administration acknowledged that it had received fragmentary intelligence reports but said it lacked clear details about the incident.

== Aftermath ==
Following the failed attack, Libyan security forces killed the man they identified as the leader of the operation in a shootout in Tripoli on 12 May. Roadblocks and house searches were still ongoing a week after the attack, and foreign diplomats were informed that for "security reasons" they needed permission before traveling to border areas and the south. On 14 May, JANA news agency announced the capture of Ussama Shlouf, describing him as a 24-year-old Libyan, a member of the banned Muslim Brotherhood, and "one of America's agents" involved in the attack. A Tripoli newspaper published his photograph and labelled him a "terrorist".

Libyan Justice Minister Mufta Kaebi declared that the infiltrators had instructions to assassinate key officials, sympathetic diplomats, and foreigners in the oil industry, as well as to attack radio and television stations, airports and docks. The government charged, without providing evidence, that the attackers were Islamic fundamentalists belonging to the Muslim Brotherhood, recruited by the CIA and trained in Sudan by Britain and the United States.

The NFSL claimed in June that security forces had arrested as many as 3,000 people and executed seven individuals without trial during the crackdown. The group said it had compiled its figures from Libyan radio bulletins and televised scenes of hangings. According to the NFSL, the executed individuals were put to death in their own neighborhood streets in the forced presence of relatives, and no charges were filed against any of the detainees, who included teachers, students, businessmen, religious instructors, army officers and government employees. The group also alleged that the government broadcast "staged confessions" and footage of the homes of those arrested being ransacked and set on fire. The NFSL called on international organizations to condemn what it termed "the genocide that Qaddafi has officially organized". Western diplomats in the region estimated that as many as 200 people had been arrested in connection with the attack.
