= Saint-Georges-de-Lévéjac =

- Part of Massegros Causses Gorges
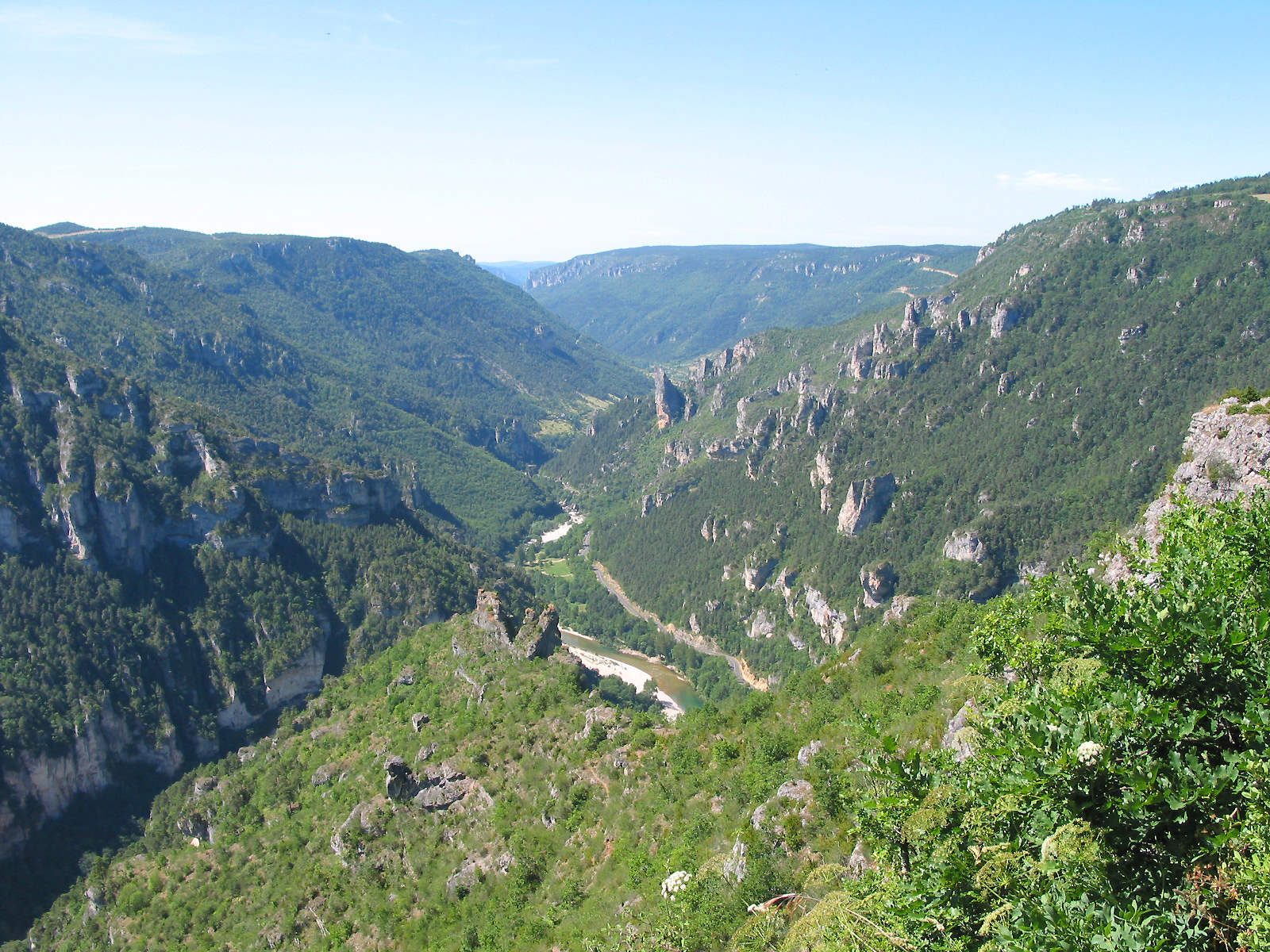
- The Point Sublime of the Gorges du Tarn, located on the territory of the commune

- Coat of arms
- Location of Saint-Georges-de-Lévéjac
- Location within France Location within Occitanie
- Coordinates: 44°19′12″N 3°13′54″E
- Country: France
- Region: Occitania
- Department: Lozère
- Arrondissement: Florac
- Canton: La Canourgue
- Commune: Massegros Causses Gorges
- Area^{1}: 56.26 km^{2} (21.72 sq mi)
- Elevation: 890 m (2,920 ft)
- Highest elevation: 1,005 m (3,297 ft)
- Lowest elevation: 420 m (1,380 ft)
- Population (2022): 262
  - Density: 4.66/km^{2} (12.1/sq mi)
- Time zone: UTC+01:00 (CET)
  - Summer (DST): UTC+02:00 (CEST)
- Postal code: 48500
- ^{1} French Land Register data, which excludes lakes, ponds, glaciers > 1 km^{2} (0.386 sq mi or 247 acres) and river estuaries.

Saint-Georges-de-Lévéjac (French pronunciation: [sɛ̃ ʒɔʁʒ də leveʒak]; Occitan: Sent Jòrdi de Lebejac) is a former commune in the Lozère department in southern France. On 1 January 2017, it was merged into the new commune Massegros Causses Gorges. Its population was 262 in 2022.

== See also ==
- Communes of the Lozère department
