= Massegros Causses Gorges =

- Commune
- Location of Massegros Causses Gorges
- Location within France Location within Occitanie
- Coordinates: 44°18′36″N 3°10′30″E
- Country: France
- Region: Occitania
- Department: Lozère
- Arrondissement: Florac
- Canton: La Canourgue
- Intercommunality: Aubrac Lot Causses Tarn
- Area^{1}: 159.36 km^{2} (61.53 sq mi)
- Population (2023): 935
  - Density: 5.87/km^{2} (15.2/sq mi)
- Time zone: UTC+01:00 (CET)
  - Summer (DST): UTC+02:00 (CEST)
- INSEE/Postal code: 48094 /48500
- ^{1} French Land Register data, which excludes lakes, ponds, glaciers > 1 km^{2} (0.386 sq mi or 247 acres) and river estuaries.

Massegros Causses Gorges is a commune in the department of Lozère, southern France. The municipality was established on 1 January 2017 by merger of the former communes of Le Massegros (the seat), Le Recoux, Saint-Georges-de-Lévéjac, Saint-Rome-de-Dolan and Les Vignes.

== See also ==
- Communes of the Lozère department
