= Corriere del Lunedì =

Italian-language Libyan newspaper

Corriere del Lunedì ("Monday Courrier") was an Italian-language weekly newspaper published in Tripoli, Libya, founded in 1950. The newspaper was published by the Political Association for the Progress of Libya, a pro-independence front organization of the clandestine Communist Party. The newspaper was suppressed prior to Libyan independence in December 1951.

== See also ==
- Libyan Communist Party
