= India–Libya relations =

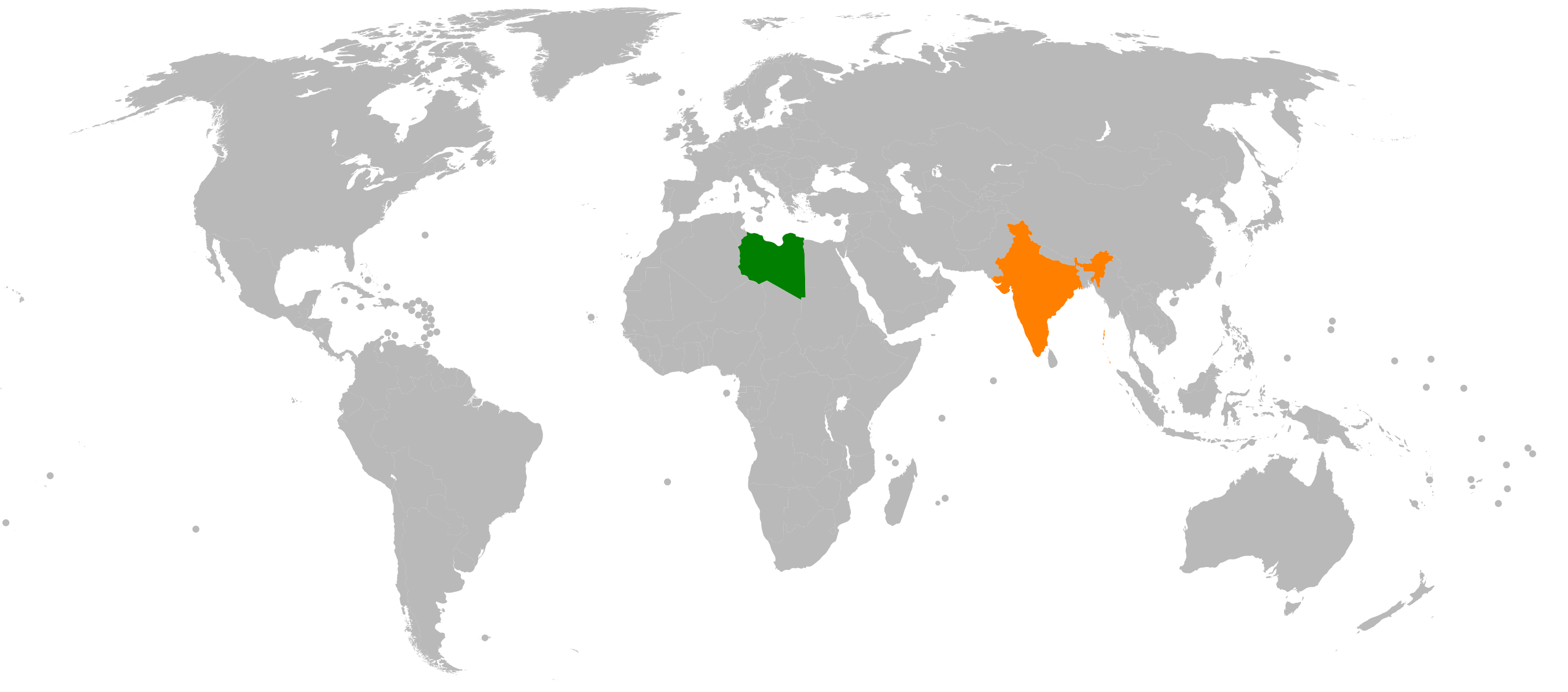

- Libya: India

India–Libya relations are bilateral diplomatic relations between India and Libya. India maintains an embassy in Tripoli and Libya has an embassy in New Delhi.

== History ==
India and Libya enjoy strong bilateral ties. India established its embassy in Tripoli in 1969 and the Indian Prime Minister Indira Gandhi visited Libya in 1984. The Libyan government under Muammar Gaddafi was a member of the Non Aligned Movement and a supporter of India. Gaddafi himself had deep respect for Jawaharlal Nehru who was also the only non-Arab, non-African leader to be commemorated during the fortieth anniversary celebrations of the Libyan revolution. In 1975, Gaddafi had praised India for India's policy of self-reliance and industrial development.

== Political Ties ==
India has generally been supportive of Libya in international fora. Libya has supported India's claim for a permanent seat on the UN Security Council. India welcomed the UN Security Council resolution 1506 of 2003 that lifted sanctions imposed on Libya and there followed a series of high level visits between the two countries till the ouster of the Gaddafi regime in 2011.

During the Libyan Civil War, India abstained from voting on the UN Security Council's Resolutions 1970 and 1973 that authorised NATO action in Libya. In Lok Sabha, resolution was uniamously adopted to condemn NATO's military intervention in Libya. Indian prime minister Manmohan Singh had also criticized the West for the use of force to enforce regime change in a speech at the UN in September 2011. India was silent over the killing of Gaddafi. Although India was among the last few countries to recognise the Libyan National Transitional Council, it agreed to work with the council to help rebuild Libya. India resent an ambassador to Tripoli in July 2012 having shut its mission in Tripoli in 2011.

Libya's former Prime Minister Ali Zidan is an alumnus of the Jawaharlal Nehru University, Delhi and a career diplomat who had served in India in the late 1970s, while the president, Mohammad Yousef Al-Magarief, was Libya's ambassador to India during 1978-81.

== Indians in Libya ==
At the time of the Libyan Revolution, there were 18,000 Indians in Libya. Across Libya Indians are respected as a disciplined workforce and Indian doctors and teachers are acknowledged as the best in the country. India dispatched two naval ships the INS Mysore and INS Jalashwa to ferry Indians from Libya to Egypt and Malta after the beginning of hostilities between the rebels and Gaddafi's forces and was allowed to operate nearly 50 Air India evacuation flights from Tripoli. While most of them left during the conflict, a few hundred stayed back mainly working in Libyan universities and hospitals. Following the end of hostilities in Libya and the formation of a new government there, India partially lifted its ban on emigration of Indians to Libya in June 2012.

== Economic relations ==
Trade between Libya and India amounted to $1.35 billion in 2012-13, with the balance of trade heavily in favour of Libya. Indian exports to Libya stood at $144 million while its imports were valued at $1.2 billion. Indian public sector companies like BHEL, Indian Oil Corporation, Oil India and ONGC Videsh are involved in Libya's hydrocarbon sector and private companies like i-Flex Solutions, Punj Lloyd, Unitech and Sun Pharma are present in Libya and have executed projects there. Since the 1980s, Indian companies have undertaken several infrastructural projects relating to the construction of hospitals, power plants, airports, dams and transmission lines in Libya. Although Libya is an oil rich country, India imports only a minuscule proportion of its oil from Libya. Indians however are an important part of the workforce in the construction and petroleum sectors and their remittances to India are significant.

== Technical Cooperation ==
India has been extending scholarships and training Libyan personnel under its Indian Technical and Economic Cooperation Programme, the Indian Council for Cultural Relations (ICCR) and under the India-Africa Summit Program. Libya has been linked to the Pan-African e-Network project being undertaken by India. Libya and the Election Commission of India have signed an agreement for sharing expertise and the training of personnel in Libya in the conduct of elections. Following the Libyan Civil War, the Government of India gifted 1000 Jaipur Foot artificial limbs to injured Libyans and has proposed the establishment of an Indo-Libyan Prosthetics Center and Vocational Training and Research Centers in Libya. India also provided the Libyan National Transitional Council (NTC) with a humanitarian assistance of $1 million and provided it with another $1 million worth of essential drugs.

== Embassy of India, Tripoli ==
The Embassy of India in Tripoli is a diplomatic mission of the Republic of India to Libya. Embassy is temporarily relocated to Tunisia due to fragile political and security situation in Libya.

India established resident diplomatic mission in 1969. Embassy operations shifted to Tunisia in 2011 after the fall of Muammar Gaddafi. Embassy in Tripoli maintains presence through staff on rotation. India is trying to re-establish full-time resident embassy in Tripoli. Embassy of India, Tunis looks after affairs related to Libya.

Scholarships are offered by the embassy to local nationals to study in India.
