= Belkacem Lounes =

Former President of the World Amazigh Congress

The Right Honourable Belkacem Lounes
- ⴱⴻⵍⴿⴰⵚⴻⵎ ⵍⵓⵏⴻⵙ

President of the World Amazigh Congress
- In office 2002–2011
- Preceded by: Fathi Ben Khalifa
- Succeeded by: Kamira nayt Saïd

Member of the Regional Council of Rhône-Alpes
- In office 2010–2015
- President: Jean-Jack Queyranne

Personal details
- Born: February 6, 1955 (age 71) Algeria
- Occupation: Politician, economist and activist

Belkacem Lounes (Tamazight: Belqasem Lwennas, in Tifinagh: ⴱⴻⵍⴿⴰⵚⴻⵎ ⵍⵓⵏⴻⵙ; born 6 February 1955) is an Algerian Kabyle indigenous politician, economist and activist who was President of the World Amazigh Congress (also known as the CMA) during 2002 and 2011.

== Political activism ==
He is a critic of racism in Pan Arabism. He has been critical of Libya's dictator Muammar al-Gaddafi for belittling the Berber people and culture. On May 3, 2007, wrote an open letter to Libyan leader Mu'ammar Qaddafi in response to the latter's March 1 speech in which he denied the existence of a Berber or Amazigh people in North Africa. In his letter, dated April 10, Lounes protested Qaddafi's statements, saying that the 30 million Amazigh living today in North Africa cannot be ignored. He added that the Amazigh had played a central role in the fight against European colonialism, but that since independence they had been oppressed by the "internal colonialism" of pan-Arabism, which he labels an imperialist ideology. Lounes stated that it was archaic to consider diversity a danger, and calls on the North African governments to commit to democracy and human rights. He said: "There is no worse colonialism than that of the pan-Arabist clan that wants to dominate our people."

In the 2010 French regional elections, he was elected a member of the Rhône-Alpes Regional Council as part of the Régions et Peuples Solidaires. In March 2016, he was appointed expert of the working group of the Commission on the Rights of Indigenous Peoples of Africa within the African Commission on Human and Peoples' Rights of the African Union.
