= Saint-Rome-de-Dolan =

- Part of Massegros Causses Gorges
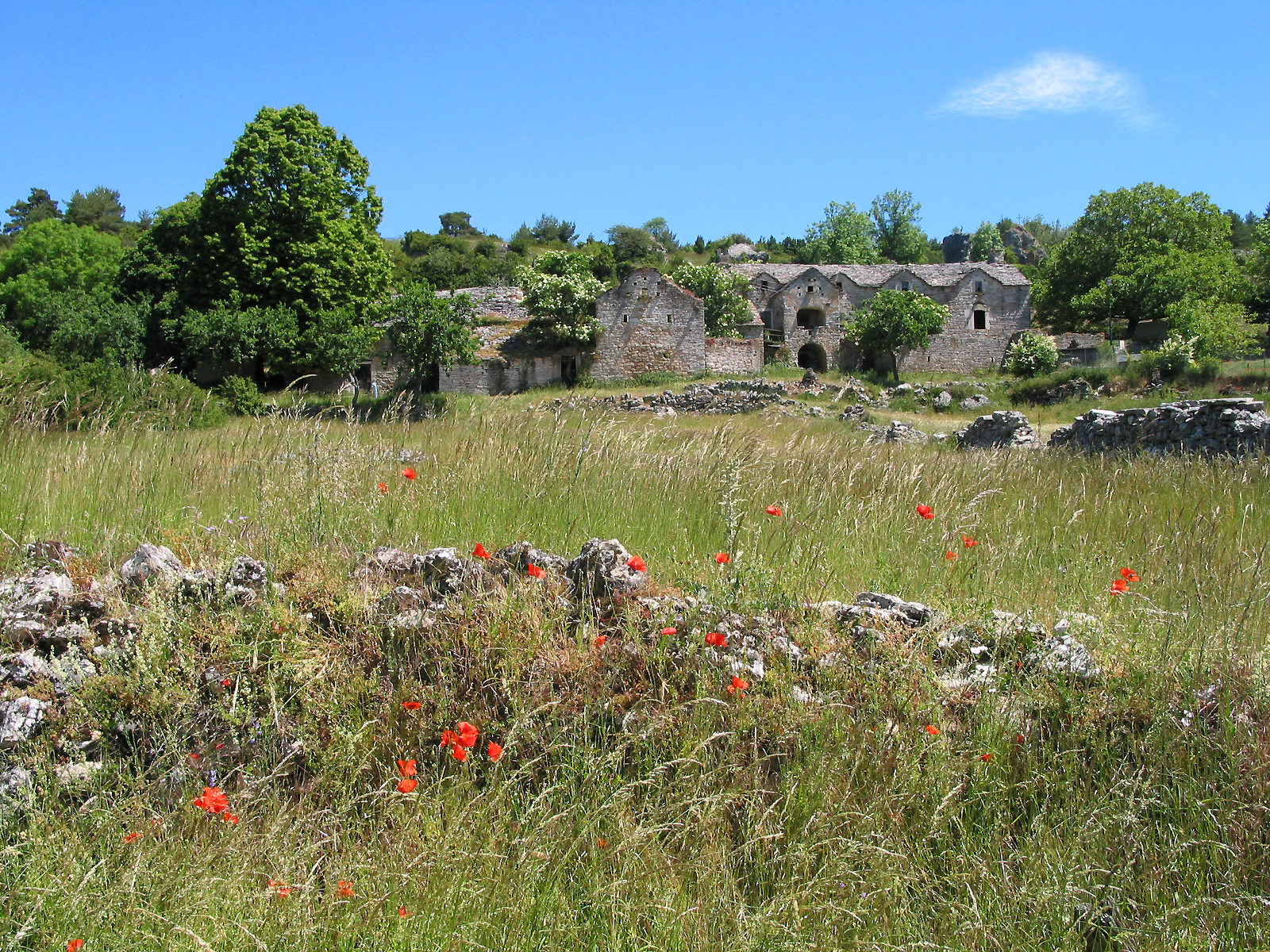
- Caussnarde farm in the hamlet of Almières

- Coat of arms
- Location of Saint-Rome-de-Dolan
- Location within France Location within Occitanie
- Coordinates: 44°16′28″N 3°13′00″E
- Country: France
- Region: Occitania
- Department: Lozère
- Arrondissement: Florac
- Canton: La Canourgue
- Commune: Massegros Causses Gorges
- Area^{1}: 32.63 km^{2} (12.60 sq mi)
- Elevation: 850 m (2,790 ft)
- Highest elevation: 1,001 m (3,284 ft)
- Lowest elevation: 387 m (1,270 ft)
- Population (2022): 66
  - Density: 2.0/km^{2} (5.2/sq mi)
- Time zone: UTC+01:00 (CET)
  - Summer (DST): UTC+02:00 (CEST)
- Postal code: 48500
- ^{1} French Land Register data, which excludes lakes, ponds, glaciers > 1 km^{2} (0.386 sq mi or 247 acres) and river estuaries.

Saint-Rome-de-Dolan (French pronunciation: [sɛ̃ ʁɔm də dɔlɑ̃]; Occitan: Sent Roma de Dolanh) is a former commune in the Lozère department in southern France. On 1 January 2017, it was merged into the new commune Massegros Causses Gorges. Its population was 66 in 2022.

== See also ==
- Communes of the Lozère department
