= 2012 Libyan parliamentary election =

- 7 July 2012
- 200 seats in the General National Congress
Party	Leader	Vote %	Seats
NFA	Mahmoud Jibril	48.14	39
JCP	Mohamed Sowan	10.27	17
UFH	Abdelrahman Sewehli	4.50	2
NFP	Mohammed Magariaf	4.08	3
NCP	Ali Tarhouni	4.00	2
Wadi Al-Hayah Party		0.47	2
Parties with one seat	—	9.81	15
Independents	—	—	120
This lists parties that won seats. See the complete results below.
Prime Minister before	Prime Minister after
Abdurrahim El-Keib; Independent	Ali Zeidan; NPFDW

Elections for a General National Congress (GNC) were held in Libya on 7 July 2012, having been postponed from 19 June. They were the first elections since the overthrow and death of longtime ruler Muammar Gaddafi a year earlier, the first free national elections since 1952, and only the second free national elections since Libya gained independence in 1951.

Once elected, the General National Congress was to appoint a Prime Minister and Cabinet. The GNC was originally to be charged with appointing a Constituent Assembly to draw up Libya's new constitution in an interim period of 18–22 months before a constitutional referendum and new elections on that basis, but the National Transitional Council (NTC) announced on 5 July that the Assembly would instead be directly elected at a later date.

Despite threats of a boycott, a majority of Libyans (61.58%) cast a ballot. However, the election was marred by violence, protests and a number of deaths.

== Electoral system ==
A draft election law was published on 1 January 2012 on the website of the High National Election Commission (HNEC), after which public comments were accepted. The draft law proposed electing 200 representatives, of which at least 10% should be women, unless fewer than 10% of candidates were women. Members of the NTC and Jamahiriya government members, including relatives of Muammar Gaddafi, were barred from running.

The second draft abolished the women's quota and allowed local NTC council members to run in the election; it also changed the electoral system from countrywide to constituency-based. Following further protests against restrictions for dual nationals and other issues, the release of the electoral law was again postponed to 28 January 2012. The NTC also sought the input of the Libyan Women's Platform for Peace, who had proposed an alternative electoral law and criticized the official draft on four key points relating to dual nationals, lack of a women's quota, inadequate countermeasures against corruption and the risk of incentivizing tribal party formation.

A new electoral law was finally drafted on 28–29 January 2012. The election system will be a form of parallel voting, with 64 constituency seats (with independent candidates only) and 136 list seats for party lists. Lists will have to alternate between male and female candidates, in effect ensuring a women's quota. The age required to stand for election was lowered to 21 years, and citizens with dual nationality will be allowed to vote and run in the election. Further changes were later made, changing the ratio to 120 constituency seats and 80 list seats, reportedly in an attempt to reduce the Muslim Brotherhood's influence in the new parliament. The 120 constituency seats would be elected from 69 constituencies, whilst the 80 list seats would be elected in 20 constituencies.

=== Voter registration ===
Registration of voters, parties participating in elections and independent candidates started at 1 May, and was due to finish on 14 May. However, following a call for a boycott of the process by the Council of Cyrenaica, which is seeking autonomy for parts of eastern Libya around the city of Benghazi, the deadline was extended until 21 May. In total 2,865,937 voters, or 80% of the estimated 3 million to 3.5 million electorate, registered for the elections. The registration process was supervised by the United Nations Support Mission in Libya.

Minority groups, such as the Tawerghans, who had been accused of supporting former leader Muammar Gaddafi, said that the election was futile as they are marginalised. They also added that voter registration was difficult. Yet about 90 percent of Tawerghans living in Janzour Naval Academy refugee camp registered to vote.

== Campaign ==
A total of 374 party lists registered to contest the 80 party list seats, together with 2,639 candidates for the 120 constituency seats. The four parties that were expected to dominate the election are the National Front Party, the Justice and Construction Party, the National or Homeland Party and the National Forces Alliance. The National Front Party is linked to the National Front for the Salvation of Libya (NFSL), a former anti-Gaddafi resistance group formed in the 1980s. It is led by Mohamed el-Magariaf, an intellectual based in Eastern Libya. The Justice and Construction Party is the political arm of the Muslim Brotherhood in Libya. The Homeland Party is an Islamist party as well, led by the Islamic cleric Ali al-Sallabi and Abdelhakim Belhadj, the former emir of the Libyan Islamic Fighting Group (LIFG). The National Forces Alliance is a liberal umbrella coalition around ex-interim prime minister Mahmoud Jibril, who himself did not run for a seat in the GNC.

The Libyan Popular National Movement, a political party supporting the policies of Gaddafi, was banned from participating in the elections.

== Conduct ==
Voting was disrupted in some parts of the country, with 6% of the 6,629 polling stations unable to open normally. However all but eight polling stations managed to open up for voters during the day and the remaining eight, including two in the Kufra area, which had seen clashes between Toubous and government forces, opened the following day. In the Benghazi area a polling station was attacked by activists seeking autonomy for the east of the country and an election official was killed by a gun attack on a helicopter carrying voting materials on the day before the election. In eastern Libya former rebels closed five oil terminals at Brega, Ra's Lanuf and Sidra for 48 hours in an attempt to disrupt the elections. In Ajdabiya a pro-federalism protester was shot dead by locals when he tried to steal a ballot box from a polling station. Officials with the HNEC were denied access to Bani Walid by tribal Gaddafi loyalists who control the city, and could not monitor the voting process.

Around 1.7 million of 2.8 million registered voters participated in the elections.

== Results ==
According to first counts, the liberal National Forces Alliance did well in the northern areas except Misrata, whereas the race was more even in the south. The other key contenders were the Islamic Justice and Construction Party, which came in second, and Al-Watan, which in the end won no seats at all.

On 17 July, the High National Election Commission announced provisional results. In the 80 proportional seats, Mahmoud Jibril's National Forces Alliance (NFA) received 48.1%, winning 39 seats. This was followed by the Justice and Construction Party (JCP), which received 10.3% and 17 seats and third was the National Front Party with 4.1% and three seats. The Union for the Homeland and the National Centrist Party also took two seats, as did the Wadi Al-Hayah Party for Democracy and Development. Fifteen other parties won one party list seat each.

The affiliation of the 120 independents is obscure but the election for Prime Minister gave some indication: in the first round Mahmoud Jibril (NFA) got 86 votes, Mustafa Abushagur (independent) got 55 votes and Awad Barasi (JCP) got 41 votes. Then Abushagur defeated Jibril with 96 to 94. It is estimated that 25 independents are associated with the NFA, 17 with Justice and Construction, and 23 are Salafis.

Party	Party list			Constituency			Total seats
Party	Votes	%	Seats	Votes	%	Seats	Total seats
National Forces Alliance	714,769	48.14	39				39
Justice and Construction Party	152,441	10.27	17				17
Union for Homeland	66,772	4.50	2				2
National Front Party	60,586	4.08	3				3
National Centrist Party	59,402	4.00	2				2
Homeland Party	51,292	3.45	0				0
Homeland for Development and Prosperity	23,629	1.59	1				1
Authenticity and Innovation Combine	18,745	1.26	1				1
Al-Hekma (Wisdom) Party	17,129	1.15	1				1
Libyan Youth	16,119	1.09	0				0
The Middle Nation Gathers	15,354	1.03	1				1
Authenticity and Progress come Together	13,679	0.92	1				1
Libyan National Democratic Party	13,092	0.88	1				1
National Parties Alliance	12,735	0.86	1				1
National Democratic Rally Party for Justice and Progress	12,147	0.82	0				0
People's Party	11,917	0.80	0				0
Ar-Resalah (The Message)	7,860	0.53	1				1
Libya Unites as One Nation	7,853	0.53	0				0
Centrist Youth Party	7,319	0.49	1				1
Wadi Al-Hayah Party for Democracy and Development	6,947	0.47	2				2
Democratic Youth Alliance Party	6,476	0.44	0				0
Libya Success	6,391	0.43	0				0
Libya – The Hope	6,093	0.41	1				1
Free National Congress	5,901	0.40	0				0
Authenticity and Development Association	5,250	0.35	0				0
Nafusa Mountains Gathering	5,226	0.35	0				0
Authenticity and Construction	4,818	0.32	0				0
Democratic Party for the Rule of Law	4,769	0.32	0				0
National Movement for Justice and Development	4,713	0.32	0				0
Renaissance and Development Entity	4,629	0.31	0				0
Authenticity and Justice Alliance	4,604	0.31	0				0
National Congress Association	4,452	0.30	0				0
National Rally Party	4,409	0.30	0				0
Independent National Rally	4,276	0.29	0				0
Brotherhood Party for Justice and Development	4,161	0.28	0				0
Libyan Accord Party	3,926	0.26	0				0
National Democratic Alliance	3,707	0.25	0				0
National Democratic Consensus Party	3,686	0.25	0				0
Labaika National Party	3,472	0.23	1				1
Progress for Libya	3,319	0.22	0				0
Tripoli Gathering	3,103	0.21	0				0
Libyan Unity Gathering	3,053	0.21	0				0
The Center Party for Development and Security	3,039	0.20	0				0
Libyan Party for Liberty and Development	2,691	0.18	1				1
Libyan Development Party	2,649	0.18	0				0
Change and Construction Party	2,570	0.17	0				0
Libya, the Civilization	2,253	0.15	0				0
Renaissance	2,227	0.15	0				0
Entity, Homeland, Freedom, Justice	2,156	0.15	0				0
National Democratic Movement	2,146	0.14	0				0
The Center Gathering for Democracy, Justice and Development	2,094	0.14	0				0
Dawa and Development Party	2,072	0.14	0				0
National Current Gathering	2,062	0.14	0				0
National Communication	1,887	0.13	0				0
The Transition from Revolution to State	1,810	0.12	0				0
Free Libyans Party	1,781	0.12	0				0
Libya for All	1,611	0.11	0				0
Development for the Future	1,596	0.11	0				0
Justice, Reform and Development Alliance	1,586	0.11	0				0
Conservative Independence Party	1,555	0.10	0				0
Promise (National Rally for Justice and Democracy)	1,546	0.10	0				0
Arrakeeza (The Foundation)	1,525	0.10	1				1
Loyalists Party	1,498	0.10	0				0
Al-Wafa Foundation for Martyrs	1,496	0.10	0				0
Al-Kadwa Political Forum	1,450	0.10	0				0
Democratic Development and Prosperity Party	1,420	0.10	0				0
Nation and Prosperity	1,400	0.09	1				1
Virtue Gathering	1,363	0.09	0				0
National Constitutional Rally	1,355	0.09	0				0
National Party of Wadi ash-Shati'	1,355	0.09	1				1
Libyan Democratic Rally Party	1,334	0.09	0				0
Libyan Youth Movement	1,332	0.09	0				0
Libya Al Watan Party	1,324	0.09	0				0
Libyan Rally Party	1,320	0.09	0				0
Peace and development	1,255	0.08	0				0
National Reform Gathering	1,237	0.08	0				0
Libya Union Gathering	1,235	0.08	0				0
Al-Wefaq and Development Party	1,230	0.08	0				0
Libyan Organization for National Unity	1,213	0.08	0				0
National Vision	1,186	0.08	0				0
Coalition to Encourage Women's and Youth Participation in Decision-Making	1,106	0.07	0				0
National Youth Assembly	1,093	0.07	0				0
Libya Renaissance Movement	1,076	0.07	0				0
Democratic Center Party	1,058	0.07	0				0
Libyan Youth Political Bloc	1,044	0.07	0				0
Independent National Gathering - Tarhuna	1,038	0.07	0				0
National Loyalty Party	996	0.07	0				0
National Bloc for Change and Reform	982	0.07	0				0
Freedom and justice	955	0.06	0				0
Sharia current	952	0.06	0				0
Liberation Party for Justice and Development	926	0.06	0				0
Justice and progress	891	0.06	0				0
Libyan National Free Assembly	872	0.06	0				0
Labour Party	825	0.06	0				0
White Hands Coalition	798	0.05	0				0
Libya Unites in Purpose and Destiny	788	0.05	0				0
Umma Party	762	0.05	0				0
The Future	758	0.05	0				0
Wadi Al-Rimal Development and Change Group	706	0.05	0				0
Libya's Hopes	679	0.05	0				0
National Rally for Solidarity and Development	665	0.04	0				0
Libyan Solidarity Gathering	659	0.04	0				0
Afaq Association for Women and Child Care	655	0.04	0				0
Renewal Gathering	637	0.04	0				0
Our Youth	572	0.04	0				0
National Authenticity Forum	518	0.03	0				0
Moderate Democratic Gathering	488	0.03	0				0
Democratic Social Reform Gathering	458	0.03	0				0
United Libya Gathering	429	0.03	0				0
Homeland Alliance Coalition	414	0.03	0				0
Advancement and Renewal	411	0.03	0				0
National Youth Gathering	401	0.03	0				0
Development Party	400	0.03	0				0
National Accord Party	377	0.03	0				0
Libyan Spring	363	0.02	0				0
New National Congress list	345	0.02	0				0
Future Vision Forum	331	0.02	0				0
Democratic Competence Party	323	0.02	0				0
Libyan Republican Party	321	0.02	0				0
Youth Voice Gathering	314	0.02	0				0
Libyan Club for Politics and Development	312	0.02	0				0
Libya, the Beating Heart	289	0.02	0				0
Free Democratic Bloc	282	0.02	0				0
Internal National Forces	272	0.02	0				0
Libyan Party	268	0.02	0				0
Homeland Belt Gathering	254	0.02	0				0
United Libya Centrist Party	177	0.01	0				0
National Party of Libyan Youth	165	0.01	0				0
Liberal Party	112	0.01	0				0
The Libya we Want	105	0.01	0				0
Independent						120	120
Total	1,484,702	100.00	80			120	200
