= La Canourgue =

- Commune
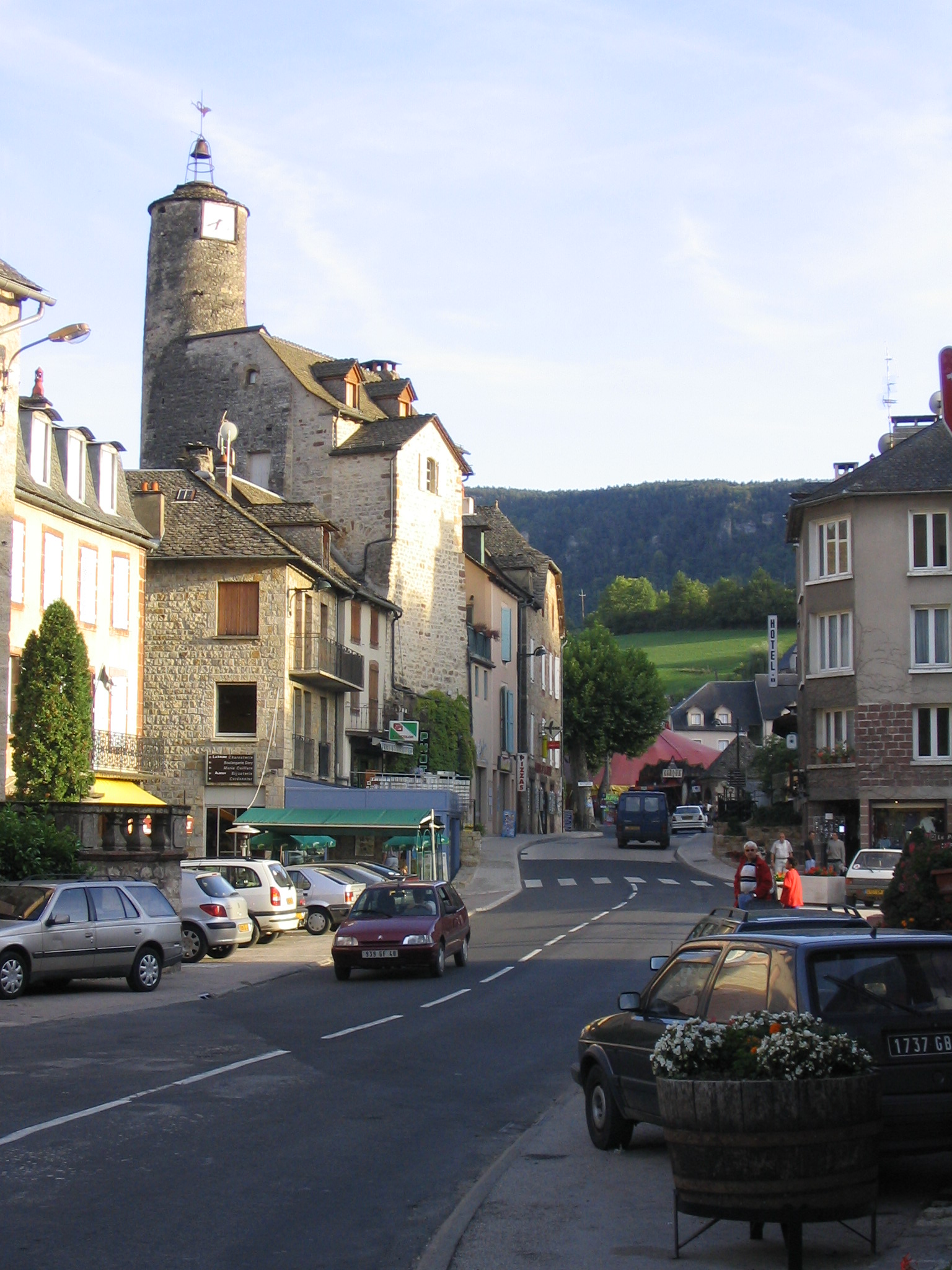
- The road through La Canourgue

- Coat of arms
- Location of La Canourgue
- Location within France Location within Occitanie
- Coordinates: 44°26′01″N 3°12′56″E
- Country: France
- Region: Occitania
- Department: Lozère
- Arrondissement: Mende
- Canton: La Canourgue
- Intercommunality: Aubrac Lot Causses Tarn

Government
  - Mayor (2020–2026): Claude Malzac
- Area^{1}: 104.29 km^{2} (40.27 sq mi)
- Elevation: 563 m (1,847 ft)
- Highest elevation: 1,008 m (3,307 ft)
- Lowest elevation: 521 m (1,709 ft)
- Population (2023): 2,074
  - Density: 19.89/km^{2} (51.51/sq mi)
- Time zone: UTC+01:00 (CET)
  - Summer (DST): UTC+02:00 (CEST)
- INSEE/Postal code: 48034 /48500
- ^{1} French Land Register data, which excludes lakes, ponds, glaciers > 1 km^{2} (0.386 sq mi or 247 acres) and river estuaries.

La Canourgue (French pronunciation: [la kanuʁɡ]; Occitan: La Canorga) is a commune in the Lozère department in southern France. In 1973 it absorbed three former communes: Auxillac, La Capelle and Montjézieu. It is sometimes referred to in French as "La petite Venise lozérienne", the Little Venice of Lozère.

Exposed to a mountain climate, it is drained by the Lot, the Urugne, the Chardonnet stream, the Felgeyre stream and by various other small watercourses. The commune has a Natura 2000 network (the "Urugne valley") and four zones of ecological, fauna and floral interest.

La Canourgue is a rural commune having experienced a strong increase in population since 1962. It is the central city of the agglomeration of La Canourgue. Its inhabitants are called the Canourguais or Canourguaises.

The commune of La Canourgue has been labeled "Village étape" since 2006.

== Geography ==
=== Location ===
The commune is located in the southwest of the Lozère department, in Gévaudan, on the Urugne (small tributary of the Lot) at the foot of the Causse de Sauveterre which the commune occupies in large part.

The commune served as a location for the 2006 film A Good Year.

== Population ==
Population data refer to the commune in its geography as of January 2025.

Historical population
Year	Pop.	±% p.a.
1968	1,719	—
1975	1,850	+1.05%
1982	1,804	−0.36%
1990	1,817	+0.09%
1999	1,922	+0.63%
2007	2,116	+1.21%
2012	2,143	+0.25%
2017	2,161	+0.17%
2023	2,074	−0.68%
Source: INSEE

== See also ==
- Communes of the Lozère department

== Gallery ==
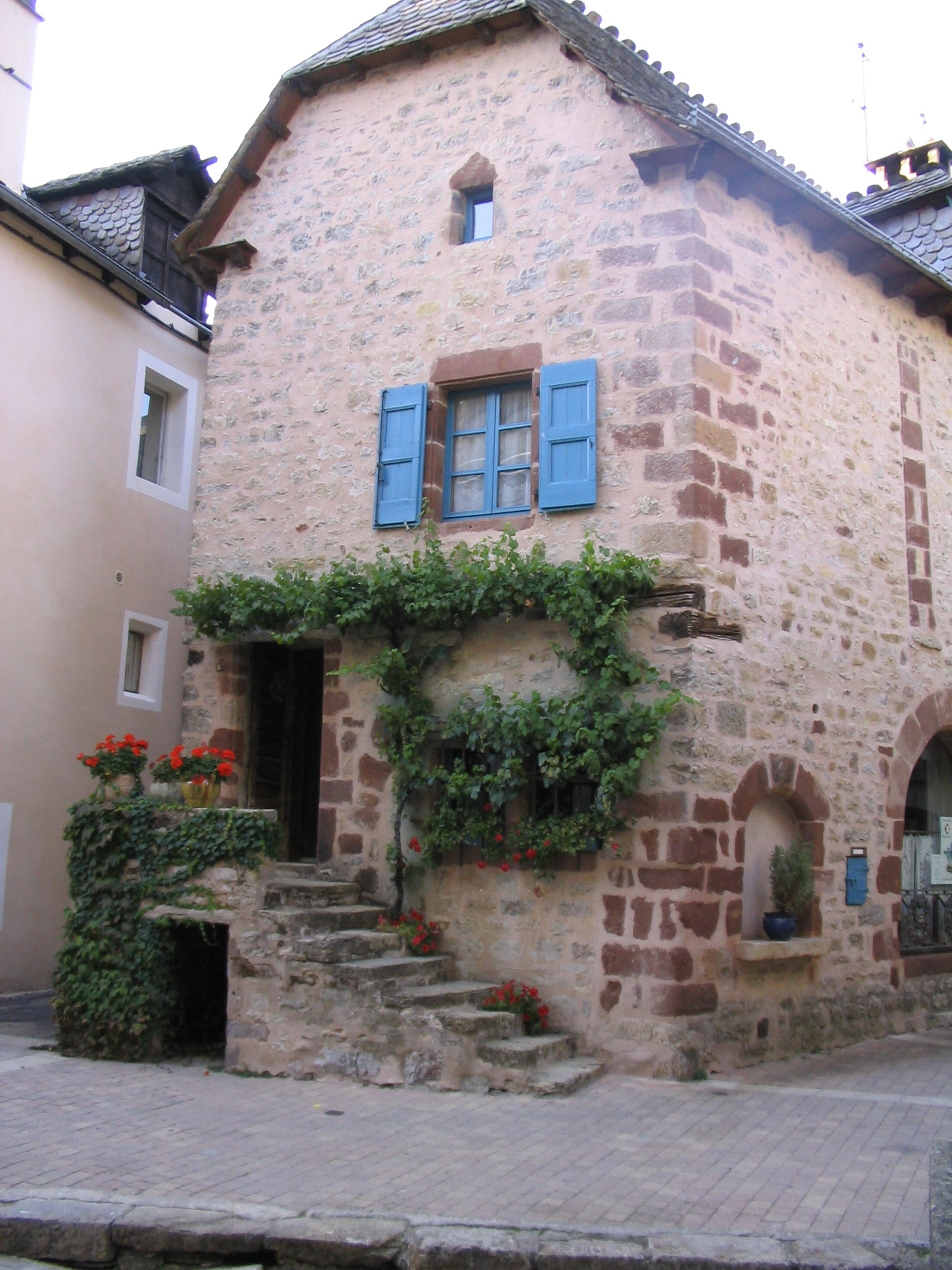
House in La Canourgue

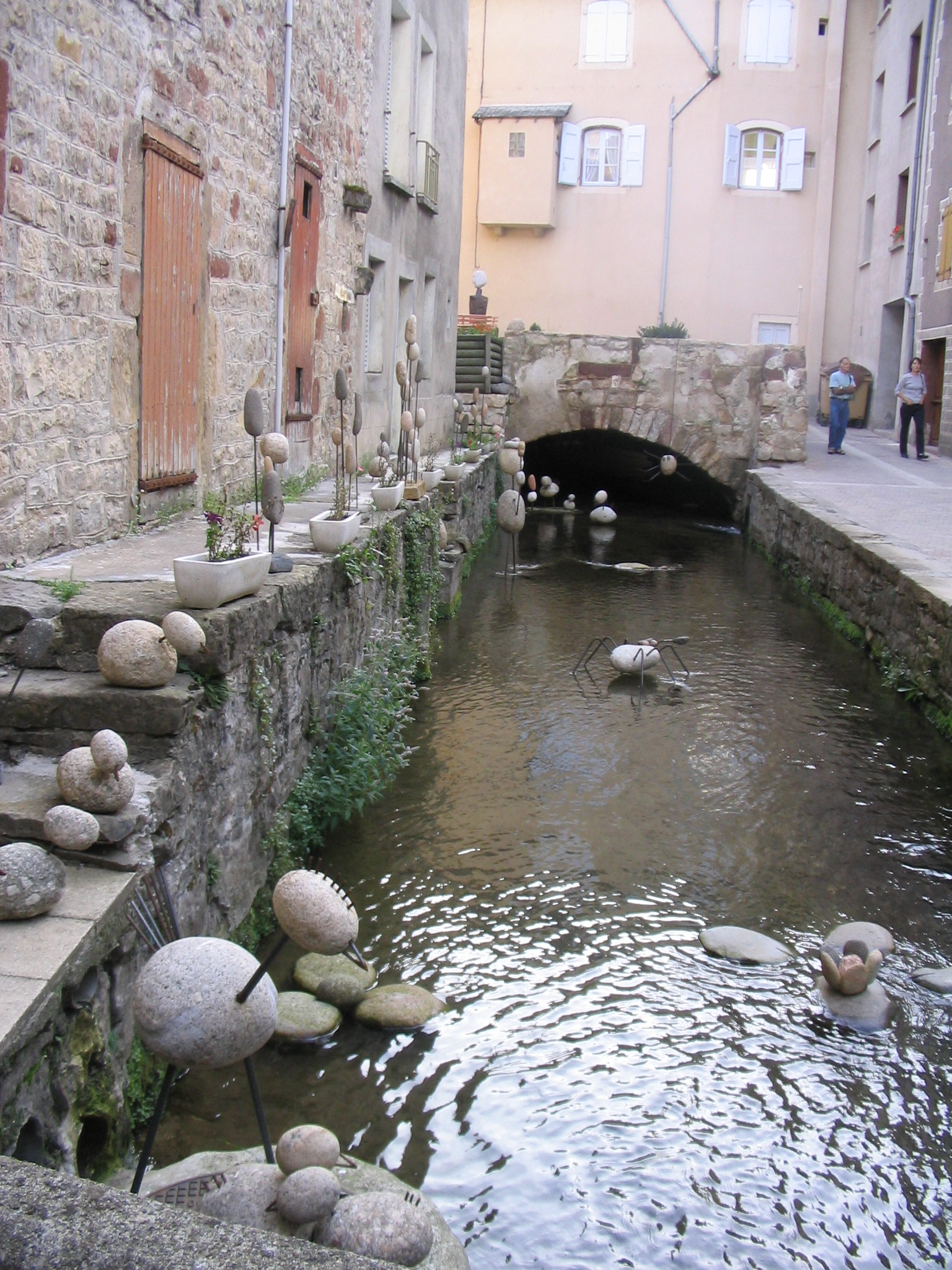
Canal in La Canourgue
