= Ibrahim Abdulaziz Sahad =

Libyan politician

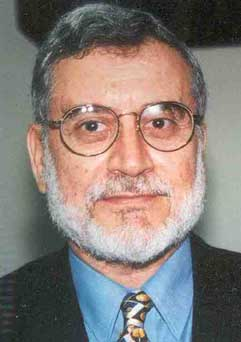
- Ibrahim Sahad

Secretary General of the National Front for the Salvation of Libya
- Incumbent
- Assumed office August 2001

Ibrahim Abdulaziz Sahad is the Secretary General of the National Front for the Salvation of Libya (NFSL).

== Biography ==
Sahad graduated from the Libyan Military Academy in 1963, and he ranked first in his class. He served as a military officer in the Libyan Army from 1963 to 1969, as an instructor in the Intelligence Academy. He also served as an aide to the commander of military intelligence unit, and staff officer in the electronic communication division of the Libyan Air Force.

During Sahad's time in the military, he completed several tours of training in the Infantry School and Military Intelligence School in Al Marj, School of Field Engineering in Benghazi, Military Intelligence School in New Jersey, US, and Royal Artillery Academy in Wales, U.K. He climbed the military ranks until he became a candidate for Captain in August 1970.

Sahad was receiving training in Air Defense Systems in Britain when the military coup of Colonel Muamar Gaddafi took place in September 1969, and he immediately returned to Libya and was detained upon his arrival. He was alienated by the Gaddafi regime and sent to diplomatic posts in Jordan, the U.S., and the United Nations, and served as the Libyan Chargé d'Affaires in Argentina, and Director for Political Affairs of the Americas in the Libyan Ministry of Foreign Affairs.

Sahad resigned from his post as Libyan Chargé d'Affaires in Argentina, and announced that was joining the ranks of the Libyan opposition. He participated in the formation of the National Front for the Salvation of Libya (NFSL).1 During the inaugural sessions of the NFSL's National Congress in Morocco (1982), he was elected to the Executive Committee and was appointed Political Commissioner. He was re-elected to the same post in the 2nd and 3rd sessions of the National Congress. During the 4th session of the NFSL National Congress, Sahad was elected as the 2nd Deputy to the NFSL Secretary General. In August 2001, he was elected as the Secretary General of the NFSL. He has since been re-elected for his 2nd term as Secretary General during the 5th session of the NFSL's National Congress held in July, 2007.
