= Banassac-Canilhac =

- Commune
- Location of Banassac-Canilhac
- Location within France Location within Occitanie
- Coordinates: 44°26′06″N 3°12′04″E
- Country: France
- Region: Occitania
- Department: Lozère
- Arrondissement: Mende
- Canton: La Canourgue

Government
  - Mayor (2020–2026): David Rodrigues
- Area^{1}: 24.68 km^{2} (9.53 sq mi)
- Population (2023): 1,064
  - Density: 43.11/km^{2} (111.7/sq mi)
- Time zone: UTC+01:00 (CET)
  - Summer (DST): UTC+02:00 (CEST)
- INSEE/Postal code: 48017 /48500
- ^{1} French Land Register data, which excludes lakes, ponds, glaciers > 1 km^{2} (0.386 sq mi or 247 acres) and river estuaries.

Banassac-Canilhac (French pronunciation: [banasak kanijak]; Occitan: Banaçac e Canilhac) is a commune in the department of Lozère, southern France. The municipality was established on 1 January 2016 by merger of the former communes of Banassac and Canilhac.

== See also ==
- Communes of the Lozère department
