= Saint-Saturnin, Lozère =

Saint-Saturnin
- Commune
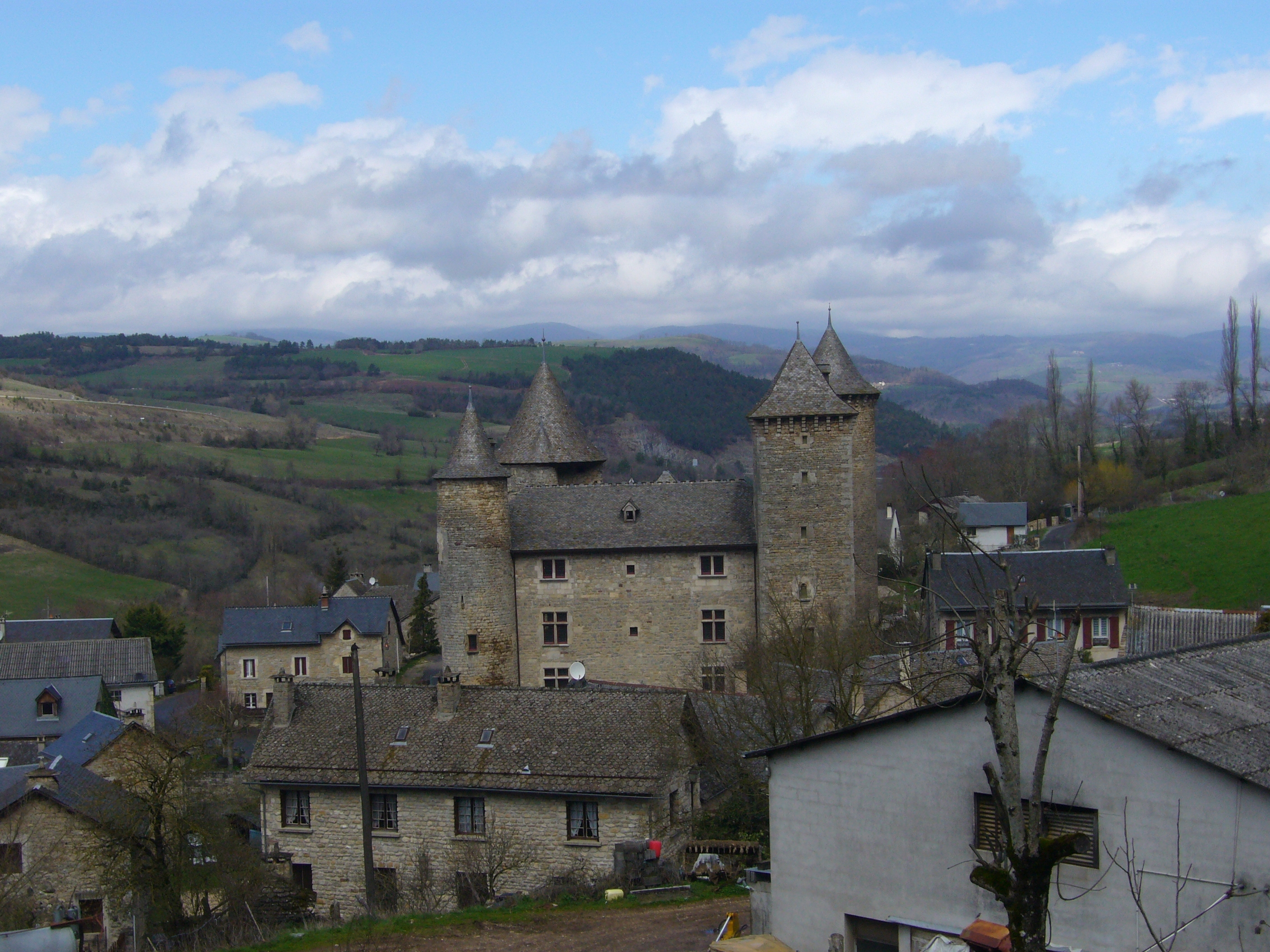
- The village of Saint-Saturnin
- Location of Saint-Saturnin
- Location within France Location within Occitanie
- Coordinates: 44°24′45″N 3°11′20″E
- Country: France
- Region: Occitania
- Department: Lozère
- Arrondissement: Mende
- Canton: La Canourgue
- Intercommunality: Aubrac Lot Causses Tarn

Government
  - Mayor (2020–2026): René Confort
- Area^{1}: 9.14 km^{2} (3.53 sq mi)
- Elevation: 600 m (2,000 ft)
- Highest elevation: 967 m (3,173 ft)
- Lowest elevation: 563 m (1,847 ft)
- Population (2023): 56
  - Density: 6.1/km^{2} (16/sq mi)
- Time zone: UTC+01:00 (CET)
  - Summer (DST): UTC+02:00 (CEST)
- INSEE/Postal code: 48181 /48500
- ^{1} French Land Register data, which excludes lakes, ponds, glaciers > 1 km^{2} (0.386 sq mi or 247 acres) and river estuaries.

Saint-Saturnin (French pronunciation: [sɛ̃ satyʁnɛ̃]; Occitan: Sent Adornin) is a commune in the Lozère department in southern France.

== See also ==
- Communes of the Lozère department
