= Les Vignes =

- Part of Massegros Causses Gorges
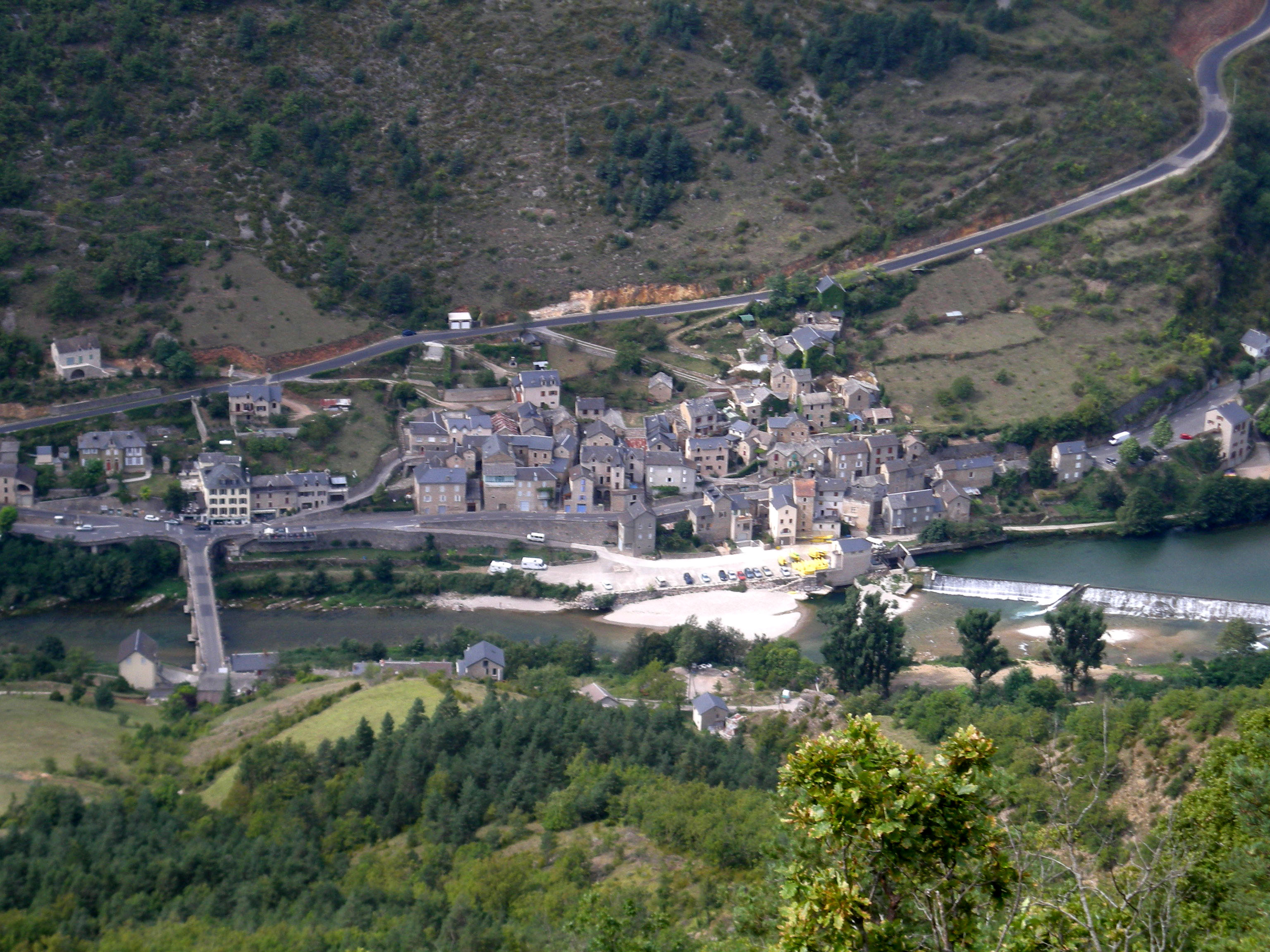
- View of Les Vignes and the Tarn River from Causse Méjean

- Coat of arms
- Location of Les Vignes
- Location within France Location within Occitanie
- Coordinates: 44°16′44″N 3°13′41″E
- Country: France
- Region: Occitania
- Department: Lozère
- Arrondissement: Florac
- Canton: La Canourgue
- Commune: Massegros Causses Gorges
- Area^{1}: 28.84 km^{2} (11.14 sq mi)
- Elevation: 420 m (1,380 ft)
- Highest elevation: 2,334 m (7,657 ft)
- Lowest elevation: 400 m (1,300 ft)
- Population (2022): 80
  - Density: 2.8/km^{2} (7.2/sq mi)
- Time zone: UTC+01:00 (CET)
  - Summer (DST): UTC+02:00 (CEST)
- Postal code: 48210
- ^{1} French Land Register data, which excludes lakes, ponds, glaciers > 1 km^{2} (0.386 sq mi or 247 acres) and river estuaries.

Les Vignes (French pronunciation: [le viɲ]; Occitan: Las Vinhas) is a former commune in the Lozère department in southern France. On 1 January 2017, it was merged into the new commune Massegros Causses Gorges. Its population was 80 in 2022.

== See also ==
- Communes of the Lozère department
- Causse Méjean
- Gorges du Tarn
