= National Conference for the Libyan Opposition =

Libyan opposition organization

The former Kingdom of Libya's flag was used by the National Conference, eventually becoming Libya's official flag after the overthrow of Muammar Gaddafi.

The National Conference for the Libyan Opposition (NCLO) was a Libyan opposition organization during the later years of the Gaddafi government. Its stated goal was to bring "an end to tyranny and the establishment of a constitutional and democratic legitimacy" to Libya. The NCLO was formed in 2005 and helped to organize some of the initial protests which led to the Libyan Civil War.

== Background ==
In May 2005, the Organizing Committee for the National Conference of the Libyan Opposition held a series of weekly meetings to discuss and develop an agenda for a conference "to put together practical approaches for following up on many efforts made by various Libyan political groups and individuals in their challenge of the Libyan dictatorship" of Muammar Gaddafi.

The National Conference for the Libyan Opposition was formed on 26 June 2005 in London. Composed primarily of opposition advocates and activists living outside Libya, the Conference met sharing three demands:

1. The relinquishing of all Colonel Muammar Gaddafi’s revolutionary, political, military and security powers;
2. The formation of a transitional government run by individuals who are recognized of being trustworthy and have the capabilities to run the country for a period no longer than one year, in order to bring the country back into constitutional life; and
3. Establishment of a constitutional and democratic state built on key concepts such as political and cultural diversity and peaceful transition of government powers; a state that guarantees fundamental freedom and human rights, that establishes the rule of law, equality and equal opportunity to all Libyan citizens without any form of discrimination; that protects and develops national resources, and endows balanced foreign relations built on mutual respect.

Following the 2005 Conference, the NCLO agreed on a mission to call for a medium to address the Libyan people and the need to create a legal mechanism for prosecuting the leaders of the Gaddafi regime. The Conference has since been using the internet and social networking sites such as Facebook as political tools to organize and garner support.

== Libyan civil war ==
During the Libyan Civil War, the NCLO aided in organizing the 17 February "Day of Rage", stating that "all" groups opposed to Gaddafi both within Libya and in exile planned the protests in memory of the demonstrations in Benghazi on 17 February 2006 that were initially against the Jyllands-Posten Muhammad cartoons, but which turned into protests against Gaddafi.

The NCLO's website disappeared sometime after the end of the civil war, and the organization is now presumed to have disbanded as its purpose is fulfilled and several of its member groups no longer exist.

== Member groups ==
The National Conference for the Libyan Opposition is an umbrella group of seven smaller organisations, these include:

- Libyan League for Human Rights
- Libyan Tmazight Congress (A.L.T)
- National Front for the Salvation of Libya
- Libyan Constitutional Union
- Libyan National Movement
