= Libu Party =

Political party in Libya

Libu Party Akabar en Libu ⴰⴾⴰⴱⴰⵔ ⴻⵏ ⵍⵉⴱⵓ
- Arabic name: حزب ليبو / حزب ليبيا الأمة
- President: Fathi Ben Khalifa
- Founded: 2017
- Headquarters: Zuwara
- Ideology: Libyan nationalism; Liberalism; Berberism
- Colors: Blue and Gold

Website
- libu.ly facebook.com/Libu.party

The Libu Party (Berber language: Akabar en Libu, ⴰⴾⴰⴱⴰⵔ ⴻⵏ ⵍⵉⴱⵓ, Arabic: حزب ليبو) also known as Libya The Nation Party, is a Libyan political party founded in 2017 by the former World Amazigh Congress president Fathi Ben Khalifa. The main headquarters of the party is in the coastal city of Zuwara with branches in Tripoli, Ubari and other cities.

According to its founder, the party is aimed at establishing a democratic Libyan state. The party defends on the Amazigh (Berber) Libyan identity instead of Arabism. The party also calls for the recognition of the Berber language (Tamazight) as an official language of the State of Libya.

The party president also said he is "not sure" whether the party would participate or not in the elections proposed by the UN to be held in 2018.
