= World Amazigh Congress =

International organization of the Amazigh people

- Congrès Mondial Amazigh
- Agraw Amaḍlan Amaziɣ ⴰⴳⵔⴰⵡ ⴰⵎⴰⴹⵍⴰⵏ ⴰⵎⴰⵣⵉⵖ
- Abbreviation: CMA (French); AAA (Tamazight)
- Formation: 1 September 1995; 31 years ago at Saint-Rome-de-Dolan
- Type: INGO
- Headquarters: 9 rue Parrot, Paris, France
- Location: Global
- Region served: Northwestern Africa
- Services: Protect the history, culture, language and rights of the Amazigh people
- Fields: Legal advocacy, Media attention, direct-appeal campaigns, research, lobbying
- Members: ▲1,000 members
- Official language: French, Berber languages
- President: Kamira Nait Sid
- Website: CMA

The World Amazigh Congress (Tamazight: ⴰⴳⵔⴰⵡ ⴰⵎⴰⴹⵍⴰⵏ ⴰⵎⴰⵣⵉⵖ, Agraw Amaḍlan Amaziɣ; French: Congrès mondial amazigh, CMA) is an international non-governmental organization made up of Amazigh sociocultural and development associations from both North Africa and the diaspora to have a coordination and representation structure.

It was founded at the first-ever congress held between 1-3 of September in 1995 in Saint-Rome-de-Dolan, France which brought together over a hundred delegates and representatives from Amazigh tribes and associations, from countries all over North Africa, Europe, and America including Mali, Morocco, Algeria and Tunisia. The organization is based in Paris and is independent of any states and political parties.

The World Amazigh Congress has been described as the "United Nations of the Amazigh people" due to its inclusivity, representation of all tribes from all over North Africa, gender equality, and transparency.

In October 2011, Fathi Ben Khalifa was elected president of the Congress, replacing Belkacem Lounes and in July 2015, Kamira Nait Sid was elected as a new president of the Congress.
