= Mohammed Ali Abdallah =

Libyan political activist (born 1975)

Mohammed Ali Abdallah Addarrat محمد علي عبدالله الضراط
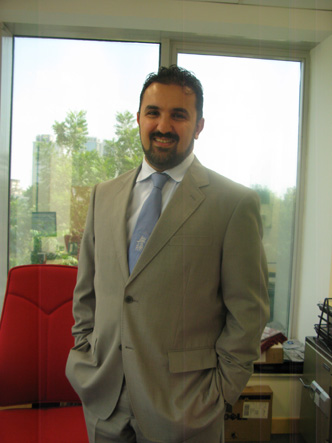

Personal details
- Born: 13 September 1975 (age 50) Tripoli, Libya
- Party: The National Front Party
- Profession: Technology Sales Executive; Information Technology

Mohammed Ali Abdallah Addarrat (born 13 September 1975 in Tripoli, Libya) is a Libyan political activist. He served as Senior Advisor to the Libyan Government of National Accord for US Affairs.

== Early life ==
He is the second of seven children to Ali Abdallah Addarrat and Fatima Senoussi.

== Career ==
Addarrat joined the National Front for the Salvation of Libya while in exile, and became one of its young protégés. He worked at Al-Inqad magazine and the Radio Broadcasting team. He was a member of a musical group that produced patriotic songs about Libya. He was appointed to the NFSL's Permanent Bureau in 2002, and to its executive committee in 2004. He was elected Deputy Secretary General of the NFSL in 2007. He was responsible for NFSL's operations inside Libya from 2004 until the 2011 Libyan civil war as media representative. Addarrat served a 2-year term in the inaugural General National Congress of Libya 2012–2014, and as chair of the Financial Planning, Budget, and Finance oversight sub-committee. He was the president of the National Front Party from 2012 - 2017. He was selected to serve on the UN-led political dialogue group that produced the Libyan Political Agreement representing NFP.

He took political leadership and professional consultative roles between 2012 and 2017. He served as a senior advisor for US affairs to the Libyan Government of National Accord (GNA).
