= Ensaf Movement =

Political party in Libya

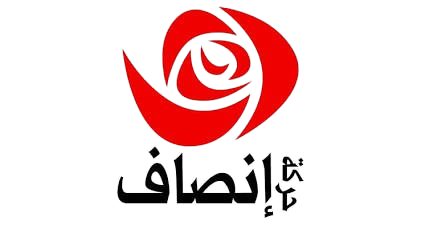
- Leader: Mohammad Alareshiya
- Founded: 2014
- Ideology: Secularism; Social democracy Progressivism; Labourism; Feminism
- Political position: Centre-left

The Ensaf Movement (Arabic: حركة إنصاف الليبية, or "Justice Movement") is a social-democratic political party in Libya. The party is led by Mohammad Alareshiya and was founded in early 2014. The party advocates worker rights, secularism, feminism and disbandment of militias. Its founder and current leader formerly served as its only member in the Presidential Council.

== Ideology ==
The movement cites social democracy and the Nordic model as inspirations for its political program. It opposes privatization and warns against the consequences of borrowing from the IMF and the World Bank.
