= Libyan National Movement =

Political party in Libya

Libyan National Movement الحركة الوطنية الليبية
- Secretary-General: Muftah Lamlum
- Founded: December 1980; 45 years ago
- Preceded by: Libyan Arab Socialist Ba'ath Party
- Newspaper: Sawt at-Talia (discontinued)
- Ideology: Arab nationalism Ba'athism; Left-wing nationalism
- National affiliation: National Conference for the Libyan Opposition

Party flag

Website
- sawt-altalea.com

The Libyan National Movement (Arabic: الحركة الوطنية الليبية, al-Ḥarakah al-Waṭanīyah al-Lībīyah) is a Libyan political organization. The Libyan National Movement was established in December 1980, by opponents of Muammar Gaddafi's government. The founder of the organization was the Ba'athist lawyer Umran Burweiss. Muftah Lamlum is the general secretary of the Libyan National Movement. Politically, the Libyan National Movement has a left-wing nationalist agenda with a Ba'athist orientation. The organization operates in exile, primarily amongst Libyans in Europe, during the mid-1980s it was active amongst students abroad. The publication of the organization was called Sawt at-Talia ('Voice of the Vanguard'). The magazine was later discontinued and substituted by a website.

The organization was originally financed by Iraqi Ba'athists. which enabled it to produce relatively high-quality propaganda materials. For example, it issued audio cassettes, which were smuggled into Libya, alongside Sawt at-Talia during the 1980s. The organization also ran radio broadcasts over Radio Baghdad.

In January 1987, the Libyan National Movement and seven other opposition groups (such as the Libyan National Struggle Movement and the Libyan Liberation Organization) agreed to form a working group headed by Major Abd al Munim al Huni, a former RCC member who had been living in Cairo since the 1975 coup attempt.

In July 2005, the Libyan National Movement took part in a foundation of the National Conference for the Libyan Opposition in London, which signed a joint 'national accord' calling for the removal of Gaddafi from power and the establishment of a transitional government.
