= Libyan Arab Socialist Ba'ath Party =

Libyan Arab Socialist Ba'ath Party Arabic: حزب البعث العربي الاشتراكي الليبي Italian: Partito Baath Arabo Socialista Libico
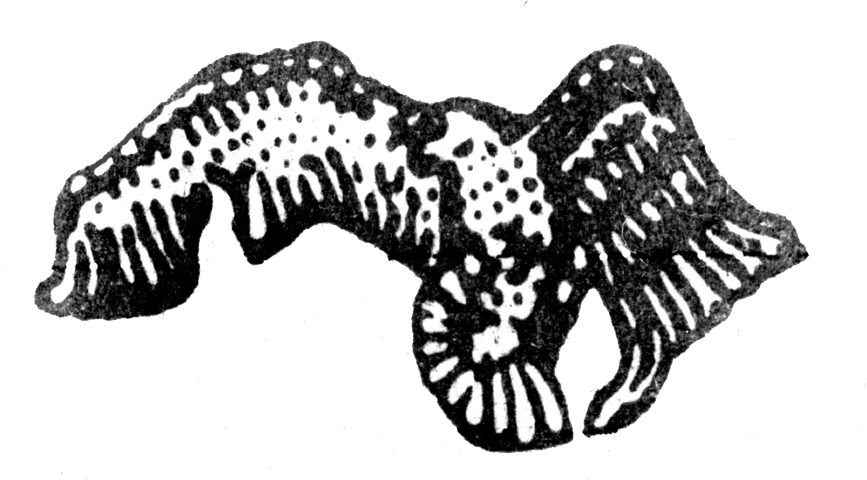
- Founded: 1950s
- Dissolved: 1980s
- Succeeded by: Libyan National Movement
- Ideology: Ba'athism; Saddamism
- Regional affiliation: Arab Socialist Ba’ath Party (1950s–1966); Iraq-led Ba’ath Party (1966–1980s)
- Colors: Black, Red, White and Green (Pan-Arab colors)
- Slogan: "Unity, liberty, socialism"

Party flag

The Libyan Arab Socialist Ba'ath Party (Arabic:حزب البعث العربي الاشتراكي الليبي Hizb Al-Ba'ath Al-'Arabi Al-Ishtiraki Al-Libiy; Italian: Partito Baath Arabo Socialista Libico) was a political party in Libya founded in the 1950s by Amr Taher Deghayes. It was the Libyan regional branch of the Arab Socialist Ba'ath Party. Following the 1966 split, it was affiliated with Iraq-led Ba’ath Party.

== History ==
Ba'athism was a major political force in Libya following the establishment of the United Arab Republic. Many intellectuals were attracted to Ba'athist ideology during the later years of the Kingdom of Libya. However, with help from Nasserist propaganda, several Ba'athists changed affiliation and became Nasserists instead. The growth of these pan-Arab ideologies concerned the government, which led to the incarceration of several Nasserist and Ba'athist military officers in the early 1960s. The Ba'athists were accused of working to overthrow "the political, economic and social system" of the Kingdom; their sentences ranged from everything to eight months to two years.

By 1964, the Libyan Regional Branch had only managed to establish one-level below the Regional Command, the branch-level. Syrian specialist John Devlin estimated that the Libyan Regional Branch had between 50 and 150 members in 1964.

Following the coup d'état of 1969 against King Idris, a new revolutionary government was established, led by Muammar Gaddafi. The government was recognised as Nasserist because the new administration proclaimed its goal as "liberty, socialism and unity", rather than "unity, liberty, socialism" (the Ba'ath Party's slogan). This change in order was important because of the ideological split between the Ba'athists and the Nasserists. Following Gaddafi's revolution, several People's Committees were established. These committees (which at the beginning were led by the people) arrested several Ba'athists.

Amr Taher Deghayes, founder of the Libyan Ba'ath branch, was later arrested by Gaddafi's security forces and died after three days in jail. Deghayes' death allegedly sparked a large anti-government demonstration (which was crushed), followed by the imprisonment of several leading Ba'athists. In 1982, a trial began in which 25 Libyan Ba'athists were charged with membership in an illegal organisation and they were freed after torture. The following year, they were re-tried on the same charge: three were sentenced to death and others to life in prison. The arrests and trials of the 1980s led to the dissolution of the Libyan regional Ba'athist organisation.

== Legacy ==
The Libyan National Movement (LNM), an Arab nationalist organisation, was founded by Ba'athist lawyer 'Umran Burweiss. The LNM (still in existence) was originally financed by Iraqi Ba'athists and produced relatively high-quality propaganda materials. For example, it issued audio cassettes which were smuggled into Libya with Sawt at-Talia during the 1980s. The organisation also produced broadcasts for Radio Baghdad.

== Bibliography ==
- Leslie Simmons, Geoffrey (1993). Libya: The Struggle for Survival. Palgrave Macmillan. p. 166. ISBN 0-312-08997-X.
- Leslie Simmons, Geoffrey (1993). Libya: The Struggle for Survival. Palgrave Macmillan. p. 227. ISBN 0-312-08997-X.
- Wright, John (1981). Libya: A Modern History. Taylor & Francis. p. 227. ISBN 0-7099-2727-4.
- Wright, John (1981). Libya: A Modern History. Taylor & Francis. p. 94. ISBN 0-7099-2727-4.
- Wright, John (1981). Libya: A Modern History. Taylor & Francis. p. 96. ISBN 0-7099-2727-4.
- Devlin, John (1975). The Baath Party: a History from its Origins to 1966 (2nd ed.). Hoover Institute Press. p. 18. OCLC 884273607.
