= National Front Party (Libya) =

Political party in Libya

National Front Party حزب الجبهة الوطنية Hizb Al-Jabha Al-Wataniyya
- Leader: Mohammed Ali Abdallah
- Founder: Mohamed Yousef el-Magariaf
- Founded: 9 May 2012
- Preceded by: National Front for the Salvation of Libya
- Ideology: Liberalism; Libyan nationalism; Civic nationalism; Progressivism; Decentralization; Parliamentarianism
- Political position: Centre-left
- General National Congress: 3 / 200

Website
- www.jabha.ly

The National Front Party (Arabic: حزب الجبهة الوطنية, Hizb Al-Jabha Al-Wataniyya) is a political party in Libya, formed in May 2012. It is the successor to the National Front for the Salvation of Libya, an anti-Gaddafi resistance movement founded in 1981. Its ideology is considered liberal and progressive, and Libya Herald writer George Grant described the party as "arguably the most liberal-leaning of all in Congress."

NFP holds 3 seats in the General National Congress (GNC), making it the third largest party. Its leader, Mohamed el-Magariaf served as the President of the GNC from 9 August 2012 to 28 May 2013.

== Leadership ==
The party has a "High Leadership Committee" consisting of 16 members, headed by the party president.

At the first party congress, held in Benghazi, the former NFSL leader Mohammed Magariaf was elected president of the party.

On 9 August 2012, Magariaf resigned as party leader, after he was elected President of the General National Congress, making him provisional head of state. Mohamed Ali Darrat become acting president of NFP until Mohammed Ali Abdallah was elected head of the party.

== History ==
On 9 May 2012, the National Front for the Salvation of Libya (NFSL) transformed into a political party, named National Front Party (NFP).

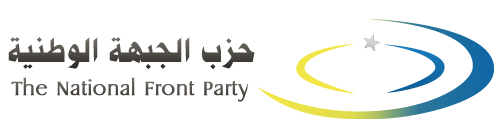
Old logo of the party

In the Libyan Congressional elections of 2012, NFP fielded 45 candidates, including 22 women. It received 4.08% of the popular vote and won 3 of the 80 party-list seats. Several of the 120 independents in the GNC are also affiliated with the party.

== Ideology ==
The NFP positions itself as a progressive, centre-left and liberal party promoting pluralism and democracy. It focuses on economic development, security, women's rights, and the welfare of the 2011 Libyan Civil War veterans and their families. It takes a hard line on the former figures of the Gaddafi government and declares that trying them in court is a prerequisite to national reconciliation. It favors a parliamentary system and a certain degree of decentralization, but rejects federalism.

It sees Islam as a broad guideline to the state's affairs, but does not mention the implementation of Islamic Sharia law.
