= Libyan Communist Party =

- Founded: 1945
- Dissolved: 1952
- Newspaper: Corriere del Lunedì
- Ideology: Communism; Marxism–Leninism
- Political position: Far-left

The Libyan Communist Party (Italian: Partito Comunista Libico, PCL; Arabic: حزب الشيوعي الليبي) was a Marxist–Leninist communist party in Libya.

Historically, Marxism came to Libya through bourgeois intellectuals who studied abroad and through Marxists that settled from Italy.

The party was established shortly after World War II, but the Libyan authorities began a crackdown on the party soon after the founding of the Communist Party in 1945. In November 1951, seven of its leaders were forced into exile including Nino Caruso and Valentino Parlato, and the Communist Party was under police surveillance. The party's headquarters was in Benghazi. The influence of the party was limited to a small group in Cyrenaica.

Communist militants took part in student demonstrations. In 1952 the government banned all political parties, forcing the party underground. A second wave of repression came with Gaddafi coming to power in 1969 and a subsequent wave of repression against communists. In 1973, during the Libyan cultural revolution, Gaddafi stated:

We must purge all the sick people who talk of Communism, atheism, who make propaganda for the Western countries and advocate capitalism. We shall put them in prison.
