= Libyan National Democratic Front =

The Libyan National Democratic Front (Arabic: الجبهة الليبية الوطنية الديمقراطية) was a Libyan political opposition organization. The organization was founded in the United States in August 1980, emerging out of the Democratic Libya Committee. The founding meeting elected a Central Committee and adopted the programmes of the organization. The organization coined the phrase "national democratic" which meant protecting the rights of the poor and middle classes, absolute national independence and democratic means of government. Some of its members had a Marxist ideological orientation. Compared to other Libyan opposition groups at the time, the Libyan National Democratic Front had a high degree of ideological and organizational consistency. The organization published the magazine al-Watan ('The Fatherland') on a regular basis. The first issue of al-Watan was issued in September 1980.

The organization had a very small membership, and did not grow much beyond its founding core. It did not expand its activities inside Libya. Key members included Dr. Adulrahim Saleh, Dr. Ali Tarhouni, Mahmoud Shammam (as of 2011 the Head of Information of the rebel National Transitional Council), Usama Endar, Hussien Dernawi, Mohamed Derbi, Salah Almegherbi, Fathi Al-Baaja, Sunussi Shaaliya, Dr. Mohamed Malhouf and Hasan Al-Ashhab, among others. The Libyan National Democratic Front advocated popular mobilization and thus creating revolutionary consciousness necessary to take on the Gaddafi government. The organization condemned all forms of exploitation and feudalism, and called for the interests of oppressed sectors to be defended.

Some of its members left the party and aligned themselves with efforts of unifying the Libyan opposition behind Major Abdel Moneim al-Houni. The grouping took part in the General Conference of National Democratic Forces in Geneva in November 1992. The group did not sign on the effort which led to the failed coup which was launched from Algeria. Core members were still active until the fall of the Gaddafi government in 2011. Mr. Dernawi was jailed for four months by the Gaddafi government from the middle of March until the middle June 2011. Mr. Endar is a founder of one of the post-Gaddafi political organizations based in Tripoli (Democratic National Front).
