= Democratic Party (Libya) =

Political party in Libya

Democratic Party الحزب الديمقراطي
- Chairperson: Mohamed Sowan
- Founder: Ahmed Shebani
- Founded: 14 July 2011
- Preceded by: Libyan Freedom and Democracy Campaign
- Ideology: Liberalism; Secularism; Minority rights
- Political position: Centre to centre-left
- Slogan: "Freedom and democracy for the Libyan people"

The Democratic Party (Arabic: الحزب الديمقراطي) is a political party in Libya launched by the Libyan Freedom and Democracy Campaign on 14 July 2011 to participate in post-Gaddafi and post-National Transitional Council elections.

== Ideology ==
The DPL's doctrine is a secularist and liberal one. It shares most of the policies of its predecessor, like supporting the National Transitional Council only as a useful expedient to help the transition to democracy, but noting that it does not have legal legitimacy, and demanding that the transition to democracy in Libya be overseen by a United Nations commission similar to the Adriaan Pelt commission at the end of World War II which oversaw the independence of Libya. The party has pro-Israeli points like the recognition of Israel It also supports freedom of return for Libyan Jews. The Democratic Party also support the separation of religion and statehood, with freedom of conscience and respect for all religions as the best way to defeat Islamic extremism and Al-Qaeda.

The party is currently working with many think tanks such as the club of Madrid, the Gorbachev Foundation and The Westminster Foundation for Democracy, to achieve its aims.
