= National Front for the Salvation of Libya =

Libyan political opposition group

National Front for the Salvation of Libya الجبهة الوطنية لإنقاذ ليبيا
- Flag of the NFSL Seal of the NFSL
- Dates active: 7 October 1981 – 9 May 2012
- Headquarters: Khartoum (until 1985)
- Active regions: Libya; Western Europe (1980s)
- Ideology: Anti-Gaddafism; Liberalism; Progressivism
- Political position: Centre-left

The National Front for the Salvation of Libya (NFSL) was a political opposition group active during the rule of the Gaddafi regime in Libya. It was formed in 1981 and called for major liberalising reforms such as democratic elections, a free press, and the separation of powers. During the 1980s, it pursued a campaign of armed opposition to the Gaddafi regime and made several coup attempts, the most notable being its 1984 armed assault on Gaddafi's Bab al-Azizia compound in Tripoli. After the failure of this and several other coup attempts the group largely abandoned militancy, and instead used peaceful tactics to promote reform in Libya; in 2005, the NFSL joined with six other groups to form the National Conference for the Libyan Opposition.

With the fall of the Gaddafi regime in the 2011 Libyan Civil War, the NFSL's main long-term goal was fulfilled. Consequently, after the war's end, the NFSL dissolved itself and was replaced by the National Front Party, which won 3 seats in the 2012 General National Congress election. The NFSL's founder and former leader, Mohamed Yousef el-Magariaf was appointed chairman of the General National Congress, effectively making him interim head of state.

== History ==
Mohamed Yousef el-Magariaf, a former Libyan ambassador to India, founded the NFSL on 7 October 1981, at a press conference held in Khartoum, Sudan. The group was allowed to operate out of Sudan until 1985, when the country's leader, Gaafar Nimeiry was ousted in a coup d'état. The NFSL launched a wide campaign to topple the regime of Muammar Gaddafi in Libya, establishing a short-wave radio station, a commando military training camp and also published a bi-monthly newsletter, Al Inqadh (Salvation). According to various sources, the group was supported by the government of Saudi Arabia, and the United States' Central Intelligence Agency.

On 17 April 1984, the NFSL organised a demonstration of Libyan dissidents outside the Libyan embassy in London. During the demonstration, shots were fired from the embassy into the group of protestors, striking eleven people, including one of the police officers controlling the demonstration, Yvonne Fletcher, who died shortly afterward. Fletcher's murder quickly led to the severing of diplomatic relations between Britain and Libya.

=== Military action ===
Three weeks after the embassy protest, on 8 May 1984, NFSL commandos took part in an attack on Gaddafi's Bab al-Azizia compound in Tripoli, in an attempt to assassinate the Libyan leader. The attack was thwarted when the group's leader, Ahmed Ibrahim Ihwas, was captured when trying to enter Libya at the Tunisian border. Although the coup attempt failed and Gaddafi escaped unscathed, dissident groups claimed that some eighty Libyans, Cubans, and East Germans had been killed in the operation. Some 2,000 people were arrested in Libya following the attack, and eight were hanged publicly.

As part of the investigation into the bombing of UTA Flight 772, Libyan intelligence claimed to have thwarted an attempted bombing campaign within Libya by the NFSL sometime in 1987. A Tunisian national was allegedly arrested in Tripoli in possession of a suitcase bomb similar to that used to destroy the UTC flight two years later.

NFSL continued its efforts to topple Gaddafi and formed the Libyan National Army (LNA), after a group of soldiers, taken prisoner by Chad during the Chadian–Libyan conflict, defected from the Libyan Army and joined the NFSL in 1987. The LNA was later evacuated from Chad after the President Hissène Habré was overthrown by one of his former officers, Idriss Déby, who was backed by Gaddafi. The NFSL had previously acted as a conduit between the Habré government and that of Saddam Hussain, who provided the Chadian military with arms captured from Iran during the then ongoing conflict.

A 1996 BBC Channel 4 investigative report linked the NFSL to another militant anti-Gaddafi group Al-Burkan which assassinated several Libyan diplomats in Europe during the 1980s.

=== Political opposition ===
Having apparently given up the idea of a military takeover, the NFSL continued its opposition to Gaddafi by media campaigns and forming political alliances with other opposition groups. The NFSL was one of seven other Libyan opposition groups that formed the National Conference for the Libyan Opposition (NCLO) which was founded in June 2005 at the first NCLO conference in London. The NFSL and three other organizations withdrew from this alliance in February 2008 citing differences of opinion. In a statement issued by the NFSL on 28 February 2008, the NFSL announced its withdrawal from the NCLO due to what it called "straying away from the 'National Accord of 2005'". The NFSL continued its media campaigns, primarily utilizing online mediums. Though relatively weaker than before, and without a clear method of carrying out its objective of toppling the Gaddafi regime, the NFSL continued to be recognized as the leading opposition movement to Col. Gaddafi's rule of Libya.

After the 2011 Libyan Civil War, the group's leaders were allowed to return to Libya. However, with the fall of the Gaddafi regime the NFSL lost its raison d'être, and thus it dissolved itself on 9 May 2012 and was replaced by the National Front Party, which won 3 seats in the General National Congress election, Libya's first free election in more than 40 years.

== Organization ==
The NFSL organizational structure was based on two primary bodies, the National Congress (المجلس الوطني) and the Permanent Bureau (المكتب الدائم). The National Congress was the highest authority in the NFSL. The Permanent Bureau was elected during National Congress sessions and represented the legislative authority when it was not in session. The Permanent Bureau was also responsible for overseeing the executive body of the NFSL. The executive committee (اللجنة التنفذية) was led by the secretary-general, who was also elected during National Congress sessions. The executive committee was made up of several Commissioners who each oversaw different programs of the opposition organization, as well as the Deputy Secretary-General.

At the time of the group's dissolution in 2012, the NFSL executive committee was led by Secretary-General Ibrahim Abdulaziz Sahad, who was re-elected for his second term during the 5th National Congress held in July 2007 in the United States. Sahad appointed Mohammed Ali Abdallah as his Deputy. The Permanent Bureau was led by Fawzi al-Tarabulsi, who had previously been elected vice president of the National Congress and became president upon Dr. Suleiman Abdalla's resignation as president in 2008. The Bureau's leadership also included Vice-President Mohamed Saad and Rapporteur of the Bureau Mohamed Ali Binwasil.

== Notable former members ==
- Mohammed Magariaf, former leader of the NFSL, since August 2012 President of the General National Congress and interim head of state
- Mustafa A.G. Abushagur, from November 2011 to November 2012 deputy prime minister in the interim cabinet, in November 2012 briefly Prime Minister-designate, but lost vote of confidence
- Ali Zeidan, since November 2012 Prime Minister
- Khalifa Haftar, former military leader in the NFSL, on 2 March 2015, he was appointed commander of the armed forces loyal to the Libyan House of Representatives in the midst of the Second Libyan Civil War

== See also ==
- Anti-Gaddafi forces
- Libyan Civil War
- Libyan National Liberation Army
- National Front Party
