= Libyan League for Human Rights =

Human rights organization

The Libyan League for Human Rights (LLHR) is a human rights organization in the Euro-Mediterranean Human Rights Network. LLHR was established on 2 March 1989 by Soliman Bouchuiguir, Hussein Raiani, Mohammad Zayyan, and Mansour Kikhia. According to the League's website, "Mansour Kikhia, former Libyan ambassador to the United Nations, had defected to the US in 1980 and, in December 1993, was kidnapped in Egypt and subsequently transported to Libya, where he is believed to have been executed."

As of 2001, LLHR was headquartered from Geneva, Switzerland, with branches in Bornheim, Germany, and in England. Since then, it has opened operations in North America.

The group opposes the death penalty in Libya and throughout the world. Since the beginning of the 2011 Libyan civil war, LLHR has issued statements condemning the violent crackdown on protesters and Gaddafi's use of rape, torture, and abduction as instruments of war. It has also addressed the UN Human Rights Council and European Union on human rights violations during the civil war. LLHR played a role in raising awareness surrounding the detention of American citizen Abdelgader Gibani in February 2011 and in encouraging Americans to call the State Department to facilitate his release. Gibani was released on 2 March 2011. On 27 January 2012, the Libyan League for Human Rights opened an investigation into all interactions between Libyans and US law enforcement agencies and related bodies (including the FBI, CIA, local law enforcement, TSA, and CBP, as well as the Department of Homeland Security and State Department) since February 2011. LLHR cited evidence that the FBI and other US law enforcement agencies had targeted Libyan-American citizens in their homes and workplaces as well as at US-Canada border crossings and airports throughout the US. In its statement regarding the investigation, LLHR indicated that two American citizens of Libyan origin were currently being prevented from entering the US. LLHR highlighted that these actions "directly undermine Articles 9 through 12 of the Universal Declaration for Human Rights (UDHR), which protect all human beings from arbitrary arrest, detention, and exile, and arbitrary interference with privacy," as well as "the rights of these individuals to freedom of movement and to return to their country of citizenship, as affirmed in Article 13 of the UDHR."
