= Libyan Freedom and Democracy Campaign =

The Libyan Freedom and Democracy Campaign
- Founded: February 2011
- Succeeded by: Democratic Party
- Ideology: Secularism; UN control of Libya until elections Establishment of a truth and reconciliation commission for Libya

The Libyan Freedom and Democracy Campaign was a secular political group during the Libyan Civil War. It established the Democratic Party (Libya) in July 2011. It supported the Separation of Church and State with Freedom of conscience as the best way to defeat Extremism and Al-Qaeda The group expressed doubts about the Interim National Council (INC), and especially its composition, and proposed the alternative route of the Adrian Pelt commission. This included support for the National Transitional Council to help expedite transition to democracy, overseen by a United Nations commission. The organisation also supported the deployment of UN peacekeeping forces, and the establishment of a commission similar to the Truth and Reconciliation Commission in South Africa. The campaign worked with many think tanks such as the Club of Madrid, The Gorbachev Foundation and Westminster Foundation for Democracy to achieve its goals.
