= Canton of La Canourgue =

Coordinates: 44.43°N 3.22°E

The canton of La Canourgue is an administrative division of the Lozère department, southern France. Its borders were modified at the French canton reorganisation which came into effect in March 2015. Its seat is in La Canourgue.

It consists of the following communes:

1. Banassac-Canilhac
2. La Canourgue
3. Chanac
4. Laval-du-Tarn
5. La Malène
6. Massegros Causses Gorges
7. Saint-Saturnin
8. La Tieule
