= List of ambassadors of Libya to France =

Coordinates: 48.847917°N 2.304861°E

Between 1958 and the outbreak of the Libyan civil war in 2011, there were twelve ambassadors appointed by the Libyan government to serve in France. Subsequent postholders have represented the National Transitional Council.

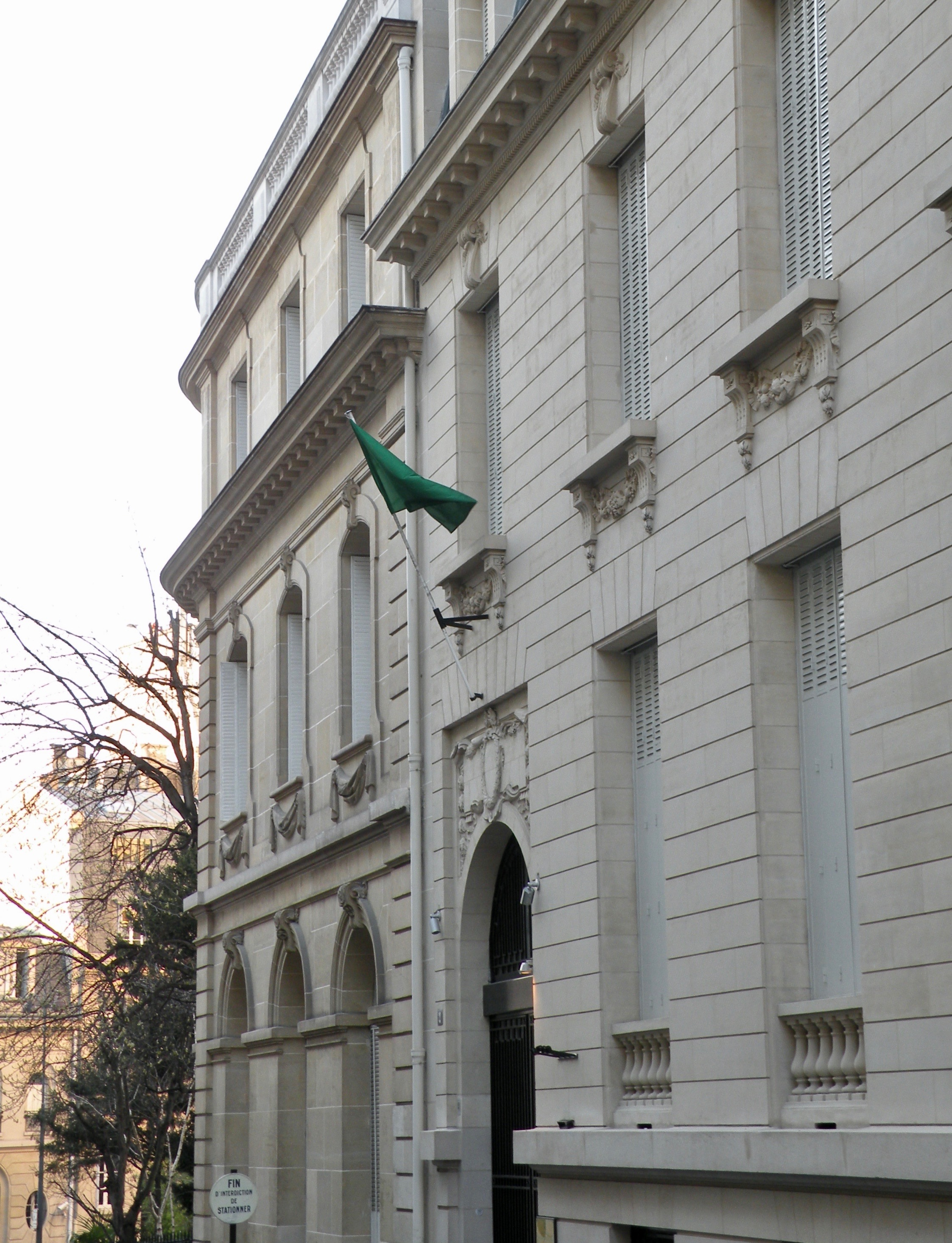
The Libyan Ambassador to France has his residence in Paris. (fr:Ambassade de Libye en France)

Designated/ accredited	Ambassador	Notes	Libyan head of government	President of France	Term end
June 5, 1958	Mustafa Ben Halim		Idris of Libya	René Coty	
1961	Ali Jerbi	On leaving this post he was appointed Minister for Foreign Affairs.	Idris of Libya	Charles de Gaulle	December 19, 1966
December 19, 1966	Taher Caramanli	Former mayor of Tripoli and former ambassador in Athens and Ankara.	Idris of Libya	Charles de Gaulle	
1968	Abdulhamid al-Bakkush		Idris of Libya	Charles de Gaulle	
July 13, 1971	Kadri El Attrach		Muammar Gaddafi	Georges Pompidou	
December 23, 1975	Kamel Maghur		Muammar Gaddafi	Valéry Giscard d’Estaing	
February 16, 1978	Ashour Gargoum		Muammar Gaddafi	Valéry Giscard d’Estaing	
March 25, 1985	Hamed Ahmed El-Houderi		Mifta al-Usta Umar	François Mitterrand	
March 27, 1995	Ali Treki		Abdul Majid al-Qa′ud	Jacques Chirac	
May 9, 2000	Abdessalam Ali El Mazoughi		Muhammad Ahmad al-Mangoush	Jacques Chirac	
April 20, 2004	Mohamed Abdellah Al-Harari		Shukri Ghanem	Jacques Chirac	
January 15, 2010	Mohamed Salaheddine Zarem	Resigned on 25 February 2011, after the intrusion into the embassy of activists supporting the rebels during the Libyan civil war.	Baghdadi Mahmudi	Nicolas Sarkozy	February 25, 2011
August 8, 2011	Mansur Saif Al-Nasr	"August 8, 2011, the keys to the embassy are handed to Mansur Saif Al-Nasr, representative of the National Transitional Council recently recognized by France."	Mustafa Abdul Jalil	Nicolas Sarkozy	
December 22, 2011	Alshiabani Mansour Abuhamoud	Born December 8, 1974 in Al-Guira	Mustafa Abdul Jalil	Nicolas Sarkozy	

== Source ==
- Legifrance | Accueil | Les autres textes législatifs et réglementaires | Remise de lettres de créance
