= Ali Aujali =

Libyan diplomat (born 1944)

Ali Aujali علي الأوجلي
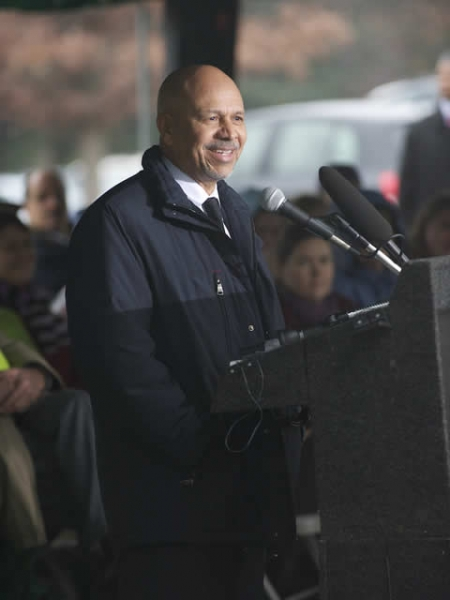
- Aujali delivers remarks at a memorial service for Pan Am Flight 103

Foreign Minister of Libya
- In office 27 November 2012 – 2 January 2013
- President: Mohamed Yousef el-Magariaf
- Prime Minister: Ali Zeidan
- Preceded by: Ashour Bin Khayal

Libyan Ambassador to United States
- In office 2009–2012
- President: Muammar Gaddafi (Leader); Mustafa Abdul Jalil
- Prime Minister: Baghdadi Mahmudi; Mahmoud Jibril; Ali Tarhouni (Acting); Abdurrahim El-Keib
- Succeeded by: Wafa Bughaighis

Libyan Chargé d'Affaires to Canada
- In office 2004–2009
- Prime Minister: Shukri Ghanem; Baghdadi Mahmudi
- Leader: Muammar Gaddafi

Libyan Ambassador to Brazil
- In office 1988–1994
- Prime Minister: Umar Mustafa al-Muntasir; Abuzed Omar Dorda; Abdul Majid al-Qa′ud
- Leader: Muammar Gaddafi

Libyan Ambassador to Argentina
- In office 1984–1988
- Prime Minister: Jadallah Azzuz at-Talhi; Muhammad az-Zaruq Rajab; Jadallah Azzuz at-Talhi; Umar Mustafa al-Muntasir
- Leader: Muammar Gaddafi

Libyan Ambassador to Malaysia
- In office 1981–1984
- Prime Minister: Jadallah Azzuz at-Talhi
- Leader: Muammar Gaddafi

Personal details
- Born: 1944 (age 81–82) Benghazi, Libya
- Party: Independent
- Education: Benghazi University
- Profession: Diplomat
- Website: Official website

Ali Suleiman Aujali (Arabic: علي الأوجلي, alternatively transliterated Ojli and Adjali; born 1944) is a Libyan diplomat who formerly served successively as Libya's ambassador to Malaysia, Argentina, Brazil and the United States. He served as ambassador under the Gaddafi regime, as well as the governments of the National Transitional Council, and the General National Congress. He declined the post of foreign minister under Prime Minister Ali Zeidan in the government of the General National Congress.

== Early life and education ==
Born in Benghazi in 1944, he received his BA in Business Administration from the Benghazi University.

== Career ==
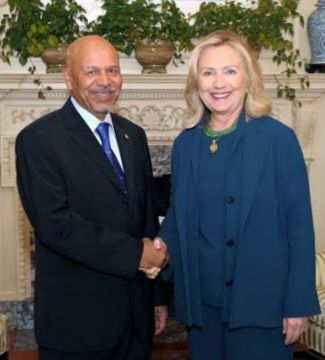
Aujali with Hillary Clinton in 2011

Aujali was first posted to the Libyan embassy in London as Third Secretary in 1971. In 1976 he was posted to the Libyan embassy in Kuala Lumpur, Malaysia, before being promoted in 1981 to the post of Ambassador to Malaysia. Subsequently, Aujali was the Libyan ambassador to Argentina (1984–1988) and then Brazil (1988–1994). As Ambassador to the United States from 2005 to 2011 for the Gaddafi government, he was also known for defending the return of Abdelbaset al-Megrahi to Libya. He also served as the chargé d'affaires to Canada (2001 to 2004).

Aujali was formerly Ambassador to the United States on behalf of the National Transitional Council from 15 August 2011 to 1 November 2012. He previously held the position on behalf of the Gaddafi government from January 2009 until February 2011, when he resigned in the wake of the Libyan Civil War. He joined the opposition National Transitional Council soon after; on 9 August the U.S. State Department confirmed that it had handed the Libyan embassy in Washington, D.C. to the NTC, and Aujali was re-accredited by the United States as Libya's Ambassador on 15 August 2011.

In the October 2012 meeting of the General National Congress (GNC), Aujali was chosen to continue to be Ambassador to the United States. and subsequently was nominated for minister of foreign affairs by Ali Zidan at the end of October 2012. Although cabinet minister are sworn in on 14 November 2013, he could not since his investigation by the commission regarding his ties to former ruler of Libya, Muammar Gaddafi, was not completed until that day. The commission cleared him on 27 November. However, he was not sworn in and resigned on 31 December 2012. He continued in 2013 to be Libya's ambassador to the U.S., being succeeded by Ms. Wafa Bughaighis in November 2017.

In 2018, Aujali joined the board of the National Council on US Libya Relations (NCULSR).

== Press ==
- Aujali, Ali Suleiman (31 March 2011). "How to help free Libya". The Washington Post.
- Hilleary, Cecily (9 March 2011). "Libya's Former US Ambassador Says West Should Intervene". Voice of America (VOA).
- Debono, James (2 March 2011). "Ali Suleiman Aujali - the new face of the revolution?". Malta Today. Archived from the original on 7 May 2011.
- "Libyan Envoy Aujali: Gadhafi Has 'No Place to Go'". PBS Newshour. 22 March 2011. Archived from the original on 7 November 2021.
- "Rebranding Libya - Ali Suleiman Aujali". The Daily Show With Jon Stewart. Comedy Central (ViacomCBS). 31 March 2011. Archived from the original on 7 October 2011. No archive found.
- Olgiati, Christopher (3 February 2014). "Libya: Muammar Gaddafi's secrets finally revealed". BBC News.
