= Muhammad az-Zanati =

Libyan politician (1936/1937–2025)

Muhammad al-Zanati الزناتي إمحمد الزناتي
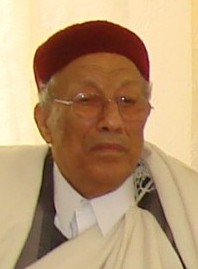
- Muhammad al-Zanati in 2007

Secretary General of the General People's Congress of Libya
- In office 18 November 1992 – 3 March 2008
- Prime Minister: Abuzed Omar Dorda; Abdul Majid al-Qa′ud; Muhammad Ahmad al-Mangoush; Mubarak Abdallah al-Shamikh; Shukri Ghanem; Baghdadi Mahmudi
- Leader: Muammar Gaddafi
- Preceded by: Abdul Razzaq as-Sawsa
- Succeeded by: Miftah Muhammed K'eba

Personal details
- Born: 1936 or 1937 Sirte, Italian Libya
- Died: 26 May 2025 (aged 88) Cairo, Egypt

Muhammad al-Zanati (Arabic: الزناتي إمحمد الزناتي Az-Zanati al-Muhammad az-Zanati; 1936/1937 – 26 May 2025) was a Libyan politician who was the General Secretary of the General People's Congress, and the head of state of Libya from 18 January 1992 until 3 March 2008. He was reappointed on 1 March 2000. He was of the Qadhadhfa branch of the Houara tribe. Az-Zanati died on 26 May 2025, at the age of 88.
