= Tayeb El-Safi =

Libyan political operative (born 1954)

Tayeb el-Safi (Arabic: الطيب الصافي; born 1954) is a Libyan political operative. He briefly served as minister of economy and trade and was one of the closest aides of former Libyan leader Muammar Gaddafi during the Libyan Civil War. He was unknown to the public until a series of calls were leaked by Al Jazeera. Before returning to Libyan politics in 2016, El-Safi, along with 50,000 other Gaddafi loyalists, fled to Egypt.

== Biography ==
El-Safi is a native of Tobruk and later spent time in Tajura, where he caught the attention of Gaddafi.

In the 1980s, he had several international postings, primarily in Europe, at a time when Gaddafi's "stray dog" policy was in effect, a policy in which many anti-Gaddafi dissidents were being assassinated extrajudicially. He was a shadowy figure who was virtually unknown by both Libyans and international observers until frequent communications between him and senior leadership of Gaddafi's government, including Gaddafi, Abdullah Senussi, Saif al-Islam Gaddafi, and Baghdadi Mahmudi, were leaked by Al Jazeera in 2012. El-Safi took a key role in attempting to put down the anti-Gaddafi opposition and orchestrated pro-Gaddafi propaganda and rallies. After the fall of Tripoli, El-Safi fled to Egypt. He was among an estimated 50,000 Gaddafi loyalists who fled to Egypt and among the most high-profile, along with Tohami Khaled, Ali Treki, and Ahmed Gaddaf al-Dam. Despite the request of the National Transitional Council, he was not extradited for trial.

In 2016, El-Safi returned to Libyan politics and aligned himself with Khalifa Haftar's Operation Dignity. Haftar's Air Force head Fakir Jarroushi confirmed that El-Safi had returned to Libya and had a meeting with Haftar in Marj. El-Safi publicly called for "comprehensive reconciliation" between the three rival governments in Libya and Gaddafi loyalists. He also criticized the UN-sponsored Skhirat Agreement that created the Government of National Accord as lacking legitimacy and the GNA-appointed Prime Minister Fayez al-Sarraj as only having legality from international support rather than "legality from the Libyan people." The following year, El-Safi claimed Saif al-Islam Gaddafi was released from prison due to a general amnesty and was with his family and tribe.

In May 2018, prominent Gaddafi loyalists, including El-Safi, Abdul Majid al-Qa′ud, Mohamed Abu al-Qasim al-Zwai, Mustafa Zaidi, and Saleh Rajab, publicly organized a forum in Haftar-controlled Benghazi named "The Preparatory Forum for National Forces," where they announced their support for Haftar and claimed that they wanted to save Libya from "terrorism, chaos, and foreign intervention."
