= Mansour Kikhia =

Mansour El-Kikhia may refer to:

- Mansour Omar El-Kikhia, Libyan-American author, columnist, activist and professor of political science
- Mansour Rashid El-Kikhia (1931 – c. 1993), Libyan Minister of Foreign Affairs and ambassador
- Mansour Mohamed El-Kikhia (born 1936), academic and politician, Member of the interim Libyan National Transitional Council
