= Fathi Omar El-Kikhia =

Libyan lawyer, politician and diplomat

- فتحى عمر الكيخيا
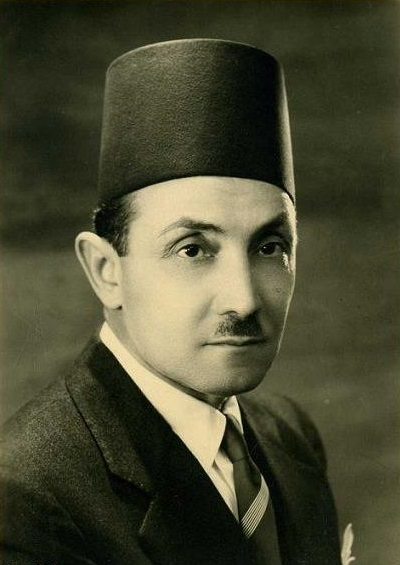
- El-Kikhia in 1949

Deputy Prime Minister of Libya
- In office 25 December 1951 – 15 February 1954
- Monarch: Idris
- Prime Minister: Mahmud al-Muntasir
- Preceded by: Office established
- Succeeded by: Abdul Majid Kabar (1955)

Prime Minister of Cyrenaica
- In office 5 July 1949 – 7 September 1949
- Monarch: Idris
- Preceded by: Office established
- Succeeded by: Omar Pasha El-Kikhia
Diplomatic offices 1954‍–‍1958
Envoy Extraordinary and Minister Plenipotentiary to the United States of America (United Kingdom of Libya)
In office 21 March 1954 – 7 August 1958
Monarch	Idris
Ambassador to the Italian Republic (United Kingdom of Libya)
In office 18 February 1954 – 21 March 1954
Monarch	Idris
Ministerial offices 1949‍–‍1954
Minister of Justice (United Kingdom of Libya) (Note: As Minister of Education and Justice from 25 December 1951 to 14 May 1952; succeeded in the education portfolio by Muhammad Sakizli.)
In office 25 December 1951 – 15 February 1954
Preceded by	Office established
Succeeded by	Abdulrahman Qalhud
Minister of Justice, Education and Defence (Emirate of Cyrenaica)
In office 5 July 1949 – 7 September 1949
Monarch	Idris
Prime Minister	Himself
Preceded by	Office established
Succeeded by	Muhammad Sakizli (Note: As Minister of Justice.)

Personal details
- Born: Fathi Omar Mansour El-Kikhia; 1901 Benghazi, Ottoman Tripolitania
- Died: 7 August 1958 (aged 56–57) Washington, D.C., United States of America
- Resting place: Sidi Daoud, Benghazi, Libya
- Spouse(s): Fathia Karima Mahmoud Khairy Pasha (m. 1938; div. 1952) Naila Mustakim (m. 1957)
- Relations: Omar Pasha El-Kikhia (father); Mansour Omar El-Kikhia (brother)
- Education: Sorbonne University
- Occupation: Lawyer; politician; diplomat

Fathi Bey Omar Pasha Mansour El-Kikhia (Arabic: فتحي بي عمر باشا منصور الكيخيا; 1901 – 7 August 1958) was a Libyan lawyer, politician and diplomat who served as the first prime minister of Cyrenaica from July to September 1949 and the first deputy prime minister of Libya from December 1951 to February 1954. He served as the acting prime minister of Libya on several occasions between 1951 and 1954.

== Early life and career ==
Fathi Omar Mansour El-Kikhia was born in Benghazi, Cyrenaica, Ottoman Tripolitania, in 1901. A member of the Karaghla tribe, he is the eldest son of the head of the tribe Omar Pasha El-Kikhia, an influential Cyrenaican nobleman. From 1912, he was educated at the Collège des Frères in Alexandria, Egypt, completing his secondary education there in 1919. He then studied at Sorbonne University in Paris, France, where he obtained a law degree in 1925. El-Kikhia then studied in the United States, France and Italy, which is where he received a doctorate of law.

Following his studies, El-Kikhia returned to Benghazi in what had by then become Italian Libya. A leading campaigner of Libyan independence alongside his father Omar Pasha, he was detained by the colonial authorities on his return, being imprisoned as a political prisoner for thirty months at Burj Shuwailik, a detention centre in the Benina area of the city, with other important individuals from the city, including Ali Pasha Al-Obaidi, Al-Senussi Jabr, Saleh Jaouda and Muhammad Mansour El-Kikhia. He then fled to Egypt, which is where he settled. In Egypt, El-Kikhia founded a law firm in Alexandria and practiced as a lawyer for the Mixed Courts. In addition to his native Arabic, El-Kikhia would become a fluent speaker of English, French and Italian during this period.

== Political career ==
=== Prime Minister of Cyrenaica ===
El-Kikhia returned to Libya at the end of the 1940s, after the end of World War II. During the war, the British government had promised to grant Libya its independence if Libyan resistance fighters joined the Allies to fight the Axis powers. The United Kingdom defeated the Italians in Libya in 1943 and had controlled part of the region since then. Following his return to Libya, El-Kikhia became one of several prominent campaigners who called on the United Kingdom to fulfill its promise and grant its territories in Libya independence.

In 1949, the United Kingdom agreed to grant Libya's Cyrenaica province autonomy over its own affairs. In March of that year, the local leader Idris al-Senussi declared the establishment of the independent Emirate of Cyrenaica with British support; although nominally an independent state, Britain maintained its military presence in the emirate and control of its foreign affairs. Idris decided to appoint El-Kikhia as the emirate's first prime minister because of his family connections, legal expertise and his perceived political neutrality, which Idris believed would prevent the emergence of partisan conflict in the country. Idris publicly invited El-Kikhia to form a government on 5 July. Although initially reluctant, El-Kikhia was convinced to accept Idris's offer by his father Omar Pasha, becoming the emirate's first prime minister. Idris also appointed him as the minister of justice, education and defence.

El-Kikhia's cabinet (Note: The cabinet of Cyrenaica was officially known as the Council of Ministers.) was formed in September 1949. In addition to El-Kikhia, its other members included Sayed Ali Assad al-Jerbi, who was appointed as minister of public works and communications, Sayed Saadallah ibn Saud, who was appointed as minister of interior, Sayed Mohamed Bu Dajaja, who was appointed as minister of finance, Sayed Hussein Maziq, who was appointed as minister of agriculture and forests, and Sayid Khalil el Qallal, who was appointed minister of public health.

On 9 July 1949, El-Kikhia and Idris travelled to London to engage in a series of negotiations with the British government on the functional independence of Cyrenaica and its new constitution. In the negotiations, El-Kikhia took a hardline against the British negotiators, enabling Idris to secure several concessions from the British government on the new emirate. However, the agreed constitution of the new emirate was not to El-Kikhia's favour. He disagreed with the contents of the constitution, which he believed empowered the monarch at the expense of the prime minister, who was made a figurehead. At the end of the negotiations, El-Kikhia joined Idris in Paris, where he was resting before his return to Cyrenaica. When Idris continued on his journey, El-Kikhia decided to remain in Paris. In Paris, he decided to resign as prime minister and settle back to Egypt, having fallen ill and disagreed with the new constitution and the extent of British influence on the affairs of the emirate. His resignation was also influenced by his wife, who did not want to live in Benghazi. Idris received and accepted his resignation on 7 September 1949 and appointed El-Kikhia's father Omar Pasha to succeed him as the new prime minister. El-Kikhia resigned before the new constitution came into force on 16 September, meaning that he could not swear an oath of office. As such, he is sometimes not considered the first prime minister of Cyrenaica, with that accolade going to his father Omar Pasha instead.

=== Deputy Prime Minister of Libya ===
Following his resignation as prime minister of Cyrenaica, El-Kikhia returned to Alexandria where he resumed his legal career. When Libya became independent in 1951, his father Omar Pasha convinced him to end his legal career in Egypt and return to Libya. The first prime minister of the country, Mahmud al-Muntasir appointed him to his cabinet as the first deputy prime minister and minister of education and justice. In al-Muntasir's first cabinet reshuffle on 14 May 1952, El-Kikhia remained deputy prime minister and minister of justice, with his education portfolio granted to Muhammad Sakizli. On several occasions, El-Kikhia served as acting prime minister while al-Muntasir recovered from ill health. He also acted as the minister of foreign affairs when the need arose. In government, he used his experience as a lawyer to draw up and enact new laws for the newly independent country, many of which remained in force following the rule of Muammar Gaddafi and the Libyan civil war in 2011. He also presided over the creation of the Libyan Supreme Court on 11 January 1954, which was made up of judges from Egypt, Libya, England and, at his insistence, America.

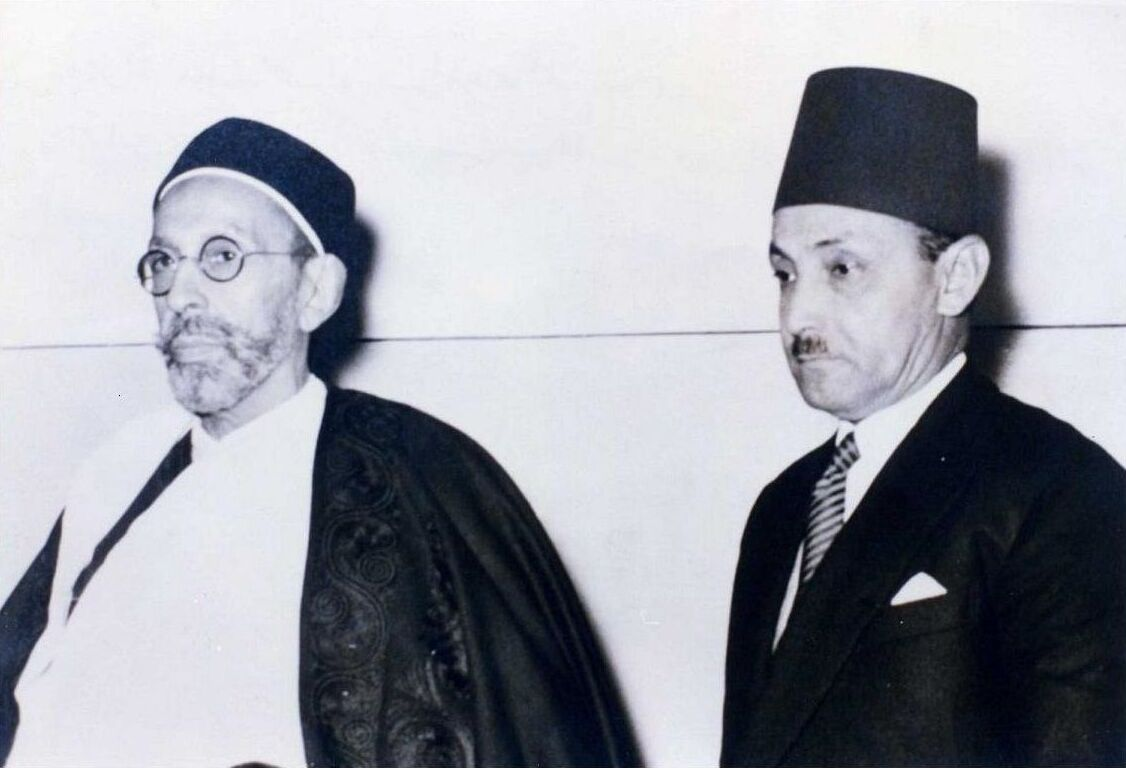
El-Kikhia (right) with King Idris in 1953

Publicly, El-Kikhia lacked the popularity of his compatriots in Cyrenaica. He was seen by many of the local populace as having been "Egyptianised" in his conduct and apparel. Despite this, El-Kikhia was known for being more sympathetic to Cyrenaica than the two other provinces in Libya, Tripolitania and Fezzan, coming from Cyrenaica himself. He was known to envy the popularity of the prime minister al-Muntasir and wielded influence over Taher Bey Karamanli, his brother-in-law. In February 1954, El-Kikhia opposed al-Muntasir's attempts to ally Libya with France, which maintained a military force in the Fezzan region. Whereas al-Muntasir wanted to ally with the French, having formed a close relationship with the French ambassador to Libya, El-Kikhia wanted to end the French influence in Fezzan and believed that an alliance between Libya and France was not acceptable to the general populace of Libya. Al-Muntasir eventually resigned over the issue on 15 February 1954.

=== Ambassador to Italy and America ===
Following al-Muntasir's resignation on 15 February 1954, Idris considered appointing El-Kikhia as the new prime minister. However, El-Kikhia had fallen out of favour by this time, and Idris ultimately appointed Sakizli as the new prime minister on 18 February 1954. Idris pursued the agreement of the United States of America in appointing El-Kikhia as Libya's ambassador to the country. In the meantime, he was appointed as Libya's ambassador to Italy, a role in which he served for only a short time. He was not given a role in the government of Sakizli.

El-Kikhia was appointed as the envoy extraordinary and minister plenipotentiary to the United States of America on 21 March 1954, making him Libya's first ambassador to the country. He relocated to Washington, D.C., where he remained until his death in 1958. As Libya's ambassador to the United States, El-Kikhia successfully negotiated continued American presence at the Wheelus Air Base near Tripoli. He was also responsible for developing the United States' student exchange programme with Libya.

== Personal life and death ==
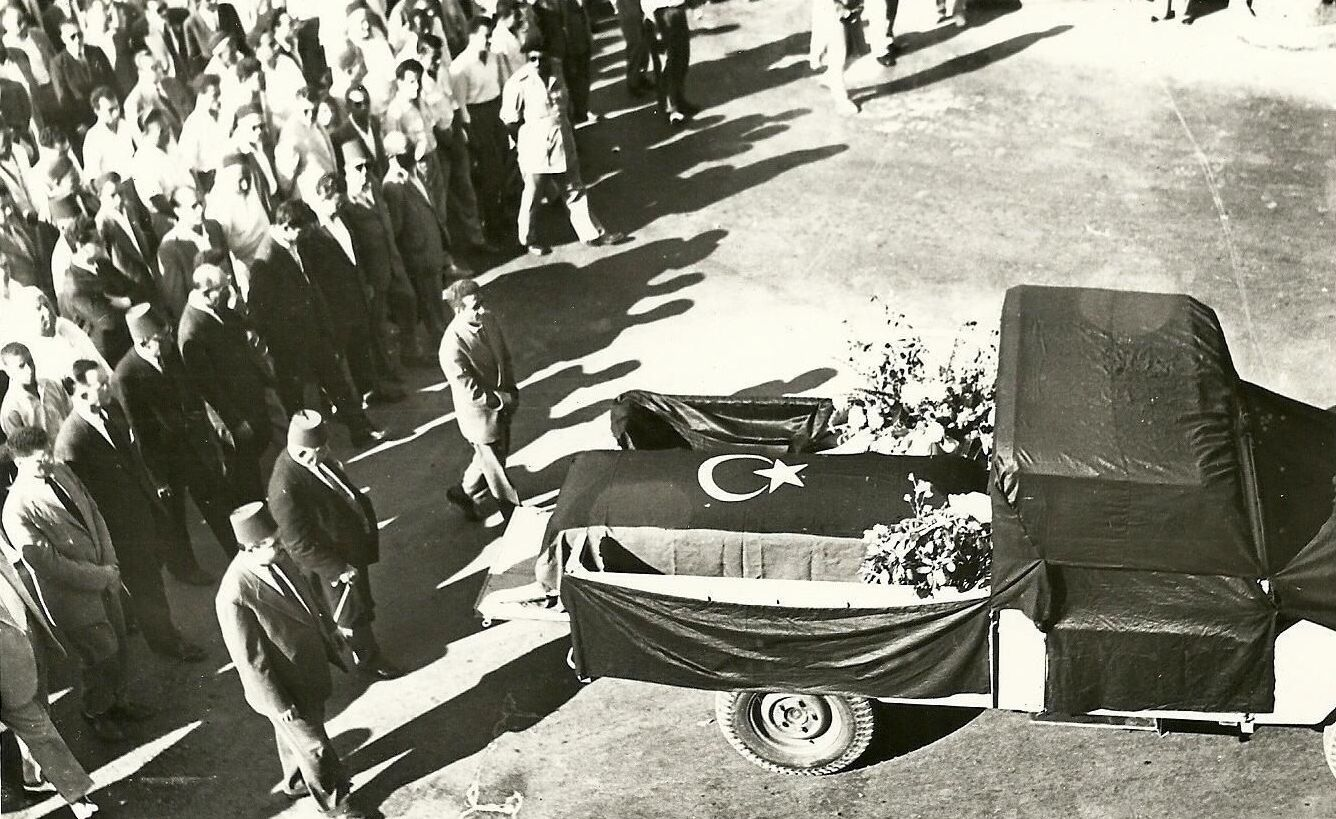
El-Kikhia's funeral in August 1958

In 1938, El-Kikhia married the daughter of an Egyptian nobleman, Fathia Karima Mahmoud Khairy Pasha. The couple divorced in 1952, with El-Kikhia marrying a second time in 1957 to Naila Mustakim, a woman from Jordan. He had no children.

In 1958, El-Kikhia fell ill whilst in Washington, D.C. He died at Georgetown University Hospital on 7 August 1958 after a surgical operation. He was survived by his wife, Naila Mustakim El-Kikhia. Following his death, his body was moved to Benghazi, where a state funeral was held with his father in attendance. He was buried at the Sidi Daoud cemetery in Benghazi.

== Honours ==
El-Kikhia was a member of the Order of Independence

El-Kikhia was addressed by the honorific titles of bey and pasha. During his tenure as Libya's ambassador to Italy, he was awarded the Order of Merit of the Italian Republic for encouraging economic and cultural ties between Libya and Italy. He was also a member of the Order of Independence.
