= Libyan Ambassador to the United Nations =

Permanent Representative of Libya to the United Nations
- Seal of Libya
- Incumbent; Lamia Abusedra since May 2022
- Style: His/Her Excellency

The permanent representative of Libya to the United Nations is the leader of the Libyan delegation to the United Nations, and in charge of the Libyan Mission to the United Nations. Libyan representatives to the UN hold the personal rank of ambassador.

The Permanent Representative, currently Elmahdi S. Elmajerbi, is charged with representing the Libyan government in the United Nations and during almost all plenary meetings of the General Assembly, except in the rare situation in which a senior personnel of the Libyan government (such as the Libyan Foreign Secretary or the Libyan Head of State) is present.

Taher Al-Sunni is the permeant representative under the command of the Presidential Council led by Mohamed al-Menfi.

== List of Ambassadors ==
The following is a chronological list of those who have held the office:

#	Ambassador	Years served	Head of State
1	Wahbi al-Bouri	1963–1965 1965–1970	Idris of Libya
—	—	—	Idris of Libya/Muammar Gaddafi
	Mahmood Suleiman Maghribi	1971–1975	Muammar Gaddafi
2	Mansour Rashid El-Kikhia	1975–1980	Muammar Gaddafi
2	Mansour Rashid El-Kikhia	1975–1980	Muammar Gaddafi
—	—	—	Muammar Gaddafi
3	Abuzed Omar Dorda	1997–2003	Muammar Gaddafi
4	Ali Treki	September 18, 2003 – March 4, 2009	Muammar Gaddafi
5	Giadalla Azzuz Belgassem Ettalhi	July 2007 – December 2008	Muammar Gaddafi
6	Abdel Rahman Shalgham	March 4, 2009 – July 23, 2013	Muammar Gaddafi/ Mustafa Abdul Jalil/ Mohammed Magariaf and Nouri Abusahmain
7	Ibrahim Dabbashi	July 23, 2013 – August, 2016	Nouri Abusahmain/ Fayez al-Sarraj
8	Elmahdi S. Elmajerbi (Chargé d'affaires)	August 2016 – December 2019	Fayez al-Sarraj
9	Taher Al-Sunni	January 2020 – April 2022	Fayez al-Sarraj/Mohamed al-Menfi
10	Lamia Abusedra	May 2022 – present	Mohamed al-Menfi
