= Cabinet of Fathi Omar El-Kikhia =

Fathi Omar El-Kikhia Cabinet
- First Council of Ministers of Cyrenaica

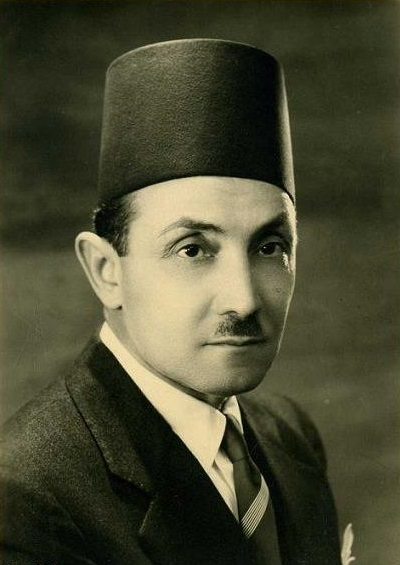
- El-Kikhia in 1949
- Date formed: 1 September 1949
- Date dissolved: 7 September 1949

People and organisations
- Emir: Idris
- Prime Minister: Fathi Omar El-Kikhia

History
- Predecessor: N/A
- Successor: Omar Pasha El-Kikhia Cabinet

Idris of Cyrenaica invited Fathi Omar El-Kikhia to form a government in July 1949, following the independence of the Emirate of Cyrenaica in March 1949. His cabinet was formed in September 1949.

El-Kikhia resigned as prime minister on 7 September 1949 and Idris appointed his father Omar Pasha El-Kikhia to succeed him. Omar Pasha's cabinet was formed in November 1949.

== Members ==
Fathi Omar El-Kikhia Cabinet
Post	Portrait	Incumbent	Term
Prime Minister of Cyrenaica; Minister of Justice, Education and Defence		Fathi Omar El-Kikhia	July 1949 – September 1949
Minister of Interior		Sayed Saadallah ibn Saud	September 1949
Minister of Public Works and Communications		Sayed Ali Assad al-Jerbi	September 1949
Minister of Finance		Sayed Mohamed Bu Dajaja	September 1949
Minister of Public Health		Sayed Khalil Omar el Qallal	September 1949
Minister of Agriculture and Forests		Sayed Hussein Maziq	September 1949
