= Mansour Rashid El-Kikhia =

Libyan ambassador (1931–1993)

- Born: December 1931; Benghazi, Libya
- Died: after 10 December 1993; Egypt
- Body discovered: October 2012
- Occupation: Minister of Foreign Affairs for Libya
- Known for: forced disappearance and subsequent death under unclear circumstances

Mansour Rashid Kikhia (also spelled Mansur, Arabic: منصور الكيخيا; December 1931 – c. 1993) was the Libyan Minister of Foreign Affairs (1972–1973), Libyan Ambassador to the United Nations, Permanent Libyan Representative to the United Nations (1975–1980), and later an opposition figure to Libya's leader Muammar Gaddafi, and human rights activist.

== Biography ==
He was born in Benghazi, Libya in 1931 to a family of Syrian origin from Aleppo. As a child, he studied in his hometown Benghazi before being sent to Egypt to attend high school and graduated from a university in 1950. al-Kikhia received a degree in International Law from Paris-Sorbonne University.

In 1962, he joined the Libyan Embassy in France and then, in Algeria in 1963. He was made Libyan General Consul to the UN office in Geneva (1963–1967) and a member of the Libyan Mission to the United Nations in 1968.

After the 1969 Libya coup, he went on to occupy important posts in the new government. During the early 1970s, he stood up for his principles and defended prisoners rights despite the risk. From 1972 to 1973, he served as foreign minister and later Libyan permanent representative to the UN from 1975 to 1980. He resigned in 1980 in protest against the Gaddafi regime's policies of summary executions practiced by the Libyan government at the time through the so-called revolutionary committees.

He moved to the United States in 1980 and applied for American citizenship. He was married to an American, Baha Omary Khikia, where they lived in Vienna, Virginia. During exile, he founded the Libyan Human Rights Association in 1984. Two years later, he established the Libyan National Alliance and was elected as secretary general.

== Disappearance in Egypt and Discovery of Body ==
On 10 December 1993, he vanished mysteriously after participating in an Arab Organization for Human Rights Board of Trustees meeting in Cairo. Eyewitnesses at the time reported that he was seen drinking coffee with two men believed to be working for Egypt's Mukhabarat and was abducted by three men in a black limousine with diplomatic license plates a few yards from the Safir Hotel Cairo where he was staying. Neither the Egyptian nor the Libyan authorities issued reports or claimed responsibility regarding this forced disappearance, ever. A four-year investigation conducted by the CIA, which was concluded in August 1997, produced convincing evidence that Egyptian agents staged the abduction and forcibly escorted al-Kikhia to the residence of Ibrahim Bishari, Libyan ambassador to the Arab League where he was interrogated by Abdullah Senussi, then to the Libyan authorities, who executed him. His body was found in October 2012 inside a refrigerator of a villa in Tripoli belonging to the former military intelligence after former Libyan intelligence chief, Abdullah Senussi; his death still remain a mystery. Some have speculated that he died during the events at Abu Salim prison; while others claim that he died in prison as a result of medical negligence.

Khikia was provided a state funeral in Benghazi and a memorial service held in his honour on 3 December 2012.

== Egyptian government accusations ==
The similarity between Reda Helal and Kikhia cases has raised widespread suspicion about the involvement of high-ranking Egyptian officials. Kikhia's lawyer does not rule out Libyan and American involvement in his disappearance. The recent arrest in London of a highly respected Egyptian engineer, Professor Momdouh Hamza, has implicated four top Egyptian officials with close ties to the Mubarak family and re-opened the rumor mill in Cairo. For years Egyptians have heard of forced disappearance of public figures elsewhere in the region (e.g. Iraq, Syria and Libya), but not their own.

== Personal life ==
He was the cousin of Libyan-American academic Mansour Omar El-Kikhia, whose father, Omar Pasha Mansour El-Kikhia, was the first prime minister of Cyrenaica.

He married a Syrian-American artist Baha al-Omary, with whom he had four children.

== See also ==
- List of kidnappings (1990–1999)
- List of solved missing person cases (1990s)
- List of unsolved deaths
- Reda Helal
