= Mohammed Ali Salim =

Libyan politician (1934/1935–2022)

Head of State of Libya
- In office 8 August 2012 – 9 August 2012
- Prime Minister: Abdurrahim El-Keib
- Preceded by: Mustafa Abdul Jalil (as Chairman of the National Transitional Council)
- Succeeded by: Mohammed Magariaf

President of the General National Congress
- Acting; 8 August 2012 – 9 August 2012
- Preceded by: Mohamed Abu al-Qasim al-Zwai (2011; as Secretary General of General People's Congress)
- Succeeded by: Mohammed Magariaf

Member of the General National Congress
- In office 8 August 2012 – 8 August 2014
- Preceded by: Congress established
- Succeeded by: Congress abolished
- Constituency: Qasr Al-AKhiar

Personal details
- Born: 1935
- Died: 28 January 2022 (aged 87) Tunisia
- Party: Independent

Mohammed Ali Salim (1935 – 28 January 2022) was a Libyan politician who was, for one day, the Acting Chairman of the General National Congress of Libya, a role he was given by virtue of being the oldest member of Libya's first democratically elected legislature, until Mohamed Yousef el-Magariaf was appointed permanent chair.

Salim died in Tunisia on 28 January 2022, at the age of 87.

Political offices
Preceded by Mustafa Abdul Jalil	Interim President of Libya de facto 2012	Succeeded by Mohammed Magariaf
