= Imbarek Shamekh =

Libyan politician and bureaucrat

Imbarek Shamekh امبارك عبدالله الشامخ

Secretary-General of General People's Congress of Libya
- In office 5 March 2009 – 26 January 2010
- Prime Minister: Baghdadi Mahmudi
- Leader: Muammar Gaddafi
- Preceded by: Miftah Muhammed K'eba
- Succeeded by: Mohamed Abu al-Qasim al-Zwai

Deputy Prime Minister of Libya
- In office 2 March 2008 – 5 March 2009
- Prime Minister: Baghdadi Mahmudi
- Leader: Muammar Gaddafi

Prime Minister of Libya Head of Government of Libya
- In office 1 March 2000 – 14 June 2003
- Leader: Muammar Gaddafi
- Preceded by: Muhammad Ahmad al-Mangoush
- Succeeded by: Shukri Ghanem

Personal details
- Born: 15 May 1952 (age 74) Benghazi, Libya
- Education: University of Central Florida

Imbarek Shamekh (Arabic: امبارك عبدالله الشامخ) (sometimes Mubarak Abdallah al-Shamikh or Embarek Shamekh) (born 15 May 1952) is a Libyan politician and bureaucrat. He served as the Secretary-General of General People's Congress of Libya (head of state) from 2009 to 2010. He previously served as Deputy Prime Minister from 2008 to 2009, and Prime Minister from 2000 to 2003.

== Early life and education ==
Shamekh was born on 15 May 1952 in Benghazi, Libya. He moved to the United States in the early 1970s to pursue his scholarship. Shamekh attended college at the University of Central Florida in Orlando, Florida, where he graduated in 1981 with a degree in engineering.

== Career ==
From February 1982 to March 1984, Shamekh was the Minister of Transportation for Benghazi. From March 1984 until October 1990, he served as Minister of Transportation. He was Governor of Sirte province from October 1990 to December 1992, and the Minister of Housing and Utilities from December 1992 to March 2000.

In March 2000, Muammar Gaddafi made sweeping changes to Libya's cabinet structure. Twelve ministers, the prime minister and foreign minister were replaced. From then until June 2003, Shamekh was prime minister (also known as General Secretary of the General People's Committee).

Shamekh was president of the Higher Planning Council of Libya from June 2003 until September 2004. From September 2004 to January 2005 he served as the governor of Benghazi. He served as deputy prime minister March 2008 to March 2009, when he resigned his post to become secretary-general of General People's Congress of Libya.

In February 2011, during the Libyan Civil War, he defected to Egypt.

In a leaked phone call between Muammar Gaddafi and Tayeb El Safi from March 2011, Gaddafi expressed his shock at Shamekh's defection.

Political offices
Preceded by Miftah Muhammed K'eba	Secretary General of General People's Congress of Libya; 2009 – 2010	Succeeded by Mohamed Abu al-Qasim al-Zwai
Preceded by Muhammad Ahmad al-Mangoush	Prime Minister of Libya; 2000 – 2003	Succeeded by Shukri Ghanem
