= Miguel d'Escoto Brockmann =

President of the 63rd UN General Assembly

The Reverend Miguel d'Escoto Brockmann M.M.
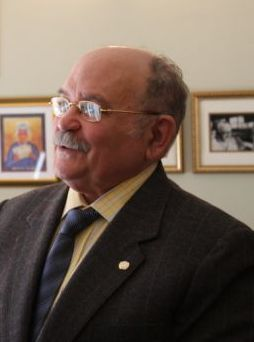
- Brockmann in 2010

President of the United Nations General Assembly
- In office September 16, 2008 – September 2009
- Preceded by: Srgjan Asan Kerim
- Succeeded by: Ali Abdussalam Treki

Ambassador of Libyan Arab Jamahiriya to the United Nations
- In office 29 March 2011 – 20 October 2011
- Preceded by: Abdel Rahman Shalgham
- Succeeded by: Post Abolished

Foreign Minister of Nicaragua
- In office 19 July 1979 – 25 April 1990
- Preceded by: Harry Bodán Shields
- Succeeded by: Enrique Dreyfus

Personal details
- Born: February 5, 1933 Los Angeles, California, United States
- Died: June 8, 2017 (aged 84) Managua, Nicaragua

Miguel d'Escoto Brockmann M.M. (February 5, 1933 – June 8, 2017) was an American-born Nicaraguan diplomat, politician and Catholic priest of the Maryknoll Missionary Society. As the President of the United Nations General Assembly from September 2008 to September 2009, he presided over the 63rd Session of the United Nations General Assembly. He was also nominated as Libyan Representative to the UN in March 2011. He died on 8 June 2017, having suffered a stroke several months earlier.

== Early life ==
D'Escoto was born in Los Angeles, California. on February 5, 1933. His father was Miguel Escoto Muñoz, a Nicaraguan diplomat. His mother was Margarita Brockmann Meléndez. Through his father Miguel d’Escoto Brockmann was descended from Nazario Escoto, acting president of Nicaragua in 1855. He was then raised in Nicaragua but was sent back to the United States to begin his high school studies in 1947.

== Priesthood ==
D'Escoto felt called to serve as priest and entered the seminary of the Maryknoll Missionary Society in 1953. He was ordained a priest of the Society in 1961 before becoming engaged in politics. He earned a Master of Science degree from the Columbia University Graduate School of Journalism the following year, and was a key figure in the founding of the Maryknoll publishing house, Orbis Books, in 1970. He served as an official of the World Council of Churches. As an adherent of liberation theology, he secretly joined the Sandinistas. D'Escoto formed the Nicaraguan Foundation for Integral Community Development (FUNDECI) in January 1973 to promote a nongovernmental response to the displacement of thousands in the December 1972 Managua earthquake. He continued on as President of FUNDECI, which operates in several departments in Nicaragua until his death in 2017.

On August 5, 2014, the Vatican announced that Pope Francis had reinstated D'Escoto as a priest after he had been suspended for thirty years for taking up office in Nicaragua's left-wing Sandinista government. D'Escoto had been banned from celebrating Mass by Pope John Paul II for defying a church ban on priests holding political office. D'Escoto served as Nicaragua's foreign minister from 1979 to 1990. He welcomed the news and said his punishment had been unfair. D'Escoto, 81, had written to Pope Francis asking to be allowed to celebrate Mass before he died.

== Nicaraguan Revolution ==
D'Escoto first publicly expressed support for the FSLN as one of Los Doce, in October 1977, and was appointed foreign minister after the Sandinista triumph in 1979. He served as foreign minister in Daniel Ortega's FSLN government from 1979 to 1990. During a visit to Central America, Pope John Paul II publicly admonished him for his political activity.

In 1985, the pope denounced him and two other priests, the brothers Ernesto and Fernando Cardenal. All three served in the Nicaraguan government but did not resign from office and so in violation of canon law. D'Escoto was suspended by the Holy See in 1985, together with the two other priests. The suspension stayed in place until August 2014, when Pope Francis lifted it.

Early in the war, the Reagan administration perceived D'Escoto as a relative moderate who might break with the regime. As foreign minister, D'Escoto received the Lenin Peace Prize in 1985 and 1986 and the Thomas Merton Award in 1987. In 1999, then Archbishop of Managua, Cardinal Miguel Obando y Bravo, criticized the priests who became involved with the Sandinistas and abandoned their priestly ministry for politics. He said the priests never denounced the injustices that took place at the time.

== Political activity ==
On March 3, 1986, D'Escoto gave a speech on Nicaraguan television publicly insulting and condemning Cardinal Obando for not siding with the Sandinista regime against the Contras: "There is no word uttered by human mouth, no adjective that we could use to truly describe the horror produced by this brother of ours."

After the Sandinistas lost the 1990 Nicaraguan general election, D'Escoto led the Communal Movement but resigned that post in December 1991 after his support within the organization waned. He supported Daniel Ortega against the Sandinista Renovation Movement dissidents.

== United Nations ==
=== President of the General Assembly ===
The Latin American and Caribbean Group selected him as their candidate to become the president of the UN General Assembly. On June 4, 2008, he was elected by acclamation to preside over 63rd Session of the United Nations General Assembly from September 2008 to September 2009.

Shortly after his election, D'Escoto stated during a press conference:

They elected a priest. And I hope no one is offended if I say that love is what is most needed in this world. And that selfishness is what has gotten us into the terrible quagmire in which the world is sinking, almost irreversibly, unless something big happens. This may sound like a sermon. Well, OK.

D'Escoto stated that addressing rising energy and food prices around the world would be priorities. His other priorities would include hunger, poverty, climate change, terrorism, human rights, disarmament, nuclear control, cultural diversity, the rights of women and children and the protection of biodiversity. He designated 16 senior advisers: Brother David Andrews, C.S.C. (USA), Maude Barlow (Canada), Mohammed Bedjaoui (Algeria), Leonardo Boff (Brazil), Kevin M. Cahill (USA), François Houtart (Belgium), Noam Chomsky (USA), Ramsey Clark (USA), Richard Falk (USA), Michael Kennedy (USA), Eleonora Kennedy (USA), Olivier De Schutter (Belgium), Joseph Stiglitz (USA), Sir John E. Sulston (UK), Francisco Lacayo Parajón (Nicaragua) and Howard Zinn (USA).

In June 2010, D'Escoto was elected by acclamation to the Council Advisory Committee to the United Nations Human Rights Council.

==== Reform of the United Nations ====
D'Escoto criticised the veto power wielded by the permanent members of the United Nations Security Council. Therein he said "I hope my presidency will address what has become a universal clamour all over the world for the democratisation of the United Nations. I promise to give full support to the working group on the revitalisation of the General Assembly."

==== Relations with the United States ====
Described by Reuters as "a fierce critic of the foreign relations of the United States (he referred to Ronald Reagan in 2004 as "the butcher of my people"): "Because of Reagan and his spiritual heir George W. Bush, the world today is far less safe and secure than it has ever been."

Following his election to the presidency of the United Nations General Assembly, he offered a statement interpreted as renewed criticism aimed at the United States: "The behavior of some member states has caused the United Nations to lose credibility as an organisation capable of putting an end to war and eradicating extreme poverty from our planet." He denounced what he called "acts of aggression, such as those occurring in Iraq and Afghanistan." However, he expressed his "love" for "the United States as a country" and added: "I do not want to turn this General Assembly presidency into a place to take it out on the United States." Reacting to those comments, U.S. Ambassador to the United Nations Zalmay Khalilzad responded: "We have been assured that a page has been turned and that he understands his new responsibilities.... We will wait and see." Richard Grenell, spokesman for the U.S. Mission to the United Nations, added: "The president of the General Assembly is supposed to be a uniter. We have made it clear that these crazy comments are not acceptable, and we hope he refrains from this talk and gets to work on General Assembly business." However, Mark Kornblau, spokesman for the United States Mission to the United Nations, said: "It's hard to make sense of Mr. D'Escoto's increasingly bizarre statements."

=== Relations with Israel and Iran ===
On September 17, 2008, Israel's Ambassador to the U.N Gabriela Shalev called D'Escoto an "Israel-hater" because D'Escoto "hugged" Iranian President Mahmoud Ahmadinejad after Ahmedinedjad's strongly anti-Israel and anti-Zionist September 2008 speech to the UN General Assembly. D'Escoto's spokesman responded by saying: "He cannot respond to each and every speech made by the leaders of these states." The Israeli ambassador also criticised D'Escoto for attending a dinner marking the end of the Islamic fasting month of Ramadan with a number of Middle Eastern leaders, including Ahmadinejad. D'Escoto's spokesman responded by saying: "[D'Escoto] will join the dinner because he believes in dialogue, an issue which he had highlighted, and thinks that he should deal with all member states."

=== Libyan ambassador ===
On March 29, 2011, during the 2011 Libyan civil war, Libyan Foreign Minister Moussa Koussa wrote to United Nations Secretary-General Ban Ki-moon, nominating d'Escoto as Libya’s new ambassador to the UN. The letter stated that he was nominated, as Ali Treki, also a former General Assembly president who was Libya's first choice, was denied a visa to enter the United States under United Nations Security Council Resolution 1973. US ambassador Susan Rice claimed that he did not possess the proper diplomatic visa to represent Libya and suggested Mussa Kussa's recommendation might be void because of his resignation on March 30 from the Libyan government.

== Death ==
On June 8, 2017, Brockmann died at the age of 84 after suffering a stroke several months earlier. He was buried in the Cementerio General in Managua.
