= Lamia Abusedra =

Libyan engineer, revolutionary and political figure (b. 1974)

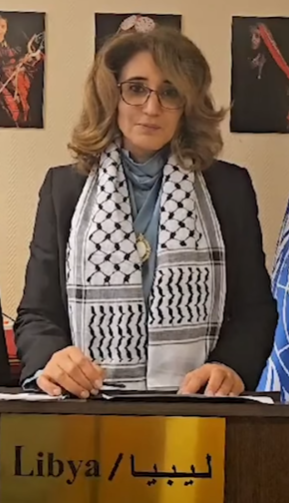
- In a UNCHR video in 2023

Libyan Ambassador to the United Nations
- Incumbent
- Assumed office 3 May 2022
- President: Mohamed al-Menfi
- Prime Minister: Fathi Bashagha; Osama Hammad; Abdul Hamid Dbeibeh
- Preceded by: Taher Al-Sunni

Minister of State for Institution Reform
- In office June 2017 – June 2020

Head of International Relations Administration of the National Transitional Council (NTC) Executive Office of Cultural Relations and Civil Society (EOCCS)

Personal details
- Born: 26 January 1974 (age 52) Libya
- Education: University of Garyounis (BSc, MSc); University of Exeter (PhD)

Lamia Fathi Abusedra (26 January 1974) is a Libyan engineer, revolutionary, political advisor and diplomat.

During the 2011 Libyan Civil War, Abudesdra created a database of people impacted by the war, founded the NGO Forum For a Democratic Libya and the Libyan Coalition of NGOs.

Abusedra was Head of International Relations Administration in the National Transitional Council’s Executive Office of Cultural Relations and Civil Society (EOCCS) after the war, then advised the Minister of State for Institution Reform.

From May 2022, Abusedra has served as the Permanent Representative of Libya to the United Nations at Geneva.

== Early life and education ==
Abusedra was born on 26 January 1974 in Libya.

Abusedra achieved her Bachelor of Science and Master of Science degrees at the University of Garyounis in Benghazi. After achieving her PhD at the University of Exeter in the United Kingdom, Abusedra worked as an associate researcher at Exeter's School of Engineering, Computer Science and Mathematics from 2007 to 2009.

== Career in Libya ==
Abusedra returned to Libya and her alma mater the University of Garyounis in 2010, where she taught at the Department of Electrical and Electronic Engineering.

=== Libyan Civil War and Transitional Council ===
During the 2011 Libyan Civil War, Abusedra created "a database of people who disappeared, were injured, in hospitals, deprived of homes, or affected by the military actions in any other way." She was a member of the Humanitarian Relief Coordination platform in Benghazi. She also founded the NGO Forum For a Democratic Libya, based in Benghazi, Cyrenaica, and the Libyan Coalition of NGOs in 2011. She said in 2012 that "NGOs in Libya are here to stay. Civil Society will not be repressed like by the previous regime. There is no going back."

Abusedra became the Head of International Relations Administration under the new de facto government of Libya, serving with the National Transitional Council’s (NTC) Executive Office of Cultural Relations and Civil Society (EOCCS). Alongside other "Arab Spring" activists, Abusedra was invited to Warsaw, Poland, to meet with the Polish Deputy Foreign Ministers Krzysztof Stanowski and Jerzy Pomianowski and the State Electoral Commission to learn from the free ballots and parliamentary elections.

From March 2013 to December 2014, Abusedra served as Deputy Minister of Information of Libya. During this appointment, the Libyan Content Development Fund (LCDF) was launched to support development of the free Libyan media sector, in partnership with German media development organisation Deutsche Welle and the European Union (EU).

In August 2016, Abusedra participated in the Beyond Borders Scotland's "Fellowship on Peacebuilding and Women’s Meaningful Participation in Peacebuilding Processes." From June 2017 to June 2020, Abusedra served as an advisor to the Minister of State for Institution Reform. She was then briefly Foreign Minister, but was replaced by Najla Mangoush in March 2021.

=== Ambassador to the UN ===
On 3 May 2022, Abusedra became Ambassador Extraordinary and Plenipotentiary as the new Permanent Representative of Libya to the United Nations (UN) at Geneva. She presented her credentials to Director-General of the United Nations Office at Geneva, Tatiana Valovaya. In this role, Abusedra has supported and cooperated with the UN's independent fact-finding mission, which had a mandate to investigate human rights, in Libya. The mission found "reports of torture, extrajudicial killings, enforced disappearances and sexual and gender-based violence" and "political division, insecurity, the proliferation of weapons and the increasing phenomenon of irregular migration and external intervention." A national human rights plan has been implemented in Libya to address the issues and violations of international human rights law.

Abusedra has also presented reports to the Working Group of Experts on People of African Descent and has participated in panels delivered for young women in diplomacy to mark International Women’s Day. In February 2025, Abusedra opened the event "Investing in Stability: Private Sector & Trade Reform for Sustainable Peace in Libya" at the World Trade Organization (WTO).
