= Ministry of Justice (Libya) =

The Ministry of Justice of Libya promotes the rule of law and justice in Libya and aims to produce an effective judiciary and prison system. The ministry is responsible for drafting laws and, in 2013, announced plans to review legislation so that it may conform to sharia law.

== List of ministers (Post-independence in 1951) ==
- Abdur Rahman al-Galhoud (1954-1956)
- Ali Sahli (1956)
- Mohieddin Fikini (1956-1957)
- Abd al-Hamid Daibani (1960)
- Wahbi al-Bouri (1961-1962)
- Omar Mahmud al-Muntasir (1962-1964)
- Abdul Hamid al-Bakkoush (1964-1968)
- Rajab al Majri (1969)
- Muhammed Qadi (1969-1970)
- Muhammed 'Ali Jadi (1972-1980)
- Muhammed Abu al-Qasim al-Zuwayy (1981-1984) [referred to as the Secretary of Justice]
- Miftah Muhammed K'eba (1985-1986) [referred to as the Secretary of Justice]
- 'Izz al-Din al-Hinshari (1990) [referred to as the Secretary of Justice]
- Ibrahim Muhammed Bakkar (1991-1994) [referred to as the Secretary of Justice]
- Mustafa Moustafa Al-Qulaib (1994)
- Mahmud al-Hijazi (1994-1998) [referred to as Secretary of Justice and Public Security]
- Muhammed Abu al-Qasim al-Zuwayy (1999-2000) [referred to as Secretary of Justice and Public Security]
- Abd al-Rahman al-Abbar (2001) [referred to as Secretary of General People's Committee for Justice and Public Security]
- Mohamed Ali Al-Masirati (2001-2003) [referred to as Secretary of General People's Committee for Justice and Public Security]
- Umar Abu Bakr (2004-2006) [referred to as the Secretary of Justice]
- Mustafa Abdul Jalil (2007-2011)
- Ali Ashour (2011-2012) [Statutory law emphasized that the Secretary of Justice refers to the Minister of Justice]
- Salah Bashir Margani (2012-2014)
- Juma Abdullah Drissi (2016–2021)
- Halima al-Bousefi (2021–present)

*A new Ministry of Justice would not be created until 1989.

== See also ==
- Justice ministry
- Politics of Libya
