= Abdul Razzaq as-Sawsa =

Libyan politician (1933–2016)

Secretary-General of the General People's Congress
- In office 7 October 1990 – 18 November 1992
- Leader: Muammar Gaddafi
- Preceded by: Mifta al-Usta Umar
- Succeeded by: Muhammad az-Zanati

Personal details
- Born: 3 February 1933 Italian Libya
- Died: 10 March 2016 (aged 83)

Abdul Razzaq as-Sawsa (Arabic: عبد الرزاق الصوصاع) (3 February 1933 – 10 March 2016) was the General Secretary of Libya's General People's Congress, and as such at least theoretically the head of state of Libya from 7 October 1990 to 18 November 1992. However, it was Muammar Gaddafi who continued to exercise ultimate authority in Libya, as "Leader and Guide of the Revolution".
