= Miftah Muhammed K'eba =

Libyan politician

Miftah Muhammed Keibah مفتاح محمد كعيبة

Secretary General of the General People's Congress of Libya
- In office 3 March 2008 – 5 March 2009
- Prime Minister: Baghdadi Mahmudi
- Leader: Muammar Gaddafi
- Preceded by: Muhammad az-Zanati
- Succeeded by: Imbarek Shamekh

Personal details
- Born: July 16, 1947 (age 78) Libya

Miftah Muhammed Keibah or Miftah Muhammad kaibah (Arabic: مفتاح محمد كعيبة; born July 16, 1947) is a Libyan politician who was the Secretary-General of the General People's Congress of Libya from 3 March 2008 to 5 March 2009 and as such head of state, at least theoretically. Though Muammar Gaddafi continued to exercise ultimate authority in Libya. K'eba also was the Secretary of Justice during the 1980s.
