= Brazil–Libya relations =

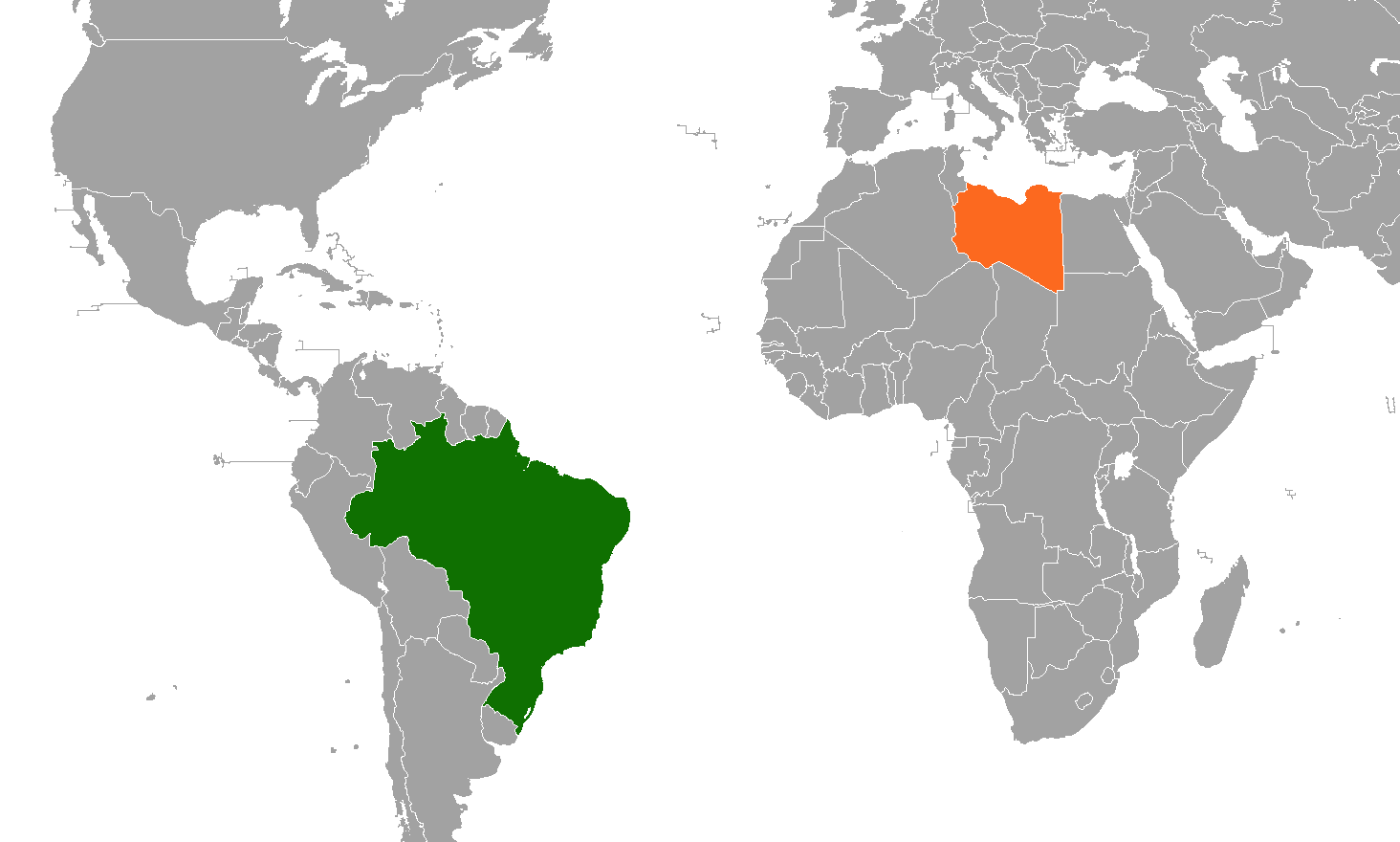

- Brazil: Libya

Brazil–Libya relations are the bilateral relations between Brazil and Libya. The two countries are members of the Group of 77 and the United Nations.

== History ==
Brazil opened its embassy in Tripoli in 1974. Throughout the 1970s, the relationship focused on economic and commercial cooperation. With Libya's growing international isolation in the 1980s and 1990s, bilateral relations lost momentum. Rapprochement began in the 2000s, following the lifting of United Nations sanctions. In 1992, United Nations Security Council came into force in Brazil, and Brazil downgraded its representation in Tripoli to a chargé d’affaires. In 2000, however, Brazil reappointed an ambassador to Libya. In 2001, General Mustafa al-Kharubi, a special envoy of Colonel Muammar Gaddafi, visited Brazil. Than same year, Senator Ney Suassuna visited Libya and delivered a letter from President Fernando Henrique Cardoso to Gaddafi.

In 2002, Libya's Minister of Economy, Shukri Ghanem, visited Brazil to discuss strengthening bilateral economic and trade relations. In 2003, Brazilian president Luiz Inácio Lula da Silva visited Libya and met with Gaddafi and Prime Minister Shukri Ghanem to expand cooperation across several areas. Lula returned to Libya in 2009 to attend the XIII Summit of the African Union.

== After the Libyan Civil War ==
Brazil closed its embassy in Tripoli due to the First Libyan civil war, and reopened it in 2012. In 2014, due to the Second Libyan civil war, Brazil closed its embassy again and temporarily relocated operations to Tunis. Brazil voted in favor of the accreditation of the National Transitional Council as the representative of Libya for the 66th ordinary session of the UN General Assembly, recognizing that entity as the legitimate representative of the Libyan people.

== Trade ==
The commercial exchange between Brazil and Libya totaled US$ 448.1 million in 2019, with a surplus of US$ 114.7 million for Brazil.

== Resident diplomatic missions ==
- Libya has an embassy in Brasília.
- Brazil is accredited to Libya through its embassy in Tunis.
