= Mustafa Abdul Jalil =

Interim leader of Libya from 2011 to 2012

- مصطفى عبد الجليل
- Abdul Jalil in 2011

Chairman of the National Transitional Council
- In office 5 March 2011 – 8 August 2012
- Prime Minister: Mahmoud Jibril; Ali Tarhouni (a.i.); Abdurrahim El-Keib
- Vice President: Abdul Hafiz Ghoga; Mustafa Honi
- Preceded by: Muammar Gaddafi (as Brotherly Leader and Guide of the Revolution) (Note: Mohamed Abu al-Qasim al-Zwai, the Secretary General of General People's Congress as de jure head of state of the Great Socialist People's Libyan Arab Jamahiriya.)
- Succeeded by: Mohammed Ali Salim (Note: Acting President of the General National Congress as head of state of the State of Libya.)

Secretary of the Libyan General Committee for Justice
- In office 10 January 2007 – 21 February 2011
- Brotherly Leader: Muammar Gaddafi
- Prime Minister: Baghdadi Mahmudi
- Preceded by: Ali Omar al-Hasnawi
- Succeeded by: Muhammad Ahmed al-Qamoudi (Note: (as Secretary of the Libyan General Committee for Justice); Ali Ashour as Minister of Justice)

Personal details
- Born: 6 November 1952 (age 74) Beida, Kingdom of Libya
- Party: Independent
- Education: University of Libya

Mustafa Abdul Jalil (Arabic: مصطفى عبد الجليل; also transcribed Abdul-Jelil, Abd-al-Jalil, Abdel-Jalil, Abdeljalil or Abdu Al Jeleil; born 6 November 1952) is a Libyan politician who was the Chairman of the National Transitional Council from 5 March 2011 until its dissolution on 8 August 2012. This position meant he was de facto head of state during a transitional period after the fall of Muammar Gaddafi's government in the Libyan Civil War, and until the handover of power to the General National Congress.

Before the war, Abdul Jalil served as Muammar Gaddafi's Minister of Justice (officially, the Secretary of the General People's Committee of Justice). He was noted in some news media for his stance against various human rights violations in Libya, although Diana West accused him of intransigence during the Bulgarian nurses affair.

== Career ==
After graduating from the department of Shari'a and Law in the Arabic Language and Islamic Studies faculty of University of Libya in 1975, Abdul Jalil was initially "assistant to the Secretary of the Public Prosecutor" in Beida, before being appointed a judge in 1978.

Abdul Jalil was a judge "known for ruling consistently against the regime," before becoming justice minister in 2007. In January 2010 he attempted to resign on national television over the government's failure to release political prisoners. His resignation was rejected. He resigned on 21 February 2011 after being sent to Benghazi to negotiate the release of hostages taken by rebels, being the first senior official to do so.

In classified US diplomatic cables leaked by the website WikiLeaks, he is described as open and cooperative. Following his resignation from Gaddafi's government in protest at its actions during the Libyan Civil War, a bounty of 500,000 dinars, roughly 400,000 USD, was announced for his capture.

== Stances noted in the media ==
=== Pre-2011 protests ===
In August 2010, a representative of Human Rights Watch praised the fact that Abdul Jalil had "reportedly taken a strong stance against arbitrary arrests and prolonged detention without trial", commenting that:

The Minister of Justice has taken a very good stance on this group of prisoners. He’s publicly criticized the security agencies for continuing to detain prisoners, despite the fact that they have been acquitted by the courts. And, the problem really is that the Internal Security Agency and the Ministry of Interior have been ignoring court orders.

In a paper published in November 2010, Amnesty International stated similarly, that:

At least 200 others remain detained after serving their sentences or being acquitted by courts. Justice Minister Mostafa Abdeljalil has publicly called for the release of these prisoners, but the Internal Security Agency, which holds them, refuses to comply... Justice Minister Abdeljalil has said that he is unable to order an investigation into abuses by Internal Security Agency Officers because they have immunity. Only the Interior Ministry can waive immunity, but it has consistently refused to do so, he said.

Human Rights Watch made the same observations in its submission to the 2010 Universal Periodic Review (UPR) of the United Nations Human Rights Council.

However, L'Express questioned his track record, noting that before being named a minister of justice of Libya in 2007, he was the president of the Libyan Court of Appeal. The paper opined that Abdul Jalil was responsible for the "intransigence" of the court in confirming the death sentences in the "Bulgarian nurses" HIV trial under Gaddafi.

=== 2011 protests and civil war ===
During the Libyan Civil War he was dispatched by Gaddafi's son to Benghazi to allegedly "negotiate the release of hostages taken by Islamists". On 21 February, the privately owned Quryna newspaper reported that he had resigned over "the excessive use of violence against anti-government protesters". On 22 February, he claimed in an interview with Swedish newspaper Expressen that he had proof Gaddafi had personally ordered the 1988 Lockerbie bombing. To date, he has not revealed this proof.

On 24 February, the BBC reported that, at a meeting of opposition politicians, former military officers and tribal leaders the eastern city of Beida, Abdul Jalil said there would be no talks with the Libyan leader and called for him to step down immediately.

On 5 March, Reuters reported that Abdul Jalil claimed to have "official contacts with European and Arab (countries)" and that "some countries will announce their recognition" of the National Transitional Council "soon".

On 9 March, Abdul Jalil called for the imposition of a no-fly zone over Libya.

As the Battle of Tripoli tilted in favor of forces answering to the NTC, Abdul Jalil said on 24 August that democratic elections would be held in eight months. He also said that Gaddafi and his sons, once captured, would be tried in Libya prior to being sent to The Hague for trial at the International Criminal Court.

== Efforts to form an interim government ==
On 24 February 2011, opposition politicians, former military officers, tribal leaders, academics and businessmen held a meeting in the eastern city of Beida. The meeting was chaired by Abdul Jalil, who quit the government a few days before. The delegates stressed the importance of the national unity of Libya and stated that Tripoli is the capital city. They discussed proposals for interim administration with many delegates asking for UN intervention in Libya. The podium at the meeting displayed the pre-Gaddafi era flag of the Kingdom of Libya (1951–1969).

On 25 February 2011, Al Jazeera reported that talks were taking place between "personalities from eastern and western Libya" to form an interim government for the post-Gaddafi era. On 26 February, it was reported that Abdul Jalil was leading the process of forming an interim government, to be based in Benghazi. Abdul Jalil stated that "Gaddafi alone bore responsibility for the crimes that have occurred" in Libya, he also insisted on the unity of Libya and that Tripoli is the capital. The efforts to form an alternative government have been supported by the Libyan ambassador in the United States, Ali Suleiman Aujali. The Libyan deputy ambassador to the United Nations, Ibrahim Dabbashi, has stated that he supported a new alternative government "in principle".

The members of the new interim government were to be announced on 27 February 2011 at a press conference in the city of Benghazi. Some of the portfolios were to be left vacant for representatives for areas that were still controlled by the Gaddafi-led government. The proposed interim government aims to remain in power for three months after which elections will be held. The new interim government is to include both civilians and persons from the military.

Abdul Jalil was stated to be the head of the National Transitional Council in the council's founding statement of 5 March 2011.

== Assassination of Abdul Fatah Younis ==
According to WikiLeaks, an email from Sidney Blumenthal to Hillary Clinton states that

in July and August 2011 NTC security officers discovered evidence that Younis was in secret contact with Saif al Islam Qaddafi. In response to this report a sensitive source stated that Jalil ordered NTC security officers to assassinate Younis while en route to a meeting at NTC headquarters. Jalil then reported that Younis had been killed by Islamist dissidents among his troops.

The same email to Clinton also purportedly states that

Zeidan's efforts are complicated by the ongoing legal problems of former National Transitional Council (NTC) leader Mustafa Abdul-Jalil, who will be questioned by both military and civilian prosecutors regarding his role in the July 2011 assassination of General Abdel-Fattah Younis, Gadhafi's former interior minister and one of the first major defectors from the old regime. Jalil and 10 other NTC officials have been charged with Younis' death, though none have been arrested

In an October 2020 TV interview, Jalil denied any involvement in Younis' assassination, but alleged Younis' defection was a ruse to preserve the "deep state" of the Gaddafi regime.

== See also ==
- General People's Committee of Libya

== Notes ==
Political offices
Preceded by Muammar Gaddafi as Leader and Guide of the Revolution of Libya	Chairman of the National Transitional Council of Libya; 2011–2012	Succeeded by Mohammed Ali Salim as Acting President of the General National Congress
Preceded by Mohamed Abu al-Qasim al-Zwai as Secretary General of General People's Congress of Libya	Chairman of the National Transitional Council of Libya; 2011–2012	Succeeded by Mohammed Ali Salim as Acting President of the General National Congress
