= Ibrahim Dabbashi =

Libyan diplomat

Ibrahim Dabbashi ابراهيم الدباشي

Permanent Representative of Libya to the United Nations
- In office 23 July 2013 – August 2016
- Preceded by: Abdel Rahman Shalgham
- Succeeded by: Elmahdi S. Elmajerbi (as chargé d’affaires)

Personal details
- Born: Ibrahim Omar Dabbashi; 25 February 1950 (age 76) Sabratha, Libya
- Party: Independent
- Education: University of Tripoli
- Website: Dabbashi.com

Ibrahim Omar Dabbashi (Arabic: إبراهيم عمر الدباشي, born 25 February 1950) is a Libyan diplomat who formerly served as the Libyan Permanent Representative to the United Nations in New York. With the advent of the Libyan Civil War, Dabbashi led the country's UN mission in opposing the continued rule of Muammar Gaddafi.

Dabbashi was born in Sabratha, Libya. He obtained a Bachelor of Arts degree from Al Fateh University in 1974 and joined the Libyan Ministry of Foreign Affairs in 1975.

In January 2009, Dabbashi became the deputy Permanent Representative of Libya to the United Nations in New York. In March 2009, he served a term as the President of the United Nations Security Council.

In February 2011, Dabbashi announced that he and the other members of Libya's UN mission were calling on Gaddafi to resign and that crimes against humanity and war crimes had been committed in Libya by the regime.

In November 2011, after the fall of Gaddafi's government, it was reported that Dabbashi would be appointed as Libya's foreign minister by the National Transitional Council, but the reports proved incorrect when Ashour Bin Khayal was appointed to the position.

== Education ==
Dabbashi earned a BA in French Language and Literature from the University of Alfateh in 1974 and a diploma in Refugee Law from the International Institute of Humanitarian Law in 2005.

== Languages ==
Dabbashi is fluent in Arabic, French, and English.

== Work experience ==
- Permanent Representative Of Libya To the United Nations, New York, Jul 2013 – August 2016
- Deputy Permanent Representative Of Libya To the United Nations, New York City from Jan 2009 - Jul 2013
- Deputy Permanent Representative of Libya at the UN Security Council, Jan 2008 – Dec 2009
- President of the UN Security Council, March 2009
- Ambassador at the Libyan Mission To the United Nations, New York, Sep 2007 –
- Deputy Director and Acting Director Department of International Organizations Jan 2004 – Sep 2007
- Head of Division Department of International Organizations In charge of Political and Disarmament and International Security Issues, Jul 2002 – Jan 2004
- Minister Plenipotentiary Libyan Embassy in Bonn/Berlin, Germany Jul 1998 – Jun 2002
- Acting Director Department of International Organizations Aug 1997 – Jan 1998
- Head of Division Department of International Organizations Nov 1996 – Jul 1998
- Political Advisor to the Secretariat of the General People's Congress, Jun 1995 – Oct 1996
- Head of Eastern European Division Secretariat for Foreign Affairs, Oct 1992 – Apr 1995
- Counselor Libyan Embassy, Belgrade, Yugoslavia, Jul 1988 – Jul 1992
- Head of Non-aligned Division Secretariat for Foreign Affairs, July 1985 – Jun 1988
- Rapporteur of the Fourth Committee 36th Session of the United Nations General Assembly, 1981
- Second, then First Secretary Libyan Mission to the United Nations New York, Nov 1980 – Apr 1985
- Assistant to Head of the Division Of the Organisation of African Unity Secretariat for Foreign Affairs, Mar – Oct 1980
- Head of Central Africa Desk Department of Africa
- Secretariat for Foreign Affairs, Feb 1978 – Mar 1980
- Third Secretary Libyan Embassy, Chad Aug 1975 – Jan 1978
- Attache's Assistant to the Head of the Political Division Department of Africa Ministry of Foreign Affairs Jan/Aug 1975
- Joined Ministry of Foreign Affairs Jan 1975

== Participation in international and regional forums ==
United Nations and Related Meetings

- Review Conference of the Nuclear Non-Proliferation Treaty, New York, 2010
- The 59th, 60th, 61st, 62nd, 63rd and 64th Ordinary Sessions of the United Nations General Assembly, from 2004 to 2010
- The 5th Session of the Human Rights Council, Geneva, June 2007
- Workshop on the Program of Action on the illicit trade in Small Arms and Light Weapons, in all its aspects, Tunisia, June 2004
- Regional Workshop on Military and Humanitarian Issues related to the Ottawa Treaty on Antipersonnel mines, Amman, Jordan, 2004
- The 5th and 6th Sessions of the Intergovernmental Group of Experts of the States Parties to the CCW, Geneva, 2003
- Resumed 6th Session of the conference of the Parties to the United Nations Framework Convention on Climate Change, Bonn, Germany, 2001
- Convention to Combat Desertification, Bonn, Germany, 2000
- The 5th Session of the Conference of the Parties to the United Nations Framework Convention on Climate Change, Bonn, Germany, 1999
- First Periodical Meeting on International Humanitarian Law, Geneva, 1998
- All Special Session and Emergency Special Sessions of the United Nations General Assembly, held between December 1980 and 1985
- The 34th, 35th, 36th, 37th, 38th, 39th, Ordinary Sessions of the United Nations General Assembly, from 1979 to 1984
- The 9th Special Session of the United Nations General Assembly on Namibia, April 25 – May 3, 1978

Organisation of African Unity/ African Union Meetings

- The 16th and 17th Summit Conferences of the Organisation of African Unity, Khartoum and Monrovia, 1978 & 1979
- The 30th, 31st, 32nd and 33rd Ordinary Session of the Council of Ministers of the Organisation of African Unity, held successively in Khartoum, 1978, Nairobi, 1979, Monrovia, 1979 and Addis Ababa, 1980 Non-Aligned Movement Meetings
- The 14th Summit Conference of the NAM, Havana, Cuba, September 2006
- Asian-African Summit, Jakarta, Indonesia, April 2005
- The 15th Ministerial Conference of the NAM, Durban, South Africa, 2004
- The 13th Summit Conference of the NAM, Kuala Lumpur, Malaysia, 2003
- The 12th Ministerial Conference of the NAM, New Delhi, India, 1997
- The 11th Ministerial Conference of the NAM, Cairo, Egypt, 1994
- The 9th Summit Conference of the NAM, Belgrade, Yugoslavia, 1989
- Ministerial Meeting of the Coordinating Bureau of the NAM, Harare, Zimbabwe, May 1989
- Meeting of the Ministerial Conference of the Non-aligned Countries on the Role and Methodology of the movement, Nicosia, Cyprus, 1989
- Ministerial Conference of the NAM, Nicosia, Cyprus, 1988
- Special Ministerial Conference of the NAM on South-South Cooperation, PiongYang, Democratic People's Republic of Korea, 1987
- The 2nd Ministerial Conference of Non-aligned Mediterranean Countries, Brioni, Yugoslavia 1987
- The 8th Summit Conference of the NAM, Harare, Zimbabwe, 1986
- Ministerial Conference of the Coordinating Bureau, New Delhi, India, 1986
- Ministerial Conference of the NAM, Luanda, Angola, 1985
- Ministerial Conference of the Coordination Bureau, Havana, Cuba, 1982 League of Arab States Meetings
- The 17th Ordinary Arab Summit, Algiers, Algeria, March 2005 Parliamentary Meetings
- The 4th Conference of the Parliamentary Union of the Members of the OIC, Dakar, Senegal, 2004
- Afro-Arab Parliamentary conference, Cotonou, Benin, 1998
- Special Conference of the Arab Parliamentary Union on Terrorism, Luxor, Egypt, 1998
- The 33rd Session on the African Parliamentary Union, Tripoli, Libya, 1996
- The 6th and the 7th Conferences of the Arab Parliamentary Union, Rabat, Morocco, 1995, and Damascus, Syria 1996
- The meeting of the Interparliamentary Union on Peace and Cooperation in the Mediterranean, Alexandria, Egypt, 1995
- The 2nd Inter-parliamentary conference on Security and Cooperation in the Mediterranean, Valletta, Malta, 1995
- The 92nd, 93rd, 94th, 96th, 98th and 102nd Inter-parliamentary Conferences, Copenhagen 1994, Madrid 1995, Bucharest 1995, Beijing 1996, Cairo 1997 Berlin 1999

He participated as a member of Libyan Delegations to several countries
