= Ali Treki =

Libyan diplomat (1937–2015)

- علي التريكي
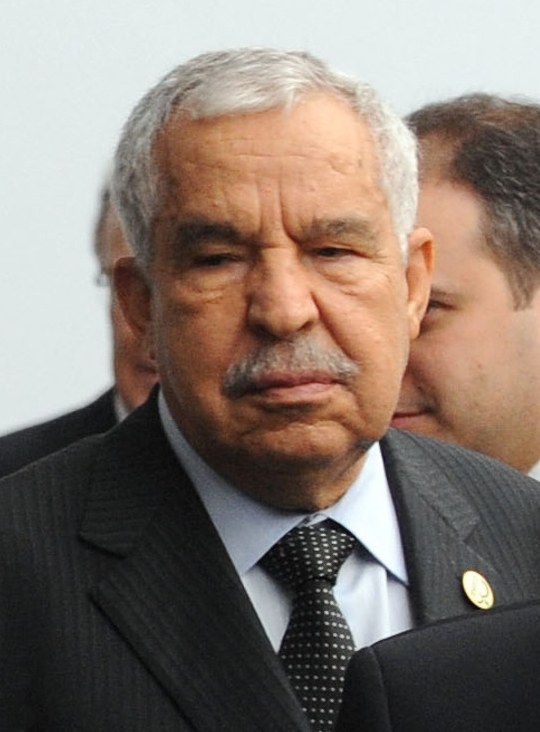
- Treki in 2010

President of the United Nations General Assembly
- In office 15 September 2009 – 14 September 2010
- Preceded by: Miguel d'Escoto Brockmann
- Succeeded by: Joseph Deiss

Permanent Representative of Libya to the United Nations
- In office 18 September 2003 – 4 March 2009
- Preceded by: Abuzed Omar Dorda
- Succeeded by: Abdel Rahman Shalgham

Libyan Ambassador to France
- In office 3 February 1995 – 2001
- Preceded by: Hamed Ahmed El-Houderi
- Succeeded by: Abdessalam Ali El Mazoughi

Foreign Minister of Libya
- In office 1976–1982
- Preceded by: Abdel Moneim al-Huni
- Succeeded by: Abdul Ati al-Obeidi

Personal details
- Born: Ali Abdussalam Treki; 10 October 1937 Misrata, Italian Libya
- Died: 19 October 2015 (aged 78) Cairo, Egypt
- Spouse: Aisha Dihoum (m. 1969)
- Education: Garyounis University; University of Toulouse

Ali Abdussalam Treki (Arabic: علي عبد السلام التريكي; 10 October 1937 – 19 October 2015) was a Libyan diplomat in Muammar Gaddafi's regime. Treki served as one of Libya's top diplomats from the 1970s till the 2011 Libyan Civil War. He was Minister of Foreign Affairs from 1976 to 1982 and again from 1984 to 1986, and was later the permanent representative to the United Nations on several occasions. He was the president of the United Nations General Assembly from September 2009 to September 2010.

== Early life ==
Treki was born in October 1937 in Misrata, to Abdussalem and Amna Treki. He was educated at Garyounis University in Benghazi, and the University of Toulouse in France.

In 1969, he married Aisha Dihoum, with whom he had four children—one son and three daughters.

== Career ==
Working at Libya's foreign ministry, Treki was Minister Plenipotentiary in 1970, Director of the Political Administration from 1970 to 1973, Director of the African Administration from 1973 to 1974 and Assistant Deputy for Political Affairs from 1974 to 1976. He served as the Minister of Foreign Affairs from 1976 to 1982 and as Permanent Representative to the United Nations from 1982 to 1984. Subsequently he returned to his post as Foreign Minister from 1984 to 1986 before resuming his post as Permanent Representative to the UN from 1986 to 1990.

On 8 December 1983, Treki was rebuked by the Secretary General of the United Nations after a speech before the global body in which he urged its members to

Look around New York. Who are the owners of pornographic film operations and houses? Is it not the Jews who are exploiting the American people and trying to debase them? If we succeed in eliminating that entity, we shall by the same token save the American and European peoples.

He became Libya's Ambassador to France on 3 February 1995, and he subsequently served as Secretary for African Affairs from May 1999 to June 2003. He was again posted as Permanent Representative to the UN in 2003. In mid-2004, he was appointed as Special Adviser to Libyan leader Muammar Gaddafi, and on 3 January 2005 he began a tour of African countries, acting as Gaddafi's special envoy, to work toward solutions for several African conflicts and disputes. In mid-January 2005, when a reorganization of the foreign ministry took place, he was named Secretary for African Union Affairs by the General People's Congress of Libya. Libya submitted Treki's candidacy in the election to the post of Chairperson of the African Union Commission at the AU summit in Addis Ababa in early 2008, but it was rejected because it was submitted late.

Treki was the co-chairman of the Pakistan-Libya joint economic commission, and received the award of Hilal-i-Pakistan from President Asif Ali Zardari in May 2010.

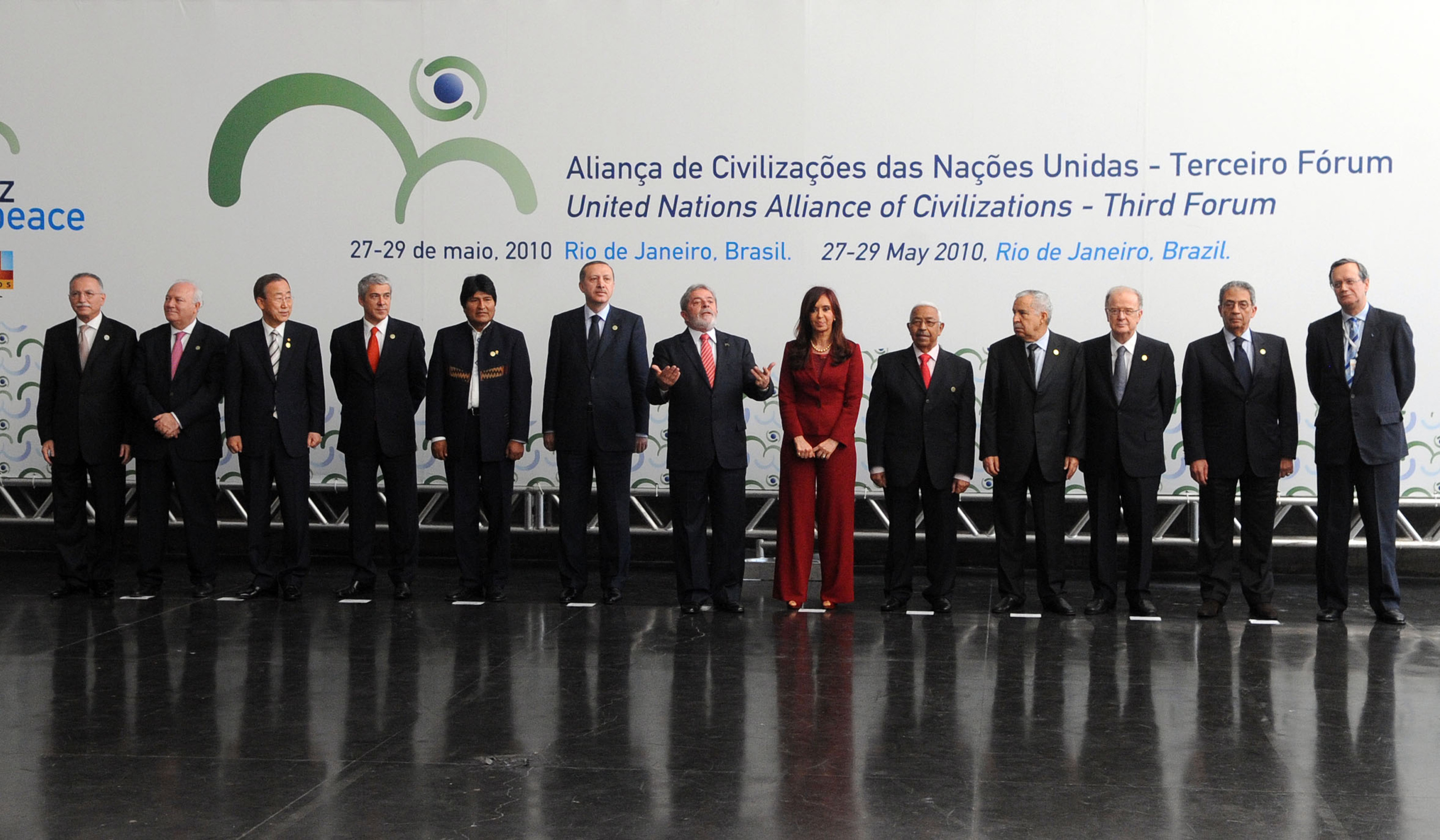
Ali Treki (fourth person from the right) attending the Alliance of Civilizations 2010 Forum

== President of the UN General Assembly ==
In March 2009, Treki was chosen as Libya's top diplomat and nominated to be the next President of the General Assembly. He assumed office on 15 September 2009.

In his presidential opening address to the 64th session of the General Assembly, Treki said: "We must put an end to wars and to their causes and consequences. Dialogue and mutual understanding are the way to resolve our problems. Embargoes and blockades are fruitless: they exacerbate antagonism and rebellion, while undermining respect for the international community."

In June 2010, Treki made the following statement: "In response to questions by correspondents seeking his views on human rights, sexual orientation and gender identity, the president of the General Assembly expressed his support for human rights for all persons without any distinction or discrimination. The President of the General Assembly believes that violence, or discrimination on the basis of sexual orientation or gender identity is unacceptable".

In an interview with Syrian TV which aired on 11 April 2010 (as translated by MEMRI), Treki stated that "[Israel's] siege on Gaza is a disgrace for the entire international community. It is a camp that is worse than the camps of the Nazis in the past."

== Libyan Civil War ==
On 31 March 2011, during the First Libyan Civil War, he resigned and went to Egypt.

In an interview on 1 April in Cairo, Treki said that resolving the conflict would require Libya's becoming a democracy, and that the Gaddafi family must give up power to make way for a transition to democracy under United Nations' auspices.

Treki died in Cairo on 19 October 2015.

Positions in intergovernmental organisations
Preceded by Miguel d'Escoto Brockmann	President of the United Nations General Assembly; 2009–2010	Succeeded by Joseph Deiss
Political offices
Preceded by Abdul Ati al-Obeidi	Foreign Minister of Libya (the second time); 1984–1986	Succeeded by Kamal Hassan Al Mansour
Preceded by Abdul Monem el Houni	Foreign Minister of Libya (the first time); 1976–1982	Succeeded by Abdul Ati al-Obeidi
