= Reda Helal =

Egyptian journalist

Reda Helal (Arabic: رضا هلال) was an Egyptian journalist. He was deputy editor of Al-Ahram newspaper until 11 August 2003 when he disappeared in a presumed kidnapping. He was also a political activist, and a founding member of the Cairo Peace Society (CPS), a Copenhagen criteria support group.

== Disappearance ==
Helal disappeared en route from Al-Ahram's offices to his home in Kasr El Aini on Hospital Street in downtown Cairo on August 11, 2003. One factor which makes his disappearance unusual is that this Hospital Street is one of the most secure streets in the Egyptian capital, as it contains the headquarters of the Arab League, the Egyptian Foreign Ministry, the American Embassy and the Egyptian Museum.

On the day of his disappearance Helal's family presented a complaint about it to Sayyeda Zeinab police station. Human rights groups and activists, as well as a number of journalists, have pressured the Egyptian government over the incident.

== Current development ==
In a response from the Interior Ministry to Talaat Sadat, The Ministry of Interior affirmed that no truth yet on the missing journalist case.

== See also ==
- List of people who disappeared mysteriously: post-1970
