= Omar Pasha Mansour El-Kikhia =

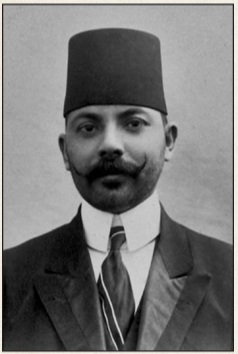
- Omar Pasha Mansour El-Kikhia, Ottoman 3rd Chamber of Deputies Album

Prime Minister of Emirate of Cyrenaica
- In office 1 March 1949 – 18 March 1950
- Preceded by: Emirate of Cyrenaica established
- Succeeded by: Muhammad Sakizli

Personal details
- Born: 1879 Benghazi
- Died: ?

Omar Pasha Mansour El-Kikhia (b. 1879, Benghazi - d. ?), was an Ottoman politician of Libyan Arab origin. He was the first Prime Minister of the Emirate of Cyrenaica.

Born in Benghazi in 1879, he was the son of Omar Pasha El-Kikhia. The Kikhia family was one of the well-known families of Benghazi. He graduated from the tribal school and the Civil Service School. He served as a district governor. On December 7, 1908, he was elected as a Benghazi deputy in the 3rd Chamber of Deputies of the Ottoman Empire with 54 votes. He served as the vice-chairman of the Committee of Union and Progress and as the minutes clerk of the Provincial General Administration Law Committee in the Parliament. He continued his deputy duties in the 4th term as well. Mansur Pasha was a mujahid who fought alongside the leaders of the Senussi order against the Italians in Italo-Turkish War. He is one of the civilian leaders of the resistance. Nuri El-Kikhia, from the same family, is also a well-known patriot and one of the founders of the Omar Mukhtar Union in Libya. Omar Pasha Mansour el-Kikhia was a close associate of Idris al-Senussi, who founded the Emirate of Cyrenaica in Eastern Libya in 1949 and later became the king of unified Libya. He served as the first prime minister of the Emirate of Cyrenaica. He is considered among the founders of modern Libya.

He is the father of Mansour Omar El-Kikhia, a Libyan-American writer, activist, and political science professor.
