= Mifta al-Usta Umar =

Libyan politician (1935–2010)

Secretary-General of the General People's Congress
- In office 15 February 1984 – 7 October 1990
- Leader: Muammar Gaddafi
- Preceded by: Muhammad az-Zaruq Rajab
- Succeeded by: Abdul Razzaq as-Sawsa

Personal details
- Born: 1935 Benghazi, Italian Libya
- Died: 22 March 2010

Mifta al-Usta Umar (Arabic: مفتاح الاسطى عمر; 1935 – 22 March 2010) was the General Secretary of Libya's General People's Congress from 15 February 1984 to 7 October 1990. In this role, he was theoretically Libya's head of state, though Muammar Gaddafi continued to exercise ultimate authority in Libya as "Leader and Guide of the Revolution".

Umar graduated from the Faculty of Medicine at Ain Shams University in Cairo in 1961. He worked as a physician at Massa Hospital in Al-Bayda and, in 1963, became General Manager of the hospital.
