= Libya–Malaysia relations =

- Libya: Malaysia

Libya–Malaysia relations refers to bilateral foreign relations between Libya and Malaysia. Libya has an embassy in Kuala Lumpur, and Malaysia has an embassy in Tripoli.

== History ==
Since the new Libyan government period, the relations between the two countries have been enhanced when Malaysia recognised the new government of National Transitional Council as the interim government of Libya on 26 August 2011.

In 2022, Libya’s ambassador to Malaysia held discussions with Malaysian education officials on expanding higher-education partnership frameworks, including memoranda of understanding, joint research initiatives and student exchange programmes.

In February 2023, the General Union of Chambers of Commerce, Industry and Agriculture of Libya signed a memorandum of understanding with its Malaysian counterpart in Kuala Lumpur to expand trade, and establish a joint chamber of commerce.

On 27 April 2024, to commemorate 50 years of their diplomatic relations, the Libyan Ministry of Foreign Affairs of the Government of National Unity brokered an agreement with its Malaysian counterpart to extend Malaysian entry visas for Libyan nationals.

== Economic relations ==
Libya looks to Malaysia as a model to expand their country's economy. At present, there are six Malaysian oil and gas companies operating in Libya and the country now seeks Malaysian assistance for more investment to develop their country in the aftermath of the destruction suffered in the Libyan Civil War. An agreement on air services was signed in 2009 and both countries agreed to formalize a memorandum of understanding on airlines. Libya also seeks Malaysia's co-operation in Islamic banking.

== Education relations ==
In education, approximately 1,000–1,200 Malaysian students are sponsored by the Libyan government to study in Libya while 2,000 Libyan students will visit Malaysia for vocational training.
