= List of heads of state of Libya =

Chairman of the Presidential Council of the State of Libya
- رئيس المجلس الرئاسي لدولة ليبيا
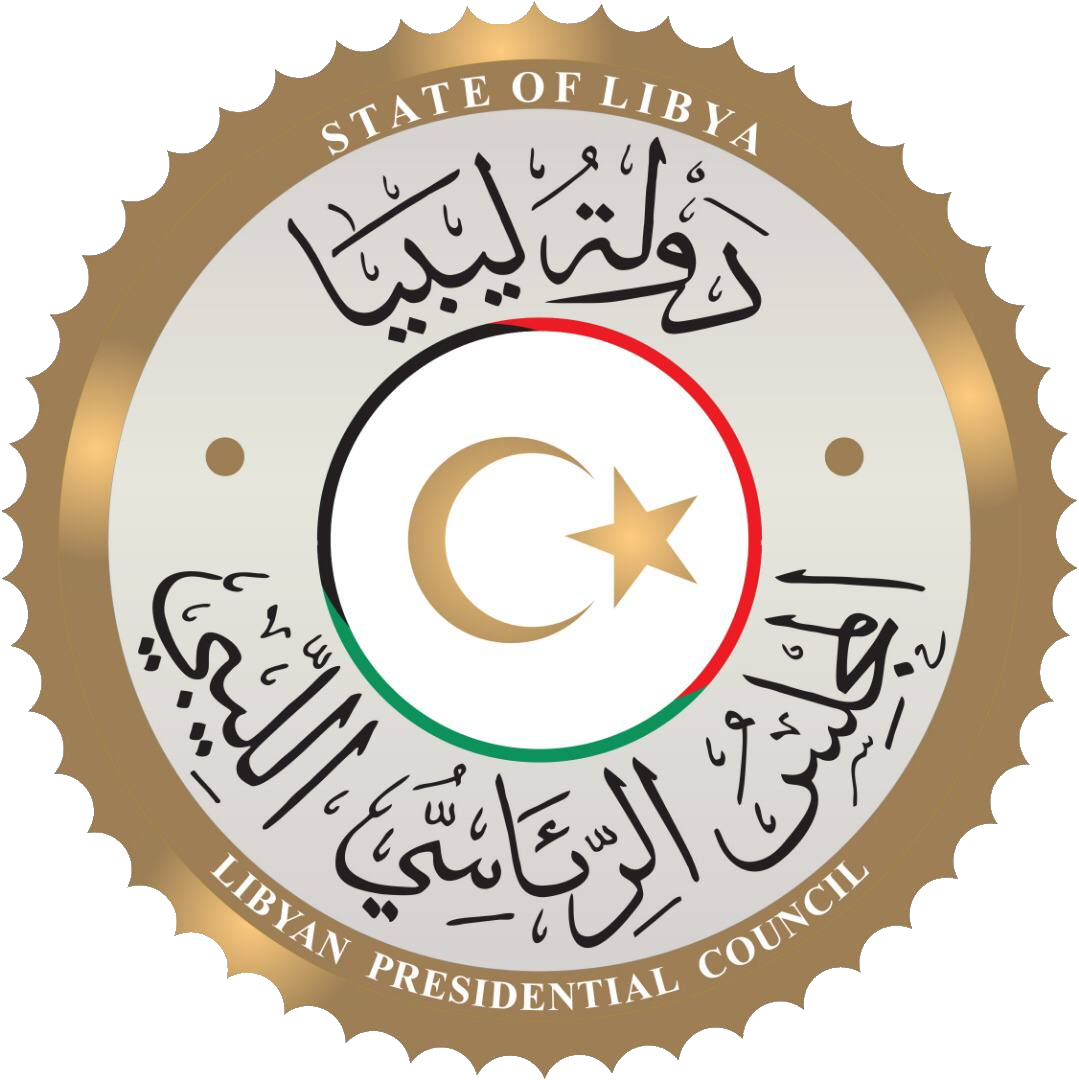
- Seal of the Presidential Council

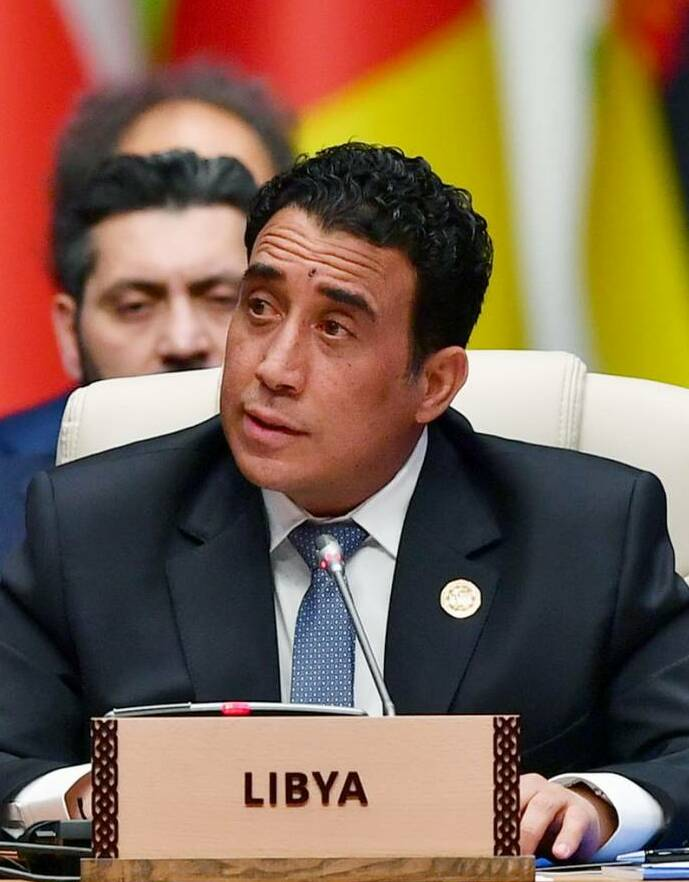
- Incumbent; Mohamed al-Menfi since 15 March 2021
- Government of National Unity
- Style: Mr. Chairman; His Excellency
- Status: Head of state
- Member of: Presidential Council
- Seat: Tripoli, Libya
- Deputy: Vice Chairman of the Presidential Council

This article lists the heads of state of Libya since the country's independence in 1951.

Libya has been in a tumultuous state since the start of the Arab Spring-related Libyan crisis in 2011; the crisis resulted in the collapse of the Libyan Arab Jamahiriya and the killing of Muammar Gaddafi, amidst the First Civil War and the foreign military intervention. The crisis was deepened by the factional violence in the aftermath of the First Civil War, resulting in the outbreak of the Second Civil War in 2014. The control over the country is currently split between the internationally recognized Government of National Unity (GNU) in Tripoli and the rival Government of National Stability (GNS)—supported by the House of Representatives (HoR)—in Tobruk, their respective supporters, as well as various jihadist groups and tribal elements controlling parts of the country.

== Heads of state of Libya (1951–present) ==
=== Kingdom of Libya (1951–1969) ===
No.	Name	Portrait	Lifespan	Reign			Dynasty
No.	Name	Portrait	Lifespan	Reign start	Reign end	Duration	Dynasty
1	Idris I		1889–1983	24 December 1951	1 September 1969	17 years, 251 days	Senussi
1	Idris I		1889–1983	The first and only King of Libya. Deposed in the 1969 revolution.			
=== Libya under Gaddafi (1969–2011) === ==== Libyan Arab Republic (1969–1977) ====
No.	Name	Portrait	Lifespan	Term of office			Political affiliation
No.	Name	Portrait	Lifespan	Took office	Left office	Time in office	Political affiliation
2	Muammar Gaddafi		1942–2011	1 September 1969	2 March 1977	7 years, 182 days	Military / Arab Socialist Union
2	Muammar Gaddafi		1942–2011	Chairman of the Revolutionary Command Council (RCC). Gaddafi dissolved the RCC on 2 March 1977, after the General People's Congress (GPC) adopted the Declaration on the Establishment of the Authority of the People.			
==== Libyan Arab Jamahiriya (1977–2011) ====
(2)	Muammar Gaddafi		1942–2011	2 March 1977	2 March 1979	2 years	Military / Independent (Islamic socialist)
(2)	Muammar Gaddafi		1942–2011	Secretary-General of the GPC. Gaddafi renounced all government functions on 2 March 1979. However, as leader of the revolution (officially "Brotherly Leader and Guide of the Revolution"), he retained ultimate control over Libya until he was deposed and killed during the First Civil War in 2011.			
3	Abdul Ati al-Obeidi		1939–2023	2 March 1979	7 January 1981	1 year, 311 days	Independent (Islamic socialist)
3	Abdul Ati al-Obeidi		1939–2023	Secretary-General of the GPC. Previously served as Secretary-General of the General People's Committee (Prime Minister), from 1977 to 1979.			
4	Muhammad az-Zaruq Rajab		born 1940	7 January 1981	15 February 1984	3 years, 39 days	Independent (Islamic socialist)
4	Muhammad az-Zaruq Rajab		born 1940	Secretary-General of the GPC. Afterwards served as Secretary-General of the General People's Committee (Prime Minister), from 1984 to 1986.			
5	Mifta al-Usta Umar		1935–2010	15 February 1984	7 October 1990	6 years, 234 days	Independent (Islamic socialist)
5	Mifta al-Usta Umar		1935–2010	Secretary-General of the GPC. Served at the time of the 1986 United States bombing (Operation El Dorado Canyon).			
6	Abdul Razzaq as-Sawsa		1933–2016	7 October 1990	18 January 1992	1 year, 103 days	Independent (Islamic socialist)
6	Abdul Razzaq as-Sawsa		1933–2016	Secretary-General of the GPC.			
7	Muhammad az-Zanati		1937–2025	18 January 1992	3 March 2008	16 years, 45 days	Independent (Islamic socialist)
7	Muhammad az-Zanati		1937–2025	Secretary-General of the GPC.			
8	Miftah Muhammed K'eba		born 1947	3 March 2008	5 March 2009	1 year, 2 days	Independent (Islamic socialist)
8	Miftah Muhammed K'eba		born 1947	Secretary-General of the GPC.			
9	Imbarek Shamekh		born 1952	5 March 2009	26 January 2010	327 days	Independent (Islamic socialist)
9	Imbarek Shamekh		born 1952	Secretary-General of the GPC. Previously served as Secretary-General of the General People's Committee (Prime Minister), from 2000 to 2003.			
10	Mohamed Abu al-Qasim al-Zwai		born 1952	26 January 2010	23 August 2011	1 year, 209 days	Independent (Islamic socialist)
10	Mohamed Abu al-Qasim al-Zwai		born 1952	Secretary-General of the GPC. Served at the time of the First Civil War and the concurrent foreign military intervention. Deposed during the Battle of Tripoli.			
=== Transitional period (2011–present) ===
11	Mustafa Abdul Jalil		born 1952	5 March 2011	8 August 2012	1 year, 156 days	Independent
11	Mustafa Abdul Jalil		born 1952	Chairman of the National Transitional Council (NTC). In rebellion to 23 August 2011, based in Benghazi during this period.			
—	Mohammed Ali Salim		1935–2022	8 August 2012	9 August 2012	1 day	Independent
—	Mohammed Ali Salim		1935–2022	Acting President of the General National Congress (GNC). Symbolic head of state for the handover of power from the NTC.			
12	Mohammed Magariaf		born 1940	9 August 2012	28 May 2013	292 days	National Front Party
12	Mohammed Magariaf		born 1940	President of the GNC. Resigned to comply with the Political Isolation Law passed by the GNC on 14 May 2013.			
—	Giuma Ahmed Atigha		born 1950	28 May 2013	25 June 2013	28 days	Independent
—	Giuma Ahmed Atigha		born 1950	Acting President of the GNC.			
13	Nouri Abusahmain		born 1956	25 June 2013	5 April 2016	2 years, 285 days	Independent
13	Nouri Abusahmain		born 1956	President of the GNC. In rebellion, based in Tripoli. Internationally recognized until 4 August 2014.			
Following the 2014 parliamentary election, the government was split between the newly-elected House of Representatives (HoR) and the outgoing GNC, resulting in the Second Civil War. The 2014 elections were declared invalid by the Supreme Court in November 2014.
—	Abu Bakr Baira		1941–2026	4 August 2014	5 August 2014	1 day	Independent
—	Abu Bakr Baira		1941–2026	Acting President of the House of Representatives (HoR). Symbolic head of state for the handover of power from the GNC.			
14	Aguila Saleh Issa		born 1944	5 August 2014	15 March 2021	6 years, 222 days	Independent
14	Aguila Saleh Issa		born 1944	President of the HoR. In rebellion, based in Tobruk. Internationally recognized until 12 March 2016.			
Following the inauguration of the Presidential Council and the Government of National Accord (GNA), the government remained split between the HoR and the National Salvation Government (NSG), recreated after the 2016 coup attempt. Afterwards, the High Council of the Revolution was created as well. However, the High Council of State (HCS), based in Tripoli, recognized the GNA.
15	Fayez al-Sarraj		born 1960	30 March 2016	15 March 2021	4 years, 350 days	Independent
15	Fayez al-Sarraj		born 1960	Chairman of the Presidential Council. Simultaneously served as Prime Minister of the Government of National Accord (GNA). Internationally recognized, based in Tripoli.			
16	Mohamed al-Menfi		born 1976	15 March 2021	Incumbent	5 years, 233 days	Independent
16	Mohamed al-Menfi		born 1976	Chairman of the Presidential Council. Internationally recognized, based in Tripoli.			

== See also ==
- List of governors-general of Italian Libya
- List of heads of government of Libya
- Brotherly Leader and Guide of the Revolution
