= Mansour Omar El-Kikhia =

Libyan-American author, columnist and activist

Mansour Omar El-Kikhia is a Libyan-American author, columnist, activist and professor of political science. El-Kikhia is chair of the Department of Political Science and Geography at the University of Texas at San Antonio. He is well known for his published criticisms of Libyan leader Muammar Gaddafi.

== Personal life ==
His father Omar Pasha Mansour El-Kikhia was the first prime minister of Cyrenaica. His cousin, Mansour Rashid El-Kikhia, was the former Libyan Minister of Foreign Affairs.

El-Kikhia has three children.

== Media Appearances ==
El-Kikhia was featured in an episode of the Netflix original production "How to Become a Tyrant". The documentary featured his expert commentary on the rule of Muammar Gaddafi and the contraction of civil liberties under Gaddafi's regime.

== Publications ==
- Gaddafi and the policy of contradictions.
