= Mohamed Abu al-Qasim al-Zwai =

Libyan politician

- محمد أبو القاسم الزوي

Secretary General of General People's Congress of Libya
- In office 26 January 2010 – 23 August 2011
- Prime Minister: Baghdadi Mahmudi
- Leader: Muammar Gaddafi
- Preceded by: Imbarek Shamekh
- Succeeded by: Mustafa Abdul Jalil (Chairperson of the National Transitional Council)

Personal details
- Born: 14 May 1952 (age 74)

Mohamed Abu al-Qasim al-Zwai (born 14 May 1952) is a Libyan politician who was the last Secretary General of Libya's General People's Congress and thus the country's nominal head of state from 2010 until 2011. He replaced Imbarek Shamekh as the GPC secretary general. He was reportedly a longtime personal friend of Muammar Gaddafi and credited with first introducing Gaddafi to Abdessalam Jalloud, who was Libya's Prime Minister of Libya in the 1970s. As of 8 September 2011, he was in custody of the NTC forces.

In June 2013, Zwai was acquitted of wasting public money but remained incarcerated. In July 2015, he was sentenced to 12 years in prison. He was released in 2016 based on health grounds.

In April 2017, Zwai was appointed advisor for Maghreb Affairs by the Speaker of the House of Representatives, Aguila Saleh Issa.

In May 2018, Zwai was among the high-profile Gaddafi loyalists who declared their support for Khalifa Haftar at a forum in Benghazi.

Political offices
Preceded by Imbarek Shamekh	Secretary General of General People's Congress of Libya; 2010–2011	Succeeded by Mustafa Abdul Jalil as Chairperson of the National Transitional Council of Libya
