= Muhammad Ahmad al-Mangoush =

Prime Minister of Libya (1937–2016)

- محمد أحمد المنقوش

Prime Minister of Libya
- In office 29 December 1997 – 1 March 2000
- Leader: Muammar Gaddafi
- Preceded by: Abdul Majid al-Qa′ud
- Succeeded by: Imbarek Shamekh

Personal details
- Born: 1 March 1937 Libya
- Died: 27 March 2016 (aged 79)
- Occupation: Politician

Muhammad Ahmad al-Mangoush (Arabic: محمد أحمد المنقوش; 1 March 1937 – 27 March 2016) was General Secretary of the People's Committee in Libya (prime minister) from 29 December 1997 to 1 March 2000.

== See also ==
- List of heads of government of Libya

Preceded by Abdul Majid al-Qa′ud	General Secretary of the General People's Committee of Libya; December 29, 1997 – March 1, 2000	Succeeded by Imbarek Shamekh
