= Shukri Ghanem =

Libyan Prime Minister (1942–2012)

Shukri Mohammed Imhemed Ghanem
- شكري محمد إمحمد غانم
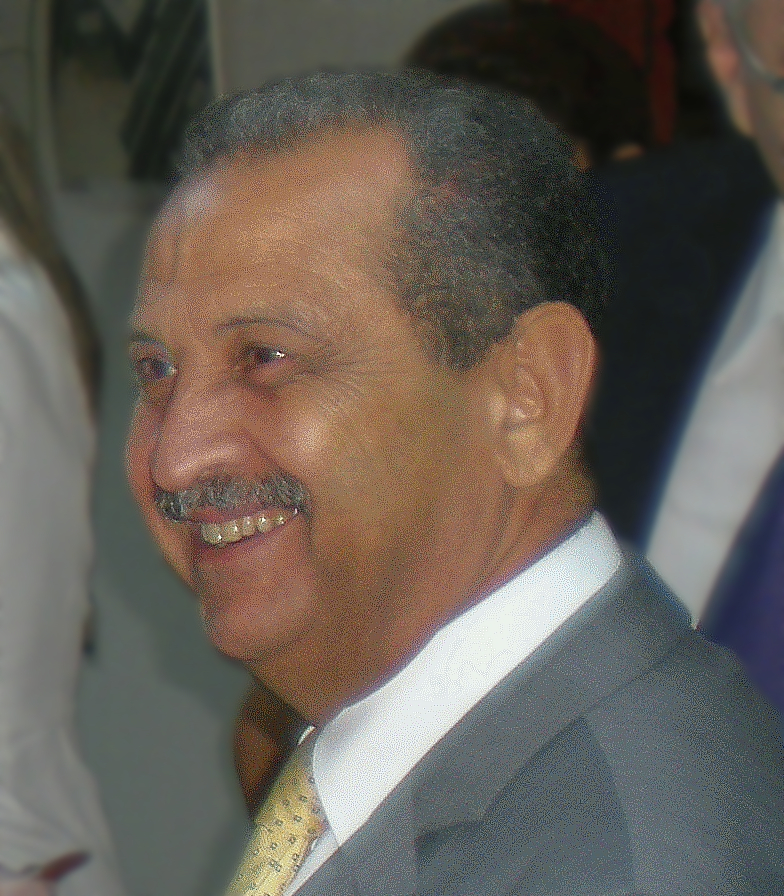
- Ghanem in 2010

Minister of Oil
- In office 1 March 2006 – 16 May 2011
- Preceded by: Fathi Ben Shatwan
- Succeeded by: Position abolished

Prime Minister of Libya
- In office 14 June 2003 – 5 March 2006
- Leader: Muammar Gaddafi
- Preceded by: Imbarek Shamekh
- Succeeded by: Baghdadi Mahmudi

Personal details
- Born: 9 October 1942 Tripoli, Italian Libya
- Died: 29 April 2012 (aged 69) Vienna, Austria
- Education: Garyounis University; Tufts University

Shukri Mohammed Ghanem (Arabic: شكري محمد إمحمد غانم 9 October 1942 – 29 April 2012) was a Libyan politician who was the General Secretary of the General People's Committee of Libya (prime minister) from June 2003 until March 2006 when, in the first major government reshuffle in over a decade, he was replaced by his deputy, Baghdadi Mahmudi. Ghanem subsequently served as the Minister of Oil until 2011. On 29 April 2012, his body was found floating on the New Danube, Vienna.

Early in the Libyan Civil War he reportedly "fled", but after the city of Ra's Lanuf was recaptured by pro-government forces, AP reported on 13 March that he asked Eni SpA for help with putting out a fire at the Ra's Lanuf Refinery. On 16 May, Al Arabiya and the NTC reported that Shukri Ghanem had defected to Tunisia. The next day Tunisian security officials confirmed that he was indeed in Tunisia.

== Early life and education ==
Ghanem was born in Tripoli, at the time capital of Italian Libya, on 9 October 1942. He studied economics at Garyounis University in Benghazi and graduated in 1963. He also held PhD in international economics from the Fletcher School of Law and Diplomacy at Tufts University and Harvard University in 1975.

== Career ==
Ghanem was previously in charge of the OPEC secretariat, and was the director of its research division. He served as deputy director and director of foreign trade at the Ministry of Economy in Libya; was director of marketing of Libya's National Oil Corporation (NOC); was director of economic affairs and under secretary and chief advisor at the Ministry of Petroleum in Libya. In 2003, Ghanem was appointed general secretary of the General People's Committee or Prime Minister. In March 2006, Ghanem was appointed Chairman of Libya's NOC. He tendered his resignation from NOC in August 2009 amidst probable disagreements within the Libyan government over the development of the oil sector.

After defection to Vienna in 2011, he served as a consultant for a Vienna-based company until his death.

== Post Lockerbie bombing raproachment ==
Libya had been diplomatically isolated and subject to international sanctions since the November 1991 indictment of two Libyans for the bombing of Pan Am Flight 103 on 21 December 1988 (the Lockerbie bombing). Following Ghanem's appointment as prime minister, Libya successfully sought re-entry into the international community and the lifting of sanctions. Ghanem was seen as the main spokesman and architect of this rapprochement, which included paying $2.16 billion compensation in August 2003 to the families of the 270 people who died in the bombing, and renouncing weapons of mass destruction.

In February 2004, Ghanem was interviewed on the BBC Radio 4 Today program. He stirred controversy in the interview by repudiating Libya's responsibility both for the 1988 Lockerbie bombing and the 1984 murder of British WPC Yvonne Fletcher (who was shot and killed in April 1984 outside the Libyan Embassy in London). This incident led to the severing of UK/Libya diplomatic relations.

After the problems we [Libya] have been facing because of the sanctions, the loss of money, we thought that it was easier for us to buy peace and this is why we agreed a compensation," Ghanem said in the interview.

When asked whether the payment of compensation meant that Libya did not accept any guilt or responsibility, Ghanem replied:

I agree with that, and this is why I say we bought peace.

Under pressure from the United States and Britain, Ghanem's comments were quickly retracted by Gaddafi.

It is unclear whether Shukri Ghanem's dismissal as prime minister in 2006 was a consequence of those controversial remarks he made two years earlier.

== Libyan civil war ==
On 16 May 2011, it was reported that Ghanem has defected from the Gaddafi government and fled, which was confirmed the next day by Tunisian security officials. On 8 April 2011, against the background of the Libyan Civil War, the US Treasury department announced sanctions against him. In May 2011, he defected to Rome and then, Vienna. On 1 June 2011, Ghanem confirmed in Rome, that he had decided to join the Libyan opposition.

He was mistrusted by the new Libyan government due to his close friendship with the Gaddafi family, and particularly Saif al-Islam Gaddafi. Prior to his death, the interim Libyan government was preparing an Interpol arrest warrant against him, to investigate his mismanagement of oil production. At the same time, he was also wanted as a witness in the trial against Saif al-Islam Gaddafi. His diary had also been acquired by investigators of financing allegations against French President Nicolas Sarkozy during the former president's 2007 election campaign.

== Personal life ==
Ghanem was married and had three daughters and one son.

== Death ==
Ghanem then lived with his family in Vienna, Austria, where he had an apartment and where his daughters also lived. Prior to his death, Ghanem had expressed concerns about the latest developments in Libya.

Ghanem's body was found fully clothed floating on 29 April 2012 in a branch of the River Danube though there were no signs of violence. He was 69. An Austrian foreign ministry official said the family initially told the ministry that Ghanem had died of a heart attack, which was later denied by police. A BBC report noted the cause of death was not clear and that police had ordered a post-mortem. Toxicology tests were still being undertaken after Ghanem's body had been released for burial. His body, in a coffin wrapped in a white flag, was returned to Tripoli and buried there at the beginning of May 2012.

== Posthumous allegations ==
On 1 May 2012, Reuters reported that Ghanem's associates at other OPEC countries, including former Iraqi Oil Minister Issam Chalabi, did not believe the official account of his death.

In March 2019, The Independent reported that Ghanem was the go-between for many of the bribes paid to the Gaddafi regime by companies in the Western world, most notably Yara International. According to Norwegian and Swiss prosecutors, Ghanem's son Mohammed served as the "bag man" in the Yara case and Yara had deposited at least $1.5 million into an account belonging to a company registered in the British Virgin Islands that was operated by Mohammed Ghanem. Dutch prosecutors were simultaneously pursuing a case against a $700 million hedge fund operated by Ghanem's son-in-law, Ismael Abudher. According to Dutch investigators, Abudher owned at least twelve British Virgin Islands shell companies and were using them to embezzle money from Libya's sovereign wealth fund, the Libyan Investment Authority.

In June 2022, Vanity Fair alleged that Ghanem was worth billions of Qaddafi's ill-gotten money at the time of his death due to corruption and raised the possibility that his death was due to foul play.

== See also ==
- General People's Committee of Libya

Political offices
Preceded by Mubarak Abdallah al-Shamikh	General Secretary of the General People's Committee of Libya; 14 June 2003 – 5 March 2006	Succeeded by Baghdadi Mahmudi
