= Abdul Majid al-Qa′ud =

Libyan politician (1943–2021)

Abdul Majid al-Qaʿud عبد المجيد القعود

Prime Minister of Libya
- In office 29 January 1994 – 2 March 1997
- Preceded by: Abuzed Omar Dorda
- Succeeded by: Muhammad Ahmad al-Mangoush

Personal details
- Born: 1943 Italian Libya
- Died: 4 March 2021 (aged 78) Istanbul, Turkey

Abdul Majid al-Qaʿud (Arabic: عبد المجيد القعود; 1943 – 4 March 2021) was a veteran Libyan politician under Muammar Gaddafi. He served as mayor of Tripoli from 1971 to 1972, minister of agriculture from 1972 to 1976, minister of energy from 1978 to 1982, and General Secretary of the People's Committee (Prime Minister) from 29 January 1994 to 1 March 1997.

In May 2018, al-Qa'ud was among the high-profile Gaddafi loyalists who declared their support for Khalifa Haftar at a forum in Benghazi.

Al-Qaʿud died in Istanbul, Turkey on 4 March 2021, at the age of 78.

Preceded by Abuzed Omar Dorda	General Secretary of the General People's Committee of Libya; 29 January 1994 – 2 March 1997	Succeeded by Muhammad Ahmad al-Mangoush
