= Baghdadi Mahmudi =

Prime Minister of Libya, 2006–2011

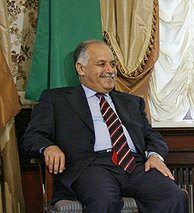
- Mahmudi in 2008

Prime Minister of Libya
- In office 5 March 2006 – 23 August 2011
- Leader: Muammar Gaddafi
- Preceded by: Shukri Ghanem
- Succeeded by: Mahmoud Jibril (as Chairman of the Executive Office of the National Transitional Council

Personal details
- Born: Baghdadi Ali Mahmudi البغدادي علي المحمودي; 1945 (age 80–81) Zawiya, British Tripolitania (now Libya)

Baghdadi Ali Mahmudi (Arabic: البغدادي علي المحمودي; born 1945) is a Libyan politician who was Secretary of the General People's Committee (prime minister) of Libya from 5 March 2006 to as late as 1 September 2011, when he acknowledged the collapse of the GPCO and the ascendance of the National Transitional Council as a result of the Libyan Civil War. He has a medical degree, specialising in obstetrics and gynecology, and had served as Deputy Prime Minister to Prime Minister Shukri Ghanem since 2003 at the time he was appointed to replace him. He was a part of Gaddafi's inner circle at least prior to his escape in mid-2011. He was arrested in Tunisia for illegal border entry and jailed for six months, although this was later overruled on appeal, however a Tunisian court decided to extradite Mahmoudi to Libya under a request from Libya's Transitional Council.

Mahmudi was released from prison on 20 July 2019.

== Background ==
Mahmudi came from the Zawiya District of northwestern Libya. He was trained as a physician, and in 1992 was appointed Minister of Health and Social Security. In 1997, he was replaced in that ministry by Suleiman al-Ghamari and from then until 2000 Mahmudi was the Minister for the People's Committees' Affairs. For seven months in 2000 (March–September), he was the deputy prime minister for Services Affairs. Mahmudi then became Minister of Human Resources Affairs for six months, and then Minister for Infrastructure, Urban Planning and Environment Affairs for five months. In September 2001, he was appointed deputy prime minister for Production Affairs. On 7 March 2004, he became the deputy prime minister for Libya (Assistant Secretary of the General People's Committee).

On 5 March 2006, Mahmudi was appointed to head the Libyan government, as Secretary of the General People's Committee; although it is believed by the United States and many other nations that Muammar Gaddafi was the de facto chief of state. In addition to being prime minister, he chaired the High Council for Oil & Gas which was created in September 2006 to improve decision making in the petroleum sector, as well chairing the Libyan Investment Authority (LIA) which was created in 2007 to restructure state enterprises.

== Politics ==
From 2006 until 2011, Mahmudi was the Secretary of the General People's Committee and headed the Liaison Office of the Revolutionary Committees. He also held the chairmanship of both the Libyan Investment Authority (one of the largest sovereign wealth funds in the world) and the Libyan Oil and Gas Council. On 26 February 2011, the United Nations Security Council issued Resolution 1970 which imposed a travel ban on Mahmudi.

As deputy secretary-general of Libya's General People's Committee for Production Affairs, he oversaw the development of the two large infrastructure projects in Libya:

- Great man-made river project, and
- Railways project

The three-phase river project alone is estimated to total more than US$18.5 billion.

Mahmudi answered questions about the cost and benefit of the projects, as follows: "We would like to focus very much in investment projects using this water, basically agriculture and animal stock projects. For this sector it has been allocated already a high percentage of the development funds. For this reason, we are concluding several agreements with foreign companies that are interested in investing in these projects, like for example in the Benghazi plains."

Mahmudi has also stated that Libya has amassed more than US$100 billion in a sovereign wealth fund, to benefit future generations after the country's oil reserves (the largest in Africa) have been consumed.

== Refuge in Tunisia ==
On 21 August 2011, amid the Battle of Tripoli, Mahmudi reportedly fled to Djerba, a resort island in Tunisia. Supporters of the anti-Gaddafi movement attempted to storm the hotel where he was staying, according to the reports, but were unsuccessful. On 22 September 2011, Mahumdi was detained and sentenced to 6 months in jail for illegally entering Tunisia without a visa. An appeals court approved the decision to extradite him to Libya on 8 November.

On 1 September 2011, Mahmudi told an Arabic news channel that he supports those fighting against the former Libyan leader. He made the comments to Al Arabiya television which broadcast details in brief headlines. Mahmudi said he was still in Libya and in contact with the National Transitional Council now in charge, Al Arabiya reported.

== Arrest, extradition, trial, and release ==
On 8 November 2011, it was reported that a Tunisian court ruled that Mahmudi should be extradited to Libya. His lawyer, Mabrouk Korchid, said that "The judge decided to extradite him to Libya, it’s an unfair decision, a political decision. If any harm comes to him in Libya, the Tunisian justice system will be a party to that".

On 4 December 2011, Tunisian interim President Foued Mebazaa confirmed that he would not sign a decree to extradite Mahmudi due to fears that he would be subjected to torture if returned to Libya.

On 21 December 2011, it was reported that Mahmudi's health was "seriously degraded" following a hunger strike in his prison.

On 12 May 2012, it was revealed that Mahmudi's phone was wiretapped during the Libyan Civil War and recordings of his mobile phone calls from February to June 2011 were released by Al Jazeera.

On 24 June 2012, it was reported that Mahmudi was finally extradited to Libya. His lawyer argued that Mahmoudi was beaten by Libyan security officers in Tripoli after his extradition.

His trial began on 10 December 2012 in Libya. He was accused of aiding the state to kill civilians and financial crimes. The trial has been deferred on several occasions and, as of 2014, has not resulted in a verdict.

On 20 July 2019, Mahmudi was released for health reasons.

In January 2022, Mahmoudi, who had distanced himself from politics and was allegedly living in the United Arab Emirates, filed a complaint against Tunisia before the Libyan institutions and before the international criminal court for his 2012 extradition from Tunis to Tripoli.

== See also ==
- General People's Committee of Libya
- List of heads of government of Libya

Political offices
Preceded by Shukri Ghanem	Prime Minister of Libya; 2006–2011	Succeeded by Mahmoud Jibril; Acting
