= Former members of the Libyan Islamic Fighting Group =

Libyan Islamists

Since the late 1990s, several members of the Libyan Islamic Fighting Group (a paramilitary Islamist group, considered a terrorist organization by the United Kingdom and the United States) had decided to leave the band, most of them joining other armed organizations.

Since the late 1990s onwards and after the 9/11 attacks, hundreds of LIFG members joined the Al-Qaeda and Taliban ranks during the Afghanistan War.

Between 2007 and 2011, incarcerated leaders of the LIFG held secretive talks with Libyan security officers with the mediation of Saif al-Islam Gaddafi (son of Libyan leader Muammar Gaddafi) and Libyan Islamist leader Ali al-Sallabi, which resulted in the publication of a document called "Corrective Studies" (viewed by the LIFG leaders as a "new code for jihad") and the release of around 300 LIFG imprisoned members, process that continued until February 2011 and the beginning of the Libyan Civil War.

The following is a non-exhaustive list of former members of the Libyan Islamic Fighting Group:

- Abdel-Hakim al-Hasidi - former LIFG leading member, former Abu Salim Martyrs Brigade commander, Islamist politician.
- Abu Idris al-Libi - former senior LIFG member, Islamist politician and head of the national border guard in Southern Libya, brother of Abu Yahia al-Libi.
- Abdel-Hakim al-Jiritli (a.k.a. Abu Hafs al-Libi) - former LIFG member, Al-Qaeda in Iraq member killed in 2004 by United States troops in Iraq.
- Abdullah Said al Libi - former LIFG member, Al Qaeda commander killed in 2009 by a US unmanned predator drone in Pakistan.
- Abu Laith al-Libi - former LIFG founder and leader, senior Al Qaeda commander killed in 2008 by a CIA targeted killing drone attack in Waziristan, Pakistan.
- Abu Malik al-Libi - former LIFG member, killed in 2011 by the Libyan Army in Al Burayqah.
- Abu Yahia al-Libi - former member of the LIFG, senior Al Qaeda commander killed in 2012 by a United States drone strike in Waziristan, Pakistan.
- Abu Sufian bin Qumu - former LIFG member and Guantanamo Bay Detention Camp detainee, leader of Ansar al-Sharia in Derna.
- Abdelhakim Belhadj - former leader (emir) of the LIFG, former head of the Tripoli Military Council (2011-2012), leader of the Islamist Al Watan party.
- Ali Mohamed al-Fakheri (a.k.a. Ibn al-Shaykh al-Libi) - former LIFG member, senior Al-Qaeda member who led the Khalden training camp in Afghanistan, died in 2009 in Abu Salim Prison, Libya.
- Abu Anas al-Libi - former LIFG member, senior Al-Qaeda member.
- Atiyah Abdul-Rahman - former LIFG member, senior Al-Qaeda member killed in 2011 by a CIA predator drone strike in Pakistan.
- Moussa Mohamed Kalifa - alleged LIFG member, suspect of terrorism.
- Noman Benotman - former LIFG shura council member, Quilliam Foundation analyst of Libyan Islamism.
- Wanis al-Sharif - former LIFG member, former Libyan Deputy Interior Minister (2011-2012).
