= Qatar and state-sponsored terrorism =

Qatar-related controversy

Qatar has been accused of allowing terror financiers to operate within its borders, which has been one of the justifications for the Qatar diplomatic crisis that started in 2017 and ended in 2021. In 2014, David S. Cohen, then United States Under Secretary of the Treasury for Terrorism and Financial Intelligence, accused Qatari authorities of allowing financiers who were on international blacklists to live freely in the country: "There are U.S.- and UN-designated terrorist financiers in Qatar that have not been acted against under Qatari law." Accusations come from a wide variety of sources including intelligence reports, government officials, and journalists.

In response to these allegations, the Emir of Qatar, Sheikh Tamim bin Hamad Al-Thani, in September 2014 went on US television to defend his government against claims that it harbors terrorist financiers. In an interview with Christiane Amanpour on CNN, the Emir stated he does not consider those organizations to be terrorists.

The Qatari government has a designated terrorist list. According to The Telegraph, the list contained no names in 2014. In July 2021, the list contained more than 550 people and 240 entities. Qatar uses it to vet passengers flying internationally. Despite Qatar's efforts to arraign prominent terrorist financiers, many designated terrorists and terrorist financiers live with impunity in Qatar.

Qatar has been accused of supporting Hamas, the Palestinian group designated as a terrorist organization by the US and western European countries. Qatar denies these allegations, stating that it does not support Hamas' political position, and that its policy is to help facilitate constructive engagement between Hamas and the Palestinian Authority. Despite this, Hamas leadership lived and worked in Doha. Whether Qatari officials wanted them out is still debated. Hamas leaders were taken in by Turkey and other states. The Hamas offices remain open in Doha.

In 2004, 2010, 2014, and 2017, the Qatari government introduced new anti-terror laws to combat terrorism, terrorism financing and related crimes. In 2019, the Qatari government introduced a new anti-money laundering and counter terror financing laws.

== Background ==
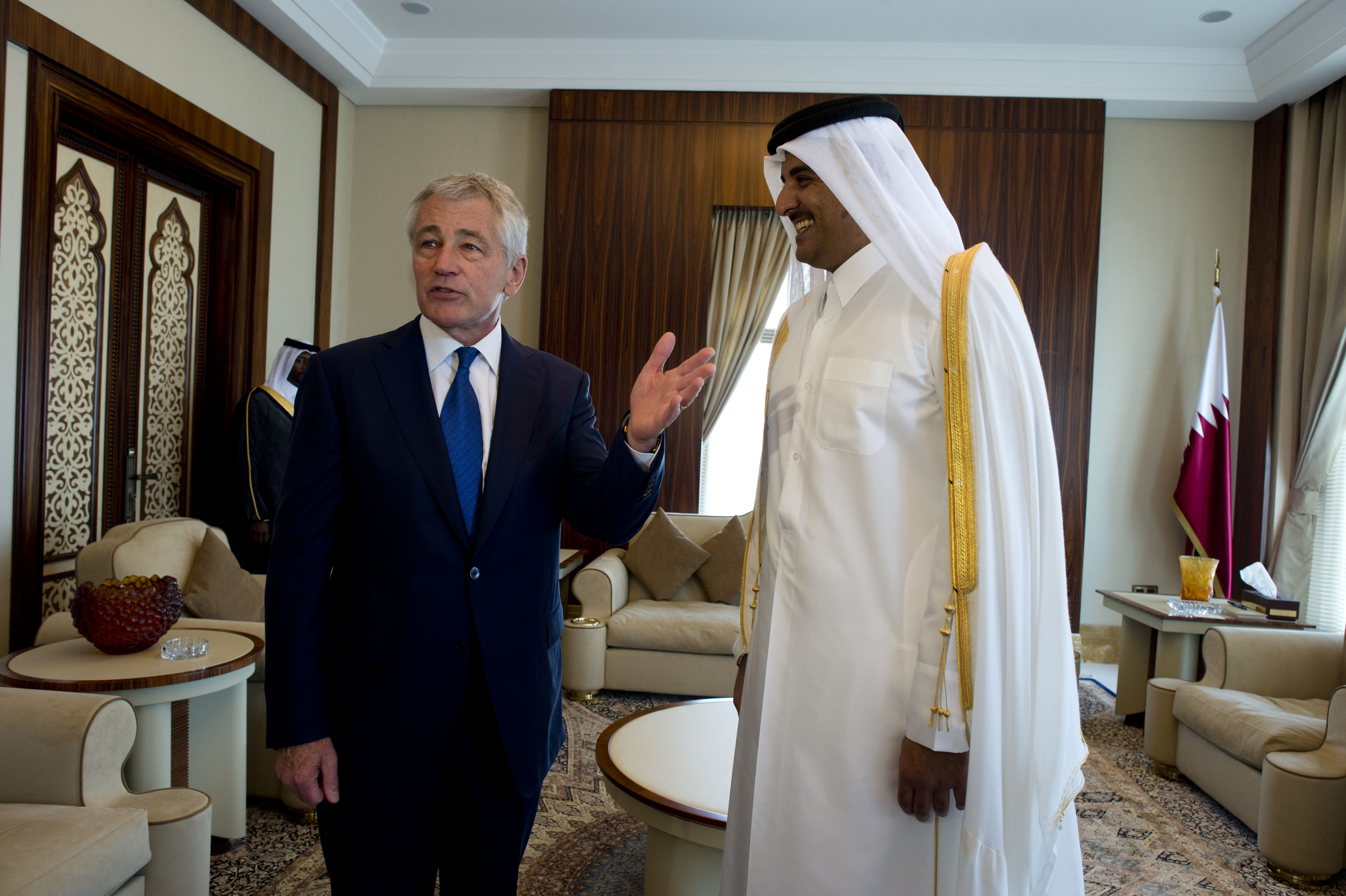
Emir Tamim bin Hamad Al Thani with U.S. Secretary of Defense Chuck Hagel

In 2003, the U.S. Congress was made aware that a plethora of charities based in Qatar were supporting al-Qaeda's activities by helping move and launder funds for the terrorist group. In 2010, it was reported that the violence in Afghanistan and Pakistan was partly bankrolled by wealthy, conservative donors across the Arabian Sea whose governments do little to stop them. Other Arab countries which were listed as sources of militant money were Saudi Arabia, Kuwait, and the United Arab Emirates. In December 2013, the United States designated a Qatari citizen, Abd Al-Rahman al-Nuaimi, as a Specially Designated Global Terrorist (SDGT). The U.S. Treasury Department placed sanctions on Nuaymi and declared him a "Qatar-based terrorist financier and facilitator who has provided money and material support and conveyed communications to al-Qa'ida and its affiliates in Syria, Iraq, Somalia and Yemen for more than a decade."

Qatar was involved in Libya's civil war in 2011 as part of the multi-state NATO-led coalition, mainly by arming and funding groups fighting to topple the dictator Gaddafi. According to the Releifweb Libya had unavoidably been affected by the diplomatic crisis in the Middle East that had pitted a coalition of Arab nations against Qatar. The House of Representatives (HoR) and Khalifa Haftar's anti-Islamist Libyan National Army (LNA) are supported by the United Arab Emirates (UAE) and Egypt, while Qatar and (to a lesser extent) Turkey support the Presidency Council/Government of National Accord, which is based in Tripoli and is recognized by the UN (GNA).

Furthermore, in an August 2014 op-ed published in The New York Times entitled "Club Med for Terrorists", Ron Prosor, then Permanent Representative of Israel to the United Nations, alleged that Qatar sought to improve its global image by funding prominent foreign universities in Doha and hosting the 2022 World Cup while simultaneously supporting Hamas, al-Qaeda, and the Muslim Brotherhood.

In December 2014, Congressman Brad Sherman (D-CA) and Congressman Peter Roskam (R-IL) requested that the U.S. government, in a letter to the Secretary of the Treasury, impose sanctions on Qatar. The two congressmen asked for a full report on activities within Qatar from individuals, charities and organizations that fund Hamas, ISIS, Al-Qaeda, and the al-Nusra Front. The State Department responded to the lawmakers' letters by stating that the US has a "productive relationship with Qatar", pointing out that Qatar has improved its counter-terrorism efforts in past years, although it conceded that Qatar's monitoring and prosecution of terrorist financiers and charities has remained "inconsistent".

In 2014, Qatar introduced new laws for charities and cybercrime prevention. Since 2014, all projects and international bank transfers of Qatari charities need authorization by the government's independent Charities Commission, which controls charitable giving to prevent misuse of donations and terrorism financing.

The United States and Qatar have a strong partnership in combating terrorism, with Qatar being a key partner in the Global Coalition to Counter ISIL.

Qatar participated in the Department of State's Anti-terrorism Assistance program in 2015 and hosted the Global Counter terrorism Forum. In year 2015, Qatar hosted the UN Crime Congress and pledged funding to the UN Office on Drugs and Crime. Qatar's National Anti-Terrorism Committee (NATC) formulates policy, ensures transparency, and participates in conferences.The State Department also noted Qatar's maintenance of an active watch list of terrorist suspects, and stated that the country had made efforts to arraign prominent terrorist financiers. Furthermore, the report mentioned Qatar's restructuring of its National Anti-Terrorism Committee and recent enactment of counter-terrorism laws.

In October 2016, following a cyberattack attributed to the Russian cyber spying group Fancy Bear, one of the leaked Podesta emails from August 2014, addressed to John Podesta, accused Qatar and Saudi Arabia of providing "clandestine," "financial and logistic" aid to ISIL and other "radical Sunni groups." The email outlined a plan of action against ISIL, and urged putting pressure on Qatar and Saudi Arabia to end their alleged support for the group. Whether the email was originally written by Hillary Clinton, her advisor Sidney Blumenthal, another person, or the hackers is unclear.

Former US Defense Secretary Robert Gates stated in May 2017 that he doesn't "know instances in which Qatar aggressively goes after (terror finance) networks of Hamas, Taliban, Al-Qaeda."

In a press conference on June 9, 2017, US President Trump backed Saudi Arabia and its allies in their diplomatic spat with Qatar, stating that Qatar has historically been a funder of terrorism at a very high level, and encouraging the countries to continue their blockade. He contradicted secretary of state Rex Tillerson, who asked the quartet to moderate its blockade on Qatar as it was harming US operations against ISIL.

In July 2017, the US and Qatar signed a memorandum of understanding to combat the financing of terrorism, making Qatar the first country in the region to sign the executive program with the United States to fight terrorism financing.

In April 2018, US President Trump welcomed Sheikh Tamim Al Thani to the White House and described him as "big advocate" of combating terrorist financing. In November 2018, Qatar started to participate in a 3-year United States Department of State Anti-Terrorism Assistance (ATA) program.

In December 2020, the United Nations Office of Counter-Terrorism (UNOCT) in cooperation with Qatar established the International Hub on Behavioral Insights to Counter Terrorism as an UNOCT Programme Office in Doha. In June 2021, a second UNOCT Programme Office on Parliamentary Engagement in Preventing and Countering Terrorism was established.

In September 2021, the government of Qatar and the U.S. Office of Foreign Assets Control (OFAC) imposed sanctions against a major Hezbollah financial network based in the Arabian Peninsula.

Qatar is a member of the Middle East and North Africa Financial Action Task Force (MENAFATF), an associated body of the Financial Action Task Force.

== Activities of various groups in Qatar ==
=== Al-Qaeda ===
Jamal Ahmed al-Fadl, Osama bin Laden's former business agent, defected to the United States in 1996, and testified to the 9/11 Commission and Congress, that Bin Laden told him in 1993 that the Qatar Charitable Society (QCS), (later renamed Qatar Charity) was one of Bin Laden's several sources of funding.

In 2003, The New York Times wrote:

"Private support from prominent Qataris to Al Qaeda is a sensitive issue that is said to infuriate George J. Tenet, the director of central intelligence. After the Sept. 11 attacks, another senior Qaeda operative, Khalid Shaikh Mohammed, who may have been the principal planner of the assault on the World Trade Center and the Pentagon, was said by Saudi intelligence officials to have spent two weeks in late 2001 hiding in Qatar, with the help of prominent patrons, after he escaped from Kuwait."

Khalifa Muhammad Turki al-Subaiy and Abd al-Rahman bin Umayr al-Nuaymi are senior-level financiers of al-Qaeda. Al-Subaiy was a previous employee of the Qatar Central Bank. In 2014, U.S. Treasury Undersecretary for Terrorism and Financial Intelligence, David Cohen, announced that the two men were living freely in Qatar. Both men were on a worldwide terrorist blacklist. The two men were tried and acquitted; the "apparent reasons" for which, according to Sigurd Neubauer in The National Interest, were "tied to" Qatari intelligence being unable to demonstrate evidence without "compromising its intelligence gathering capabilities". In response to Cohen's announcement and the release of the U.S. intelligence report, reporters from The Telegraph contacted Qatari officials. According to the Telegraph, "Qatar has refused to answer".

At one time, Al-Nuaymi was the president of the Qatar Football Association. The U.S. report said that he sent more than 1.25 million British pounds per month to Al-Qaeda jihadist fighters in Iraq. He sent hundreds of thousands of pounds to fighters in Syria. The United States designated Al-Nuaymi as a terrorist in 2013. Britain sanctioned him in 2014.

Al-Nuaymi is knowingly associated with Abd al-Wahhab Muhammad 'Abd al-Rahman Al-Humayqani, a Specially Designated Global Terrorist (SDGT) whom the US Treasury sanctioned in 2013 for his role as fundraiser and executive for al-Qaeda in the Arabian Peninsula (AQAP). The US Treasury claimed that in 2012 Al-Nuaymi supported financially a charity directed by Humayqani. By exploiting his status in the charitable community, Humayqani allegedly raised funds and facilitated transfers from al-Qaeda supporters based in Saudi Arabia to Yemen. Reportedly Humayqani had high level connections with al-Qaeda top operatives and often acted as an AQAP representative while meeting with Yemeni authorities. On behalf of AQAP, he allegedly recruited individuals for several murderous attacks in Yemen, and personally directed a "group of armed AQAP associates that intended to carry out attacks on Yemeni government facilities and institutions, including a Yemeni government building in al-Bayda Governorate".

About ten months after being sanctioned by the U.S. Treasury, Nuaimi was also restrained from doing business in the UK. Al-Subaiy and Al-Nuaymi have close ties to senior leaders in the Qatari government. Robert Medick, a reporter for The Telegraph's "Stop the Funding of Terror" campaign, wrote in 2014 that Qatar "turned a blind eye to terrorist financiers operating within their midst".

According to the 9/11 Commission Report, Subayi also provided financial support to Khalid Sheikh Mohammed, a Pakistani al-Qaeda senior officer purported to be one of the architects of the 9/11 attacks.

On August 4, 2015 the US Treasury sanctioned Qatari citizen Abd al-Latif Bin Abdallah Salih Muhammad al-Kawari for his alleged support to al-Qaeda in Pakistan and Afghanistan. According to the Treasury's designation, al-Kawari had worked with al-Qaeda facilitators since the early 2000s in his role as financier and security official for the terrorist group. Al-Kawari is also reported to have worked with US and UN terrorist designated al-Qaeda affiliates Mustafa Hajji Muhammad Khan and Ibrahim Isa Haji Muhammad al-Bakr to have funds delivered to al-Qaeda operatives in Pakistan. In 2012, al-Kawari allegedly coordinated "the delivery of funding from Qatari financiers intended to support al-Qaida and to deliver receipts confirming that al-Qaida received foreign donor funding from Qatar-based extremists". He also provided assistance to an al-Qaeda courier who was transporting several thousands of dollars to al-Qaeda's officials.

Furthermore, Qatar Charity, Qatar's largest NGO, has played a key role in funneling financial support to al-Qaeda. Legal proceedings from the trial United States vs. Enaam M. Arnaout report that in 1993 Osama Bin Laden mentioned Qatar Charity as one of the preferred channels to funnel financial support to al-Qaeda operatives overseas. Former Qatar Charity employee and al-Qaeda defector al-Fadl confirmed the affiliation between al-Qaeda and the Qatari Charity. Al-Fadl declared to have personally cooperated with Qatar Charity's director in the late 1990s, Abdullah Mohammed Yusef, who was affiliated to al-Qaeda and also engaged in the National Islamic Front, a Sudanese political group that protected Osama Bin Laden. The Consortium Against Terrorist Finance reported that Qatar Charity also channeled funds to Chechnya-based al-Qaeda operatives in 1999, as well as to Ansar Dine in North Mali.

During the 2011 Libyan revolution that ousted Muammar Gaddafi, Qatar provided financial and material support amounting to "millions of dollars in aid, military training and more than 20,000 tons of weapons" to anti-Gaddafi rebels, which was channeled through few key figures, some of which tied to al-Qaeda. In particular, Abdelhakim Belhadj, a Libyan politician and military leader who directed the defunct, UN terrorist designated Libyan Islamic Fighting Group (LIFG) during the 2011 revolution, was among the Qatar-backed key players in Libya and the recipient of several Qatar-paid shipments. Several members of the group, which had tried to overthrow Gaddafi since 1994, had solid ties to al-Qaeda. Belhadj reportedly followed Bin Laden when he moved al-Qaeda headquarters in Sudan in 1996. Furthermore, the UN Security Council claimed that LIFG contributed to "the financing, planning, facilitating, preparing or perpetrating of acts or activities by, in conjunction with, under the name of, on behalf or in support of" al-Qaeda, its leader, and the Taliban.

=== Jabhat Al-Nusra ===
Qatar has sponsored al-Qaeda's affiliate in Syria, the al-Nusra Front, since 2013. The jihadist group, established within the framework of Abu Bakr al-Baghdadi's plans for an Islamic State in the Levant, has parted ways from ISIS in 2013 due to leadership conflicts. The group was designated as terrorist entity by the UN, the EU, Canada, the U.S., Israel, Hong Kong, Switzerland, and Australia. Nonetheless, Qatar has continuously supported it through ransom payments and fundraising campaigns as a strategic ally in Syria, committed to depose Syrian President Bashar al-Assad.

Qatar has acted as mediator for the release of prisoners held by al-Nusra on several occasions, most notably in the case of the 45 UN Fijian peacekeepers kidnapped in August 2014 and in the December 2015 prisoner swap between al-Nusra and the Lebanese government. Qatar has also paid conspicuous ransoms – ranging from few million to hundreds of million dollars- to return hostages kept by al-Nusra.

In addition to ransom payments, the Qatar government as well as Qatari citizens have sponsored large-scale fundraising campaigns to solicit "support for the procurement of weapons, food and supplies for al-Nusra in Syria" which have often relied on social media. "Madid Ahl al-Sham", a fundraising campaign launched in 2013 and shut down by Qatari authorities only in 2015, became "one of the preferred conduits for donations intended for the group".

In 2013 Madid Ahl al-Sham was expanded to collect weapons, as announced in a May 2013 Facebook posting. Several prominent figures, from Egyptian cleric Wagdy Ghoneim to wealthy Qatari Abdulaziz bin Khalifa al-Attiyah, overtly endorsed the campaign on their social media profiles. However, the success of the campaign was largely ascribed to its direct coordinators from 2013 to 2015, Sa'ad bin Sa'ad Mohammed Shariyan al-Ka'bi and Abd al-Latif Bin 'Abdullah Salih Muhammad al-Kuwari. Al-Ka'bi is a Qatari citizen designated by the US Treasury as a terrorist financier who also acted as an intermediary for collecting ransom for hostage exchange with al-Nusra in August 2015. Al-Kawari, another Qatar-based financier and lead actor in Madid Ahl al-Sham, was also designated by the US Treasury for collecting financial support for al-Qaeda and for his role as "an al-Qaida security official". U.S. officials also reported that al-Kuwari closely cooperated with Qatar-based Abdallah Ghanim Mafuz Muslim al-Khawar to "deliver money, messages and other material support to al-Qa'ida elements in Iran", who also facilitated jihadists to travel to Afghanistan. The Qatari government did not arrest the two terrorist financiers after the Treasury's designation, and they both continued to live with impunity in the country until 2015 when the Qatari government froze their assets and imposed travel bans on them.

=== ISIS ===
In November 2014, the U.S. Treasury Undersecretary for Terrorism and Financial Intelligence, David Cohen, described Qatar as operating an environment that is tolerant of terrorism financing.

U.S. counterterrorism officials have said that donations from countries outside the U.S. have been a traditional source of financing for terrorism. A small part of ISIS's financing operations comes from such donations.

Abdul Karim al-Thani, a member of Qatar's royal family, ran a safe house for Abu Musab al-Zarqawi, the founder of Al-Qaeda in Iraq, the predecessor to ISIS. Al-Thani gave Qatari passports out and put $1 million into a bank account to finance AQI.

More rumors about Qatar's alleged cooperation with ISIS affiliates surfaced in early 2015. On February 11, 2015 Sudan Tribune reported controversial statements by Yahia Sadam, an official of the Minni Minnawi Sudanese liberation movement who accused Qatar of endorsing the genocide perpetrated by Sudanese militiamen in Darfur by funneling money though the Sudanese branch of Qatar Charity, active in Darfur since 2010. Sadam claimed that Qatar Charity, which has purportedly signed a cooperation agreement with the Sudanese troops, was "building housing complexes in remote and isolated areas to harbor and train extremist groups". Those camps are believed to be hosting ISIS fighters, a concern voiced by attendees from the intelligence community at a March 2015 event at the United States Institute for Peace.

In February 2015, Egypt–Qatar relations deteriorated after the Egyptian Air Force conducted airstrikes on suspected ISIL positions in neighboring Libya following the beheading of 21 Egyptian Coptic Christians. The airstrikes were condemned by Al Jazeera, who broadcast images of civilian casualties. Additionally, Qatar's foreign ministry expressed reservations over the airstrikes. This prompted Tariq Adel, Egypt's Arab League delegate, to accuse Qatar of supporting terrorism. Egyptian citizens also launched an online campaign denouncing the Qatari government. The Gulf Cooperation Council rejected Egypt's accusations and its secretary general regarded the statements to be false. Shortly after, Qatar recalled its ambassador in Egypt for "consultations".

In 2017, the government of Qatar sentenced 25 ISIL sympathizers, most of them Qatari citizens, to life in prison, with a minimum term of 25 years.

=== Hamas ===
A minority of countries have designated Hamas in all its parts a terrorist organisation. These countries include Israel, the United States, Canada, the European Union, and Egypt. Some other countries designate only the Hamas military wing, the Izz ad-Din al-Qassam Brigades, a terrorist organisation. In December 2013, Egypt designated the Muslim Brotherhood a terrorist organization. Hamas, as an offshoot of the Muslim Brotherhood, was in February 2015 also declared a terrorist organization. In June 2015, an Egyptian appeals court overturned the designation.

In 2014, Qatar had pledged $400 million to Hamas to build two housing complexes, rehabilitate three main roads and create a prosthetic center, among other projects.

In September 2014, Congress held a hearing about the role of Turkey and Qatar in terrorist financing. Top Democrats and Republicans at the hearing gave tough words to Qatar. Congressman Ted Deutch (D-FL) said:

"Relationships with some of these countries are complicated . . . Support for Hamas is not complicated, and our response to their support for Hamas should not be complicated either."

Congressman Ted Poe (R-TX) said:

"We must make our message clear: If you help finance Hamas, there will be significant consequences and they will be unpleasant. I hope Qatar and Turkey are listening."

In 2014, former Prime Minister of Iraq Nouri al-Maliki stated that Qatar and Saudi Arabia started the civil wars in Iraq and Syria, and incited and encouraged terrorist movements, like Islamic State of Iraq and the Levant (ISIL) and al-Qaeda, supporting them politically and in the media, with money and by buying weapons for them.

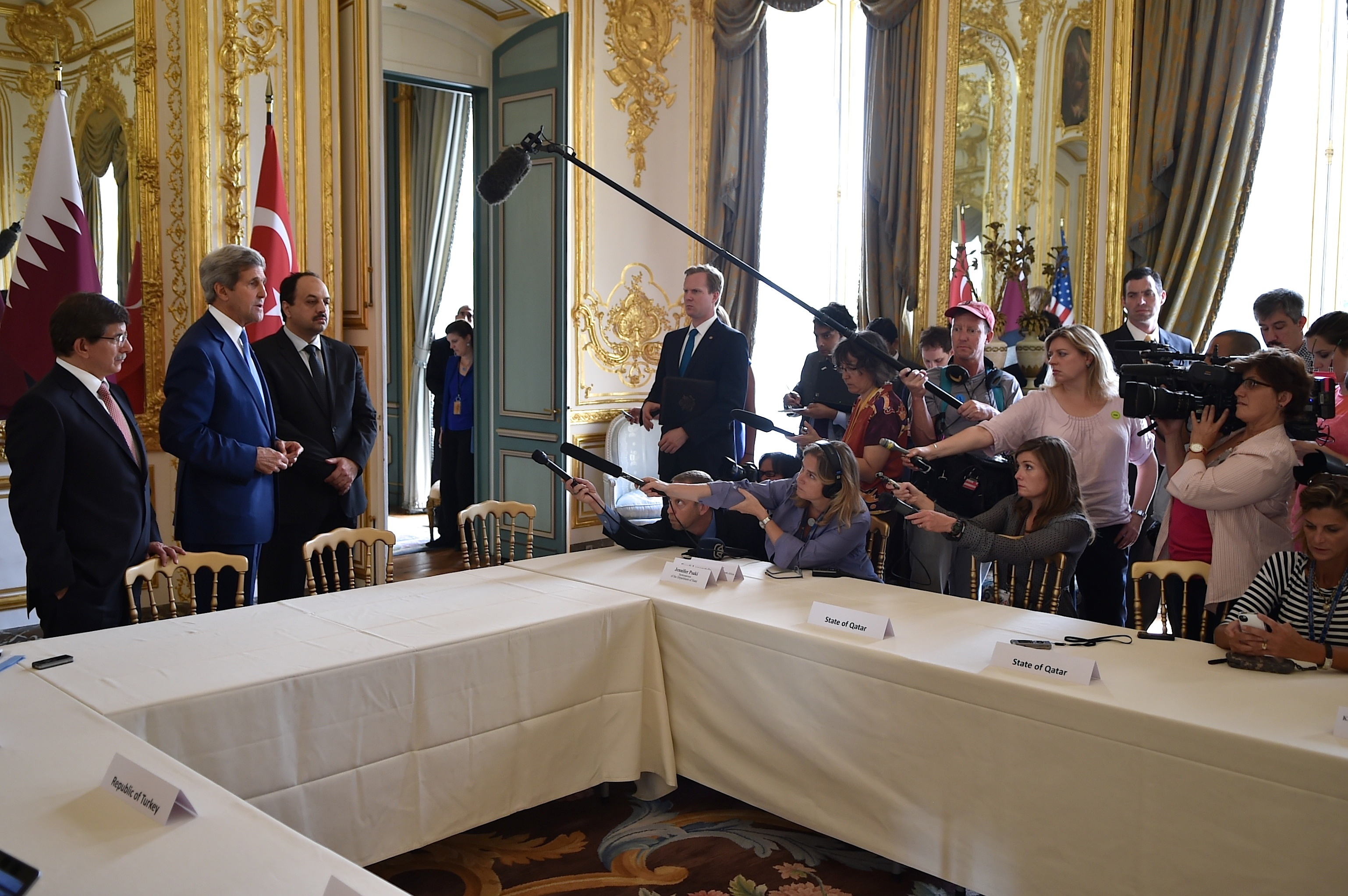
John Kerry standing with the Foreign Ministers of Turkey and Qatar during the 2014 Israel–Gaza conflict cease-fire negotiations

Qatar has continuously hosted Hamas politburo since 2012, when Khaled Mashal, Hamas' political leader, fled Syria for Qatar. However, Mashal had already found harbor in Qatar in the late 1990s, before he moved to Damascus in 2001. Over the past decades, Qatar has also offered shelter to several prominent Hamas affiliates: from Saleh al-Arouri, the founder of Hamas' military wing, Izz ad-Din al-Qassam Brigades, known for his ability to mastermind attacks from abroad who was reportedly hosted by Qatar after leaving Turkey in December 2015, to Husam Badran, the former leader of a Hamas cell and the current media spokesperson for Hamas who instigated several deadly suicide bombings during the Second Intifada and is based in Qatar since 2011. Along with Turkey, Qatar was one of only two countries that endorsed Hamas for ousting the Palestinian Authority from the Gaza Strip in 2007. Shortly after, Qatar publicly pledged $250 million in aid for Gaza, devastated after the Israeli war, and soon rose as a lead actor in the Palestinian conflict. The relation between the Gulf country and the group was reinforced especially between 2008 and 2009 after several expressions of mutual support, and especially after Qatar condemned the Gaza blockade.

Former Qatari Emir Hamad bin Khalifa al-Thani was the first head of state who visited Gaza after Hamas took power, in 2012. On that occasion, the Qatari ruler announced that Qatar would allocate $400 million for aid and reconstruction works. So far, Qatar has disbursed over $1 billion to the rebuilding efforts, thereby ranking as the biggest donor for the Gaza strip.

However, attempts to smuggle dual-use substances that could be used to produce explosives into Gaza have been detected and reported more and more frequently over the past years, and have raised concerns that foreign aid directed to the Gaza strip may be used by Qatar to finance Hamas. On the contrary, Qatar denies these allegations, stating that its policy is to help facilitate constructive engagement between Hamas and the Palestinian Authority.

In 2004, 2010, 2014, and 2017, the Qatari government introduced new anti-terror laws to combat terrorism, terrorism financing and related crimes. In 2019 the Qatari government introduced a new anti-money laundering and counter terror financing laws.

In July 2017, former CIA director David Petraeus revealed that Qatar has hosted the Hamas leadership at the request of US.

In 2025, Sheikh Hamad bin Jassim bin Jaber al-Thani (HBJ) was involved in a legal dispute with property investor Paddy McKillen, which led to public protests organized by pro-Israel groups accusing HBJ and Qatar of supporting Hamas. HBJ has consistently denied such accusations, asserting that his investments and business practices are legitimate and are not linked to terrorism. The protests, led by Rabbi Pini Dunner and funded by McKillen’s PR firm, were seen by some as part of an ongoing legal strategy rather than a reflection of HBJ’s actual affiliations or business conduct.

== Opposing views ==
At a September 2014 congressional hearing, Steven Cook of the Council on Foreign Relations testified, offering an alternative theory about Qatar's alleged lax enforcement against terrorism financing: self-interest. Cook argued that Qatar supports a wide variety of ideological groups in an effort to be independent from the influence of larger countries in the Middle East, such as Saudi Arabia.

In a September 2014 interview with CNN, the Emir of Qatar, Sheikh Tamim bin Hamad Al-Thani, said "We support all Palestinian people. We believe Hamas is a very important part of the Palestinian people." The Emir told CNN, "We don't fund extremists. If you talk about certain movements, especially in Syria and Iraq, we all consider them terrorist movement."

After Cohen made his public remarks in October 2014, the Qatar ambassador to the United States, Mohammed al-Kuwari, acknowledged to The Wall Street Journal that Qatar has had problems with some of its citizens sending money to terrorist organizations. However, al-Kuwari said that the Qatari government was never involved.

In 2004, the Qatari government created a Financial Intelligence Unit. In 2010, it created an anti-terrorism committee.

Furthermore, Qatar passed a law that implements regulations against charities that have been accused of sending money to terrorist organizations.

== 2017 diplomatic crisis ==
On May 27, 2017, Saudi Arabia, Egypt, Bahrain, the United Arab Emirates also known as the "Arab Quartet" and Yemen cut diplomatic ties with Qatar, accusing it of destabilizing the region and supporting terrorist groups. Saudi Arabia said it took the decision to cut diplomatic ties due to Qatar's "embrace of various terrorist and sectarian groups aimed at destabilizing the region", including the Muslim Brotherhood, al-Qaeda, Islamic State and groups supported by Iran in the kingdom's restive eastern province of Qatif where the vast majority of the population are Shia Muslims. According to CNN, Qatar had previously signed agreements with its neighbors, which were presented on the air, to stop funding several terrorist organizations.

=== Support and affiliation for radical terrorist organizations (Libya) ===
The diplomatic crisis extends to Qatar's involvements in advocating the releases of Internationally recognized terrorists such as Libya's Abdelhakim Belhadj, Leader of the Libyan Islamic Fighting Group – a terrorist organization, who was arrested by the CIA in 2004 in Malaysia, and involvement in the 2011 Libyan civil war, in which Qatar sent aid in the form of Weapons using Ali al-Sallabi ( Leader of the Muslim Brotherhood in Libya ) as a conduit for dispersal of the weapons for Islamists within Libya – specifically (Ansar Al Sharia) during the Libyan civil war which eventually helped with the downfall of Libya's Muammar Gaddafi. Supporting this claim, The Libyan National army spokesperson, Col.Ahmed Musmari accused Qatar of sponsoring terrorism by providing and arming Terrorists in Libya. According to the recent article published on Anadolu Agency, dated 27 October 2020, Qatar and Libya signed a memorandum of understanding in security cooperation to counter terrorism and organized crime. Emir of Qatar Sheikh Tamim bin Hamad Al-Thani held talks in Doha with Libyan delegation on the matter, according to the official QNA news agency. The talks with Libyan Foreign Minister Mohamed al-Taher Siala and Interior Minister Fathi Bashagha agreed on ways to build bilateral cooperation between Doha and Tripoli. Qatar is also the second largest contributor to the United Nations Trust Fund for Counter-Terrorism out of a total 35 other donors according to United Nations Office of Counter-Terrorism (UNOCT).

Alongside the list of people placed on the terrorist watchlist by the Arab nations and their Anti-Terror Quartet, Sadiq Al-Ghariani, the radical Salafi Imam of Libya and his TV channel Tannasoh, are also included in the list for incitement of violence and spreading radical Islamic propaganda. The list was extended with Salem Al-Jaber, Wanis Al-Mabrouk Al-Fasi, Salim Al-Sheikhi as other individuals.

=== End of crisis ===
On 4 January 2021, Qatar and Saudi Arabia agreed to resolution of the crisis brokered by Kuwait and United States. Saudi Arabia will reopen its border with Qatar and begin the process for reconciliation. An agreement and final communique signed on 5 January 2021 following a GCC summit at Al-'Ula marks the resolution of the crisis, with precise details to be released later.

== United States' position ==
On June 6, 2017, the US State Department said Qatar had made progress on stemming the funding of terrorists but that there was more work to be done. Prior to the crisis, President Donald Trump had made a trip to Saudi Arabia and met with Middle East leaders. Trump later said the leaders had all pointed to Qatar as the main funder of extremism. On June 7, 2017, Trump offered to mediate in the "crisis" and made a call to Qatar offering help.

In June 2017, the government of Qatar hired American attorney and politician John Ashcroft to represent the country in the wider international arena. His services include both lobbying and challenging international accusations following the regional blockade of Qatar by its neighbors. In addition, Ashcroft will be defending Qatar against U.S. president Donald Trump, who has commented on the country's evident proclivity towards funding terrorism and terrorist organizations.

According to The Washington Post, the United Arab Emirates planted false evidence before the crisis. According to CNN, the UAE officially denied those claims through its United States Embassy and its Foreign Affairs Minister Anwar Gargash.

On August 17, Saudi Arabia opened the land borders that connect Qatar with Saudi Arabia.

In July 2017, U.S. Secretary of State Rex Tillerson, praised Qatar after it became the first regional state to sign a memorandum of understanding with the U.S. to fight terrorist financing. Tillerson also commended Qatar, as it behaved reasonably throughout the dispute.

On October 19, 2019, Tillerson said in an interview that Saudi-led bloc is responsible for the continued crisis because their refusal to talk to Qatar so far. On October 30, U.S. Treasury Secretary Steven Mnuchin praised "strong ties" with Qatar, and vowed closer cooperation with the country. After a trip to many Middle East countries, the minister applauded Qatar's efforts in fighting terrorist financing, saying that the two countries will increase their cooperation in fighting terrorism.

In August 2020, the US State Department sent the Coordinator for Counterterrorism Nathan Sales to Doha to thank Qatar for their efforts against terrorism and to discuss Qatar’s role in combating the financing of terrorism, its new Anti-Money Laundering/Countering the Financing of Terrorism legislation and its participation in the Global Coalition to Defeat ISIS.

== Qatar's anti-terrorism legislation ==
The 2004 Law on Combating Terrorism contained far-reaching provisions defining and prosecuting terrorist activities in Qatar that are directed against the state. These included a prohibition on supplying information, training, weapons, financing, and material support for terrorists and terrorist organizations, as well as establishing, directing, or using legitimate entities, associations, or organizations to perpetrate terrorist activities. The law also criminalized cooperation with or membership in organizations or groups outside Qatar that commit a terrorist crime, including crimes not directed against the State of Qatar, and prohibits receiving military training from such organizations or groups located abroad.

In March 2007, Qatar established the National Counter Terrorism Committee (NCTC) at the Ministry of Interior. The NCTC publishes the national terrorist designation list.

The 2010 Combating Money Laundering and Terrorist Financing Law requires Qatar's public prosecutor's office to freeze the funds of individuals and organizations that are on the UN Security Council's terror sanctions list.

In 2017, the 2004 Law on Combating Terrorism was amended. The amendment included definitions of activities related to terrorism and terrorism financing, penalties for offenses related to terrorism and terrorism financing, and the creation of national designations lists. In addition, measures to monitor and restrict overseas activities of Qatari charities were significantly tightened. In 2019 the Qatari government introduced a new anti-money laundering and counter terror financing laws. These laws included rules on targeted financial sanctions and became effective in February 2020.

== See also ==
- Qatar counter-terrorism strategy
- Botroseya Church bombing in 2016 in Cairo
- Iran and state-sponsored terrorism
- Israel and state-sponsored terrorism
- List of charities accused of ties to terrorism
- Pakistan and state-sponsored terrorism
- State-sponsored terrorism
- Taliban activities in Qatar
- Terrorism and the Soviet Union
- United States and state-sponsored terrorism
- Assassination of Andrei Karlov in 2016 in Ankara

== Bibliography ==
- "Egypt court annuls ruling that Hamas is terrorist group" Archived 2015-06-09 at the Wayback Machine, Al Jazeera, June 6, 2015.
- "Egyptian court declares Hamas a 'terrorist’ group" Archived 2015-06-28 at the Wayback Machine, Al Jazeera, February 28, 2015.
- "Gaza Conflict Spotlights Role of Qatar, the Hamas-Funding U.S. Ally” Archived 2015-06-27 at the Wayback Machine, The Algemeiner, July 28, 2014.
- “Terrorist Groups: Hamas” Archived 2015-06-19 at the Wayback Machine, Counter Terrorism Guide, National Counterterrorism Center, Office of the Director of National Intelligence, U.S. Government.
- "Treasury Designates Al-Qa’ida Supporters in Qatar and Yemen” Archived 2015-07-11 at the Wayback Machine, United States Department of Treasury, December 18, 2013.
- Andrew Gilligan, for-terrorists.html "The 'Club Med for Terrorists'", The Telegraph, September 27, 2014.
- Jamie Dettmer, "U.S. Ally Qatar Shelters Jihadi Moneymen” Archived 2017-02-01 at the Wayback Machine, The Daily Beast, December 10, 2014.
- Jodi Rudoren, "Qatar’s Emir Visits Gaza, Pledging $400 Million to Hamas" Archived 2017-08-22 at the Wayback Machine, The New York Times, October 23, 2012.
- Jonathan Schanzer, "A Survey of Global Terrorism and Terrorist Financing", Hearing before the Task Force to Investigate Terrorist Financing, U.S. House Committee on Financial Services, April 22, 2015.
- Julian Pecquet, "Congress Goes After 'Frenemies' Turkey, Qatar” Archived 2017-08-10 at the Wayback Machine, U.S. News & World Report, September 10, 2014.
- Lori Plotkin Boghardt,"Qatar Is a U.S. Ally. They Also Knowingly Abet Terrorism. What's Going On?” Archived 2021-09-14 at the Wayback Machine, New Republic, October 6, 2014.
- Matthew Epstein & Evan Kohlmann, “Progress Since 9/11: The Effectiveness of U.S. Anti-Terrorist Financing Efforts”, Testimony before the U.S. House Committee on Financial Services Subcommittee on Oversight and Investigations, March 11, 2003.
- Mick Krever, "Qatar's Emir: We don't fund terrorists" Archived 2019-05-19 at the Wayback Machine, CNN, September 25, 2014.
- National Commission on Terrorist Attacks, The 9/11 Commission Report: Final Report of the National Commission on Terrorist Attacks upon the United States Archived 2021-10-26 at the Wayback Machine, (New York: W. W. Norton & Company, 2011), page 62.
- Patrick E. Tyler, "Intelligence Break Led U.S. to Tie Envoy Killing to Iraqi Qaeda Cell” Archived 2016-08-05 at the Wayback Machine, The New York Times, February 6, 2003.
- Pete Roskam and Brad Sherman, Letter to U.S. Treasury Secretary Jack Lew, U.S. Congress, December 10, 2014.
- Robert Mendick, "Terror financiers are living freely in Qatar, US discloses” Archived 2019-05-17 at the Wayback Machine, The Telegraph, November 16, 2014.
- United States District Court Northern District of Illinois Eastern Division, “Government's Evidentiary Proffer Supporting the Admissibility of Coconspirator Statements”, United States of America v. Enaam M. Arnaout, No. 02 CR 892.
- William Mauldin, "U.S. Calls Qatar, Kuwait Lax Over Terror Financing" Archived 2018-09-27 at the Wayback Machine, The Wall Street Journal, October 23, 2014.
