= Abu Salim Martyrs Brigade =

- Leader: Salim Derby †
- Dates active: 2011–2015
- Active regions: Derna
- Ideology: Islamism
- Part of: Shura Council of Mujahideen in Derna
- Wars: the Second Libyan Civil War

The Abu Salim Martyrs Brigade was an Islamist militia that advocated for the implementation of Sharia law within Derna, Libya. The group was known for enforcing strict social rules in the city.

== Background ==
The Abu Salim Martyrs Brigade was created by former Libyan Islamic Fighting Group member Abdel-Hakim al-Hasidi. Following the Libyan Civil War, the brigade was taken over by Salim Derby.

In 2014, the Islamic State (IS) in Libya took over much of Derna. Abu Salim and IS repeatedly clashed in the following months in disputes over power and resources. Derby was killed in fighting with IS militants in June 2015.

On 17th November 2015, 44 civilians were kidnapped from an unknown number of road blocks in Tripoli. The civilians were released in two groups of 27 a few hours apart from each other, the authorities attributed the abduction to the Abu Salim Martyrs Brigade.
