= Afghan War prisoner escapes =

During the 2001 Invasion of Afghanistan, many Taliban, al-Qaeda and militant fighters were captured and held at military bases in the region. On several occasions, there were instances of mass escapes.

== 2003 ==
On October 11, 2003, nearly 30 prisoners held near Kandahar managed to escape. Some reporters suggested they were actually released.

== 2005 ==
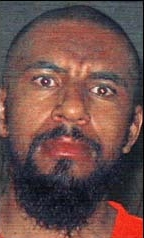
Abu Yahya al-Libi

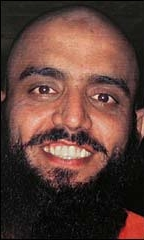
Muhammad Jafar Jamal al-Kahtani

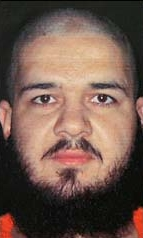
Abdullah Hashimi

In July 2005, Omar al-Faruq, the highest-ranked prisoner at the base and one of the highest-ranked al-Qaeda officers ever captured, escaped along with Libyan Abu Yahya al-Libi, Saudi Muhammad Jafar Jamal al-Kahtani and Syrian Abdullah Hashimi.

All four prisoners had been individually found guilty of various acts of belligerence, and thus assigned to "Cell 119" in the days before the escape, the only cell set apart from the rest – though obstructed from guards' view.

On the night of July 15, the prisoners were all accounted for at the 01:50 headcount. Then, they picked the lock of the cell, changed out of their prison uniforms, sneaked into the main camp area and crawled over a damaged wall and crossed a Soviet-era minefield to meet a getaway vehicle.

After their disappearance was noted at the 03:45 headcount, a massive manhunt, including the use of helicopters, was dispatched, though they didn't manage to find any of the escapees. A military police officer was initially suspected of aiding their escape, but was cleared.

Initial reports from the U.S. military gave different names for the escapees, and included a reference to Libyan Hasan Qayad, who had appeared in a video giving a sermon on the end of Ramadan 4 November 2005.

Pentagon spokesman Bryan Whitman spoke to the press stating that this "clearly wasn't the US military's finest hour".

On 18 October, Kahtani released a videotape in Pakistan, detailing the escape and pledging further attacks against Saudi Arabia and United States.

Al-Faruq was killed by British soldiers in Iraq in September 2006. Al-Kahtani was recaptured in Afghanistan in November 2006. Hashimi was killed in an airstrike in Afghanistan in July 2008. Al-Libi was killed in a drone strike in the North Waziristan region of Pakistan in June 2012. Consequently, all the escapees have since been captured or killed.
