= LIFG =

LIFG may refer to:

- Libyan Islamic Fighting Group, an armed Islamist group involved in the Libyan Civil War of 2014
- Left inferior frontal gyrus, a gyrus of the frontal lobe
