= Abdel Wahab Qaid =

Libyan politician and militia leader (born 1967 or 1968)

Abdel Wahab Mohamed Qaid

Member of the General National Congress of Libya
- Incumbent
- Assumed office 8 August 2012

Personal details
- Born: 1967 or 1968
- Party: Libyan Islamic Fighting Group (–2012); Umma Party (2012–present)
- Education: Al-Arab Medical University, Benghazi
- Website: Facebook page

Abdel Wahab Mohamed Qaid (Arabic: عبدالوهاب محمد قايد), alias Abu Idris al-Libi is a Libyan politician and former militia leader. Since 2012, he has been a member of the Libyan Parliament (General National Congress) and the head of the National Border Guard for southern Libya.

He was described as one of the most senior members of the Libyan Islamic Fighting Group that fought against the rule of Muammar Gaddafi. He was one of the last members of LIFG to be released from prison (on February 16, 2011) as part of the reconciliation program headed by the leader's son Saif al-Islam Gaddafi. He is the elder brother of Abu Yahya al-Libi, former number 2 in al-Qaeda, who was killed in a US drone strike in June 2012.

After the Libyan Civil War of 2011 that led to the deposition of Gaddafi, he was elected to the General National Congress as an independent, representing a constituency in Southern Libya. After the parliament was constituted, he founded the al-Wafa Bloc (full name: al-Wafa li dimaa Al-Shuhadaa, "Remaining Faithful to the Blood of the Martyrs"), made up of former anti-Gaddafi militia fighters. He advocates a rigorous exclusion of representatives of the disempowered Gaddafi regime from public offices ("Political Exclusion Law"). He chairs the parliamentary Committee for National Security. Qaid was considered a main contender for the office of President of the General National Congress after the first President Mohammed Magariaf retired from this office due to the exclusion law in May 2013. Unlike all other groups, the al-Wafa Bloc opposed a women's quota in the Constitutional Assembly elected in February 2014. In October 2013, Russian media reported that Bassem al-Hashemi Sol, spokesman of a "Libyan Tribal association", accused Qaid of being a high-ranking al-Qaeda member.
