= Sanabel =

Sanabel may refer to:

- Sanabal Charitable Committee, a charity front in the United Kingdom which raised money for the banned terrorist organization called the Libyan Islamic Fighting Group, which is aligned with al-Qaeda
- Sanabel TV, a former locally operated television station in the West Bank city of Nablus, shut down by Israeli authorities

== See also ==
- Sanibel, Florida, city in Florida
