= Abu Yahya al-Libi =

Member of al-Qaeda

- أبو يحيى الليبي
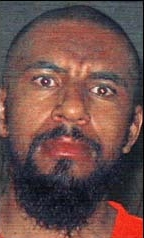
- Born: 1 January 1963; Marzaq, Libya
- Died: 4 June 2012 (aged 49); North Waziristan, Pakistan
- Title: Senior leader of Al-Qaeda
- Children: 3

Abu Yahya al-Libi (Arabic: أبو يحيى الليبي, audio; January 1, 1963, Marzaq – June 4, 2012), born Mohamed Hassan Qaid, was a terrorist and leading high-ranking official within al-Qaeda, and an alleged member of the Libyan Islamic Fighting Group.

He is believed to have been able to speak Urdu, Pashto and Arabic and to have used the aliases Hasan Qaiid (Hasan Qayad or Hassan Qayid), Yunis al-Sahrawi, and Hassan Qaed al-Far.

Al-Libi was a citizen of Libya, who was held in extrajudicial detention in the Bagram interim detention facility. At that time, American counter-terrorism analysts asserted that al-Libi was a member of al Qaeda. Al-Libi was one of several high-profile Bagram captives who escaped on the night of July 10, 2005.

Jarret Brachman, a former analyst for the Central Intelligence Agency (CIA), states of al-Libi:

He’s a warrior. He’s a poet. He’s a scholar. He’s a pundit. He’s a military commander. And he’s a very charismatic, young, brash rising star within Al-Qaeda, and I think he has become the heir apparent to Osama bin Laden in terms of taking over the entire global jihadist movement.

Scheuer states of him that he "in the last year or so emerged as al-Qaeda's theological hardliner" and an "insurgent-theologian". He was also an official on al-Qaeda's Shariah Committee.

He was the target of a US drone strike on June 4, 2012, in Mir Ali. His death was later confirmed by the al-Qaeda leader Ayman al-Zawahiri in a video released in September 2012 to coincide with the 9/11 anniversary.

== Background ==
The nisba patronymic of "al-Libi" suffixed to his name indicates that the bearer or his ancestors were from Libya. Al-Libi was born 1963, but Michael Scheuer stated there is little "information available about al-Libi beyond his record as an insurgent", His elder brother, Abd al-Wahhab Muhammad Qaid (Abu Idris al-Libi) is one of the most senior members of the Libyan Islamic Fighting Group and currently the head of the National Border Guard for southern Libya.

Al-Libi went to Afghanistan in the early 1990s and whilst bin Laden was an engineer and al-Zawahiri a doctor, al-Libi is said to have been an Islamic scholar who "spent two years in Africa studying Islam". It is believed that after going to Afghanistan in the 1990s, he "was sent back to northern Africa to study Islam in Mauritania."

As detailed below, he was imprisoned by both Pakistani and U.S. authorities. He claimed to have studied Islamic law, history and jurisprudence "for years among excellent and great scholars" who were in the field with al-Qaeda and other Islamist insurgent groups.

It is stated that "When he returned two years later" [from his Islamic studies in Mauritania, Africa], "Afghanistan was no longer a battleground for militant Libyans, but rather a haven: the Taliban controlled most of the country. Mr. Libi's training in warfare was minimal, and his early work as a preacher rarely touched on militant action, according to the Libyan man who said he had met Mr. Libi in Afghanistan, and who spoke on condition of anonymity out of security concerns. "He started to visit training camps and talk about Shariah," or Islamic law, this man said in a telephone interview, about "morals, etiquette, how to act."

== Capture and escape ==
Al-Libi was a citizen of Libya, who was captured by ISAF forces in the Invasion of Afghanistan, a year after 9/11 (Pakistani authorities and turned over to American authorities, who eventually put him in the Bagram prison.) and was held in extrajudicial detention in the Bagram interim detention facility. American counter-terrorism analysts assert that al-Libi was a member of al Qaeda.

Al-Libi was one of several high-profile Bagram captives who escaped on the night of July 10, 2005. Early reports on the 2005 escape from Bagram Airbase included al-Libi's name as one of the escapees. Posters around the airbase identified "the Libyan, Mohammad Hassan Abu Bakar" as one of the escapees, but did not mention high-ranking al-Qaeda leader Omar al-Faruq as one of the escapees. Later reports removed the Libyan from the list of escapes and inserted al-Faruq.

On November 4, 2005, al-Libi appeared in a Ramadan video on the Arabic television station al-Arabiya, and mentioned that he had escaped from Bagram.

He was re-listed as an escapee, and as of October 2006 was listed among the Department of Defense's "Most Wanted", and a Terrorist Recognition Card repeated the earlier claim that he was indeed among the four escapees. In addition, the name off the Airbase posters was added as an "alias".

== Activities ==
Al-Libi produced a series of propaganda videos. On May 30, 2007, a 45-minute video, starring al-Libi came to light.

On June 22, 2008, Abu Yahia Al Libi released a 19-minute video urging Somalis to resist United Nations forces in Somalia.

Bryant Neal Vinas, an American, took part in 2008 with other masked fighters in an al-Qaeda propaganda video featuring al Libi. Vinas was captured in November 2008, and pleaded guilty in January to conspiracy to murder and to receiving military training from Al Qaeda murder and providing them with material support.

Al-Libi also appeared in a July 2009 video from al-Sahab entitled, "Swat: Victory or Martyrdom," about the Pakistani military's campaign against Pashtun militias and jihadi groups in the Swat Valley. On March 12, 2011, al-Libi urged his countrymen to overthrow Muammar Gaddafi's regime and establish Islamic rule, expanding the terror network's attempts to capitalize on the wave of unrest sweeping the region. That was put on in a video posted on a militant website.

TIP's "Islamic Turkistan" magazine in its 5th edition published an article by Al Qaeda member Abu Yayha al Libi who wrote in support of "Turkistan".

Al-Qaeda member Abu Yahya al-Libi spoke in support of "Jihad" in "East Turkestan" against China.

== Video releases ==
- Dec 16, 2005 – Names and Information of Twelve Detainees in Bagram Prison in Afghanistan from Sheikh Abu Yehia al-Libi SITE Intel Group: SITE Publications - Names and Information of Twelve Detainees in Bagram Prison in Afghanistan from Sheikh Abu Yehia al-Libi
- Dec 21, 2005 – Eid al-Fitr Sermon 2005 Eid al-Fitr Sermon by Abu Yehia al-Libi and Scene of Mujahideen Training Exercises SITE Intel Group: SITE Publications - Eid al-Fitr Sermon by Abu Yehia al-Libi and Scene of Mujahideen Training Exercises
- Dec 21, 2005 – A Letter to Abu Musab al-Zarqaw from Abu Yehia al-Libi SITE Intel Group: SITE Publications - A Letter to Abu Musab al-Zarqaw from Abu Yehia al-Libi
- Dec 27, 2005 – Jihad or Resistance – An Examination of the Exchanging Terms from Islamic Law for Secular, Western Terms by Abu Yehia al-Libi SITE Intel Group: SITE Publications - Jihad or Resistance – An Examination of the Exchanging Terms from Islamic Law for Secular, Western Terms by Abu Yehia al-Libi
- Mar 7, 2006 – A Discussion Concerning the Facts and Claims of Extremism Within Islam by Abu Yehia al-Libi SITE Intel Group: SITE Publications - A Discussion Concerning the Facts and Claims of Extremism Within Islam by Abu Yehia al-Libi
- Apr 17, 2006 – Hamas and the Impending Exposure by Abu Yehia al-Libi SITE Intel Group: SITE Publications - Hamas and the Impending Exposure by Abu Yehia al-Libi
- May 9, 2006 – SITE Intel Group: SITE Publications - An Interview by Tora Bora Magazine with Abu Yehia al-Libi
- Abu Yahya al-Libi on May 11, 2006 SITE Intel Group: SITE Publications - And Those Who Annoy Allah’s Messenger Will Have a Painful Torment – A Speech from Abu Yehia al-Libi from as-Sahab Productions
- Abu Yahya al-Libi on Jun 17, 2006 (English Subtitles)
- June 2005 – As-Sahab Interview with Abu Yahya al-Libi SITE Intel Group: SITE Publications - An Interview with Abu Yehia al-Libi, an Escapee from Bagram Prison in Afghanistan, Conducted and Issues by as-Sahab Productions
- Light & Fire in Eulogizing the Martyr Abu Musab al-Zarqawi (English Subtitles)
- Jul 26, 2006 – Labik Video Production: “They Are Coming,” of Mujahideen Training Exercises in Afghanistan and Speeches from Abu Yehia al-Libi SITE Intel Group: SITE Publications - Labik Video Production: “They Are Coming,” of Mujahideen Training Exercises in Afghanistan and Speeches from Abu Yehia al-Libi
- Jul 31, 2006 – As-Sahab Video Eulogy from Abu Yehia al-Libi for Abu Musab al-Zarqawi SITE Intel Group: SITE Publications - As-Sahab Video Eulogy from Abu Yehia al-Libi for Abu Musab al-Zarqawi
- Jihadi Poems
- Combat, Not Compromise (English Subtitles) transcript
- Oct 27, 2006 – “The Infidel Karzai Regime and the Necessity of War” SITE Intel Group: SITE Publications - “The Infidel Karzai Regime and the Necessity of War” by Abu Yehia al-Libi
- Nov 2, 2006 – Abu Yahya al-Libi Video Eulogy for Faruq al-Iraqi Produced by as-Sahab SITE Intel Group: SITE Publications - Abu Yahya al-Libi Video Eulogy for Faruq al-Iraqi Produced by as-Sahab
- Dec 26, 2006 – Our Battle Between Intensity [of the Past] and the Caution of Tomorrow SITE Intel Group: SITE Publications - “Our Battle Between Intensity [of the Past] and the Caution of Tomorrow” - Written by Abu Yahya al-Libi
- Feb 1, 2007 – And the Crusade Continues... The AIDs Children in Libya (English Subtitles) SITE Intel Group: SITE Publications - “The Crusade Continues: The Children of AIDS in Libya” – A Video Speech from Abu Yahya al-Libi, Produced by as-Sahab
- Feb 12, 2007 – Labik Productions Presents Selected Pictures of a Shari’a Course Led by Abu Yahya al-Libi in a Mujahideen Training Center SITE Intel Group: SITE Publications - Labik Productions Presents Selected Pictures of a Shari’a Course Led by Abu Yahya al-Libi in a Mujahideen Training Center
- Feb 8, 2007 – The Adha Holiday Sermon 1427H
- Mar 22, 2007 – Iraq: Between Indications of Victory and Conspiratorial Intrigues (English Subtitles) SITE Intel Group: SITE Publications - Abu Yahya al-Libi Video Speech, “Iraq: Between Indications of Victory and Conspiratorial Intrigues”
- Mar 25, 2007 – To the Army of Difficulty in Somalia (English Subtitles) SITE Intel Group: SITE Publications - “To the Army of Difficulty in Somalia” – A Video Speech by Abu Yahya al-Libi from as-Sahab
- Apr 30, 2007 – Palestine, an Alarming Scream and a Warning Cry SITE Intel Group: SITE Publications - “Palestine is a Cry of Warning” – A Video Speech by Abu Yahya al-Libi from as-Sahab, 4/2007
- May 30, 2007 – The Tawheed of Saud... and the True Tawheed (English Subtitles) SITE Intel Group: SITE Publications - “The Tawheed of Al Saud…and the True Tawheed” – A Speech by Abu Yahya al-Libi Produced by as-Sahab Media
- Jun 6, 2007 – Eulogy for Mullah Dadullah (Eulogy for Taliban Commander Mullah Dadullah)SITE Intel Group: SITE Publications - Abu Yahya al-Libi Delivers Eulogy for Taliban Commander Mullah Dadullah in Video Produced by as-Sahab Media
- Jul 31, 2007 – The Masters of the Martyrs (Of the Masters of Martyrs) SITE Intel Group: SITE Publications - “Of the Masters of Martyrs” – A Video Speech by Abu Yahya al-Libi Produced by as-Sahab Media
- Sep 9, 2007 – Dots on the Letters (English Subtitles) [As-Sahab Second Interview with Shaykh abu Yahia Al-Libi] SITE Intel Group: SITE Publications - “Dots on the Letters” – Second Interview with Abu Yahya al-Libi Conducted by As-Sahab Media – 9/2007
- Nov 7, 2007 – The Closing Statement for the Religious Training that was Held at One of the Mujahideen Centers (Final Session of the Shari’a Course Held at a Mujahideen Center). The transcript of this speech is titled 'Balancing Between Jihad and Seeking Knowledge'. Transcript (Apr 19, 2008 – [Eid al-Adha 1428]). video and transcript links, SITE Intel Group on speech
- Going Forth – Nafeer (Go Forth) Khutbah video more links
- The Companion
- Dec 18, 2007 – Trumpet of War – VideoSITE Intel Group: SITE Publications - Abu Yahya Al-Libi Calls Muslims to Arms and Jihad in Video from As-Sahab
- Jan 8, 2007 – The Fire of the Magi in the Arabian Peninsula SITE Intel Group: SITE Publications - “The Fire of the Magi in the Arabian Peninsula” by Abu Yahya al-Libi
- January 20, 2008
- Feb 11, 2008 – Selected Notifications Of Jihad – Transcript
- March 3, 2008 – “Companion of the Path”, Abu Yahya Al-Libi Delivers Eulogy for Abu Laith Al-Libi
- March 10, 2008 – I am Not a Deceiver, Nor Will I Allow Someone to Deceive Me Site institute on speech
- May 22, 2008 – Abu Yahya al-Libi Derides Moderation of Islam SITE Intel Group: SITE Publications - Abu Yahya al-Libi Derides Moderation of Islam
- June 23, 2008 – Somalia – No Peace without Islaam UK News article, video part 1, part 2, video discussion, SITE Intel Group on speech

== Previous reports of death ==
It was reported by Pakistani sources on December 11, 2009, that Abu Yahya al-Libi was killed in a U.S. Drone strike in Pakistan; however, later reports identified the man killed as Saleh al-Somali.

== Death ==
On June 5, 2012, U.S. officials confirmed that Libi was among 15 militants killed the previous day when a US drone fired four missiles at a compound in Mir Ali, North Waziristan. Additionally, The White House later confirmed it. His death was later confirmed by al-Qaeda leader Ayman al-Zawahiri in a video released in September 2012 to coincide with the 9/11 anniversary.

== See also ==
- Adam Yahiye Gadahn
- Osama bin Laden
- Ayman al-Zawahiri
