= Michael Waddington =

American lawyer

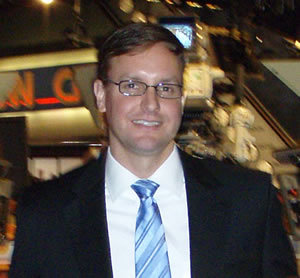
- Born: New Castle, Pennsylvania, U.S.
- Other name: Michael Stewart Waddington
- Education: Duquesne University (BA); Temple University Beasley School of Law (JD)
- Occupation: Criminal defense lawyer
- Spouse: Alexandra Gonzalez-Waddington
- Children: 2
- Website: www.ucmjdefense.com

Michael (Stewart) Waddington is an American criminal defense lawyer specializing in court-martial cases, war crimes, and other serious felonies. He defended Sgt. Alan Driver, accused of abusing detainees, and Specialist Hunsaker in the Operation Iron Triangle Case.

== Education ==
Waddington completed his B.A. degree in History at Duquesne University in 1997, and his J.D. degree from the Temple University James E. Beasley School of Law in 2000.

== Career ==
After graduating from law school, Waddington worked as a US Army JAG Corps Officer between 2001 and 2005, specializing in war crimes and other military-related cases. In 2006 he, along with his wife, launched a law firm, Gonzalez & Waddington, LLC, in Miami, Florida.

Among the clients that Waddington has represented are Sgt. Alan Driver, accused of abusing detainees during the war on terror campaign and Specialist Hunsaker in the Operation Iron Triangle case.

Several of Waddington's cases have been the subject of documentaries and films, including the documentary, Taxi to the Dark Side (2007), and Redacted (2007).

Waddington appeared in the 2009 CNN documentary Killings at the Canal and also contributed to the books The State of Criminal Justice from 2013 to 2022, an annual publication of the American Bar Association. He is the author of The Art of Trial Warfare, Battlemind: A Military Legal Thriller, Kick-Ass Closings, and multiple books on cross-examination, trial strategy, and military law.

=== Notable cases ===
==== Bagram prisoner abuse ====
In February 2006, while an Army Captain, Waddington defended Sergeant Alan Driver at Fort Bliss, Texas. Driver was court martialed for allegedly abusing detainees captured in the war on terror campaign, and held at the Bagram Air Base, Afghanistan, in 2002. Driver was charged with beating a Taliban commander called Habibullah, who later succumbed to injuries. He was also accused of throwing a shackled and handcuffed prisoner, Omar al-Faruq, against a wall. After the public confession of the disappearance of al-Faruq, Sgt Driver was fully acquitted of all charges. The Bagram Abuse Cases were the subject of the documentary, Taxi to the Dark Side (2007), which won an Academy Award in 2007 for the "Best Documentary Film."

==== Operation Iron Triangle ====
In June 2006, Waddington was called on to defend SPC William B. Hunsaker at Fort Campbell, Kentucky, in the case of a triple murder. Hunsaker was one of four soldiers belonging to the 101st Airborne Division who were accused of executing suspected al-Qaeda insurgents that were captured during a raid near Samarra, Iraq, on May 9, 2006. SPC Hunsaker and PFC Corey Clagett, another defendant, entered plea deals that reduced their maximum sentence to 18 years. Referred to as the Operation Iron Triangle case, this case became the subject of the 2008 book, Rules of Engagement? A Social Anatomy of an American War Crime – Operation Iron Triangle, Iraq by Stjepan Gabriel Meštrović.

==== Allegation of murder by U.S. Soldiers ====
Waddington served in the defense of Sgt. Anthony W. Yribe, a U.S. Army soldier implicated in the alleged rape and mass murder in Iraq.

==== Detainee abuse in Iraq ====
In February 2007, Waddington was called to defend Army Sergeant, SFC Timothy Drake, of allegations of using a baseball bat to beat enemy insurgents captured during the Battle of Fallujah, Iraq, in 2003. Drake was acquitted of aggravated assault with a bat, obstruction of justice, solicitation, and assault by kicking. He was convicted of misdemeanor, battery and making false statements. He was sentenced to a reprimand, and was retained on active duty.

==== Murder allegations in Kirkuk, Iraq ====
In July 2007, Waddington was called to defend Spc. Christopher P. Shore against a charge of murder under UCMJ art. 118(3). The charges stemmed from a June 23, 2007 raid near Kirkuk, Iraq, where Shore's platoon of elite army scouts conducted a night-time raid into enemy territory. Shore was charged with shooting a detainee after his platoon leader, SFC Trey A. Corrales, shot him with an M-4 rifle. Spc. Shore was acquitted of murder and convicted of discharging his weapon near the detainee (assault). He was sentenced to 120 days in jail, a reprimand, a two rank reduction, and no discharge. On May 21, 2008, Bednarek reduced Shore's conviction to simple assault, erasing Shore's felony record.

==== Rape allegation at the Naval Academy ====
In March 2008, Waddington was called to defend a third year United States Naval Academy Midshipman, Mark Calvanico, who was accused of breaking into the room of a fellow midshipman and raping her. On June 3, 2008, Naval Academy Superintendent Vice Adm. Jeffrey Fowler dismissed all court martial charges against the midshipman.

==== Execution of Iraqi snipers ====
In August 2008, Waddington defended an Army infantryman, SFC Joseph Mayo, who was accused of executing four Iraqi snipers that were caught in Baghdad. Multiple soldiers from the unit were charged in connection with the alleged shooting. In March 2009, SFC Mayo pleaded guilty, indicating that he did it "in the best interests of my soldiers", and was sentenced to 35 years.

==== Maywand District murders ====
Waddington represented Spc. Jeremy Morlock, one of five soldiers charged with the Maywand District murders, premeditated murder of three Afghan civilians, in 2010. Morlock faced a maximum sentence of life imprisonment. Morlock later pleaded guilty to three counts of murder, one count of conspiracy to commit assault and battery, and one count of illegal drug use in exchange for a maximum sentence of 24 years.

==== Colombian prostitution scandal ====
Waddington defended a US Special Forces soldier who was one of several people accused of being involved in hotel misconduct and a prostitution scandal in Colombia in April 2012. The charges against the men included heavy drinking to soliciting prostitutes, two days before President Barack Obama arrived for the Summit of the Americas. Three of the implicated were cleared of serious misconduct charges, with four others, including Secret Service supervisor David Chaney, being forced out.

==== Navy SEAL Double Rape Trial ====
In the March 2018, Waddington defended a US Navy SEAL officer stationed at Coronado Navy Base, CA, who was accused of sexually assaulting two women in San Diego, CA. The Navy SEAL was acquitted of all charges by a Navy jury.

==== Navy SEAL Team 6 Catfishing Scandal ====
In the summer of 2019, Waddington defended a member of SEAL Team 6 accused of being involved in a catfishing scandal.

==== Green Beret Colonel Rape Allegation ====
In August 2020, Waddington successfully defended an Army Special Forces Colonel accused of raping a woman affiliated with the US Embassy in Pakistan. The jury trial took place at Fort Bragg, NC, in August 2020.

=== Books Published ===
Waddington had written multiple books, including non-fiction and fictional works, including:

==== Battlemind ====
Battlemind: A Military Legal Thriller

==== Kick-Ass Closings ====
Kick-Ass Closings: A Guide to Giving the Best Closing Argument of Your Life

==== The Art of Trial Warfare ====
The Art of Trial Warfare: Winning at Trial Using Sun Tzu's The Art of War

==== Pattern Cross-Examination for DNA and Biological Evidence ====
Pattern Cross-Examination for DNA and Biological Evidence: A Trial Strategy & Resource Guide

==== Pattern Cross-Examination for Forensic Experts ====
Pattern Cross-Examination for Forensic Experts: A Trial Strategy & Resource Guide

==== Pattern Cross-Examination for Sexual Assault Cases ====
Pattern Cross-Examination for Sexual Assault Cases: A Trial Strategy & Resource Guide

==== Trial Warrior’s Book of Wisdom ====
Trial Warrior’s Book of Wisdom: A Compilation of Quotes for Success in Law and Life

==== Google+ for Lawyers ====
Google+ for Lawyers: A Step by Step User's Guide

==== Upgrade Your Army Discharge ====
Upgrade Your Army Discharge

==== The State of Criminal Justice: 2013-2022 ====
From 2013 to 2023, Waddington wrote eleven chapters in the American Bar Association's annual books, The State of Criminal Justice. The chapters involved the Uniform Code of Military Justice (UCMJ), sexual assault in the military, and military law. The three most recent publications are:

==== The State of Criminal Justice 2022 ====
The State of Criminal Justice 2022 - Overview of UCMJ Changes in the National Defense Authorization Act for Fiscal Year 2022

==== The State of Criminal Justice 2021 ====
The State of Criminal Justice 2021 - Military Justice Act of 2016's Expansion of Military Subpoena Power

==== The State of Criminal Justice 2020 ====
The State of Criminal Justice 2020 - Changes to the Punitive Articles Under the Military Justice Act of 2016

==== Dare to Succeed ====
Waddington was one of the co-authors of the 2013 book, Dare to Succeed: The World's Leading Experts Reveal Their Secrets to Success in Business and in Life – and Dare You to Succeed.

=== Speaking Engagements ===
Waddington has lectured at multiple national legal conferences and universities on the topics of cross-examination, closing arguments, trial strategy, war crimes, military law, and The Art of Trial Warfare.

=== Television consultation ===
Waddington has provided consultation services to several television channels including CBS for its legal and political drama, The Good Wife.

== Personal life ==
Waddington resides in Miami, Florida, with his wife and law partner, Alexandra Gonzalez.
