= Homeland Party (Libya) =

Political party in Libya

Homeland Party حزب الوطن Ħizb al-Waṭan
- Founder: Ali al-Sallabi
- Founded: November 2011
- Ideology: Islamism; Islamic democracy; Conservatism
- International affiliation: Muslim Brotherhood

Website
- wattan.ly

The Homeland Party or Libyan National Party (also styled Alwattan Party, Arabic: حزب الوطن Ħizb al-Waṭan or Ħizb el-Waṭan) is a conservative Islamist political party in Libya, founded in November 2011, after the Libyan Civil War and the overthrow of the Libyan Arab Jamahiriya. It is endorsed and led by Ali al-Sallabi, an influential Salafist cleric. Members include Abdelhakim Belhadj, Mahmoud Hamza, Ali Zeidan and Mansour Saif Al-Nasar. At the time of its establishment, it had the provisional name of National Gathering for Freedom, Justice and Development.

Al-Sallabi has strong ties to both Yusuf al-Qaradawi, spiritual leader of the international Muslim Brotherhood, and Abdelhakim Belhadj, former "emir" of the Libyan Islamic Fighting Group. The party calls for "moderate" Islamic democracy, but demands to base a new Libyan constitution on Sharia law.

The Arabic word waṭan can be translated as "nation" or "homeland". The party claims to have offices in 27 Libyan cities. The party won no seats in the Libyan General National Congress election of 2012.

== See also ==
- List of Islamic political parties
- Justice and Development Party, a rival Islamist Libyan party.
