= Muhammad Jafar Jamal al-Kahtani =

Saudi Arabian held at Bagram prison

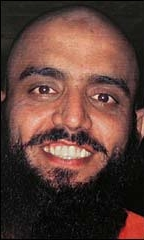
- Born: 1973; Saudi Arabia
- Released: escaped from Bagram on 2005-07-11
- Detained at: Bagram Theater Internment Facility
- Charge: extrajudicial detention

Muhammad Jafar Jamal al-Kahtani (born 1973) is a citizen of Saudi Arabia who was a captive held in extrajudicial detention in the United States' Bagram Theater Internment Facility. He has been described as one of the four men responsible for an escape from Bagram, on July 11, 2005. According to Eric Schmitt and Tim Golden of the New York Times, US officials didn't first identify him and Omar al Farouq under their real names, when they first escaped.

Schmitt and Golden reported "Intelligence officials gave differing views on the importance of Mr. Kahtani. One official described him as having been responsible at one point for maintaining Al Qaeda's operational support structure in Afghanistan; another said he was an important Qaeda fighter, but not a senior-level operative."

Al-Kaktani and the other three men were being held in Cell 119, Bagram, an isolation cell, with four other men. Schmitt and Golden reported that it had been planned to transfer the four men to the Guantanamo Bay detention camps in Cuba.

Al-Kahtani appeared in a video released by al Qaeda later in 2005. Radio Free Europe reported that Al-Kahtani appeared in an al Qaeda video with the other escaped men in October 2005.

American officials issued a statement on November 6, 2006 that a ""known al Qaeda operative and five other extremists" had been captured in an operation in Khost Province. On November 13, 2006, Asharq Alawsat reported that one of the captured men was a Saudi identified as "Abu Nasir al-Qahtani", who was later reported to be Muhammad Jafar Jamal al-Kahtani. Xinhua reported that the men were captured with "grenades, military equipment, armor-piercing rounds and AK-47 assault rifles" and a "camera containing surveillance video of nearby military installations". A Taliban spokesman told the News International that al-Kahtani was captured in a safe house near the Khost Airport.

Al-Kahtani was extradited to Saudi Arabia on April 29, 2007.
