= Atiyyatullah al-Libi =

Libyan member of al-Qaeda (1969–2011)

- عطية الله الليبي
- Attiyatullah in 2011
- Born: 1969; Misrata, Libya
- Died: 22 August 2011 (aged 41–42); North Waziristan, Pakistan

Jamal Ibrahim Ashtiwi al-Misrati (Arabic: جمال إبراهيم أشتيوي المصراتي; 1969 – August 22, 2011), better known as Atiyyatullah al-Libi (Arabic: عطية الله الليبي), was a Libyan militant who served as a senior leader and operational chief of al-Qaeda, as well as a prominent member of the Libyan Islamic Fighting Group. After his death he was described in Foreign Policy as a renaissance man for "combining both strategic and ideological savvy".

== Early life ==
Atiyyatullah al-Libi was born in Misrata, Libya in 1969. In 1988, he had volunteered to travel to Afghanistan to fight against its Soviet occupiers in the 1980s, while he was still a teenager. During his time in Afghanistan, he met and pledged allegiance to Osama bin Laden. Bin Laden mentored him directly, using him as an emissary and scholar. During this period, he also trained extensively in explosives, guerrilla tactics, and Islamic jurisprudence.

In the mid-1990s, al-Qaeda sent him to Algeria as an official envoy to the Armed Islamic Group (GIA) during the Algerian Civil War. However, the GIA leadership grew suspicious of him, holding him captive for five months and threatening to execute him. He eventually escaped captivity alongside several other prisoners.

The Washington Post reported that another prominent Libyan exile, Noman Benotman, was sent to Algeria in the 1990s to serve as an envoy to a group they said was then known as the Armed Islamic Group (GIA). He told The Washington Post that the GIA was suspicious of him, held him captive for months, and were considering killing him. He escaped with other captives, after five months of captivity, and, according to Benotman, "He had a very bad experience, and I think is still having nightmares about it." About the massacres that were committed during the Algerian Civil War, Atiyah says: "There are those who [...] say [...] the officers did that, France [did that]; etc. We are just covering up [the truth to exonerate] the people of Islam, [but] all these massacres occurred in the last days of Zitouni and days of Antar Zouabri. All of them [were committed by] the Armed Islamic Group".

== Return to al-Qaeda ==
Following the 2001 U.S. invasion of Afghanistan, al-Libi relocated to Iran, where he acted as a main liaison between al-Qaeda's central command and other regional militant groups. In December 2005, al-Libi wrote a stern letter to Abu Musab al-Zarqawi, the leader of al-Qaeda in Iraq. In the letter, he admonished Zarqawi for his excessive violence against Shiite civilians and urged him to align his actions with the broader political strategy of al-Qaeda's senior leadership.

== Death ==
He was assassinated in Pakistan by a CIA predator drone strike on August 22, 2011. At least eleven others were killed in the strike. He was previously reported dead in October 2010. His death was formally confirmed by al-Qaeda leader Ayman al-Zawahiri in a video released on December 1, 2011.

The State Department's Rewards for Justice offered up to US$1 million for information about him. However, he was removed from the list after he was killed.

Al-Qaeda leader Atiyyatullah Al-Libi's advice was published in the Turkistan Islamic Party's magazine Islamic Turkistan. Issue 19 of Islamic Turkistan cited and reprinted Al Qaeda member Atiyatallah al Libi's (عطية الله الليبي) Book of "Complete Works (كتاب الأعمال الكاملة) page 818, where he called India, Thailand, Philippines, Singapore, East Turkestan, the Caucasus, Balkans, Central Asia, Southern Europe and Al Andalus as "occupied Muslim lands" by the "infidels hand" and "infidel governments", naming America as the "original infidel" enemy, and called for them to be all reconquered by the Muslims through jihad. Ahmed Refai Taha and Atiyah Abd al-Rahman were shown in an Al-Qaeda video released by Al Qaeda leader Ayman al-Zawahiri called "Three Sheikhs of Jihad".

== See also ==
- Targeted killing
- War in North-West Pakistan
