= Qatar counter-terrorism strategy =

In the mid-1990s, Qatar adopted a more independent foreign policy and took diplomatic role of a mediator in conflicts within Arab states and increasingly plays active roles in global anti-terrorism campaigns and peacemaking. Its counterterrorism policy involves a combination of enactment of anti-terrorism laws for home land security and mediation between designated international terrorist groups and states using its “Open-door Policy”, to facilitate peace talks. Its position in the Middle East and close links with terrorist groups is seen as a great asset to western intelligence community.

During the 2014 Gaza war, US secretary of state John Kerry aligned with Qatar and Turkey to use their relationships with Hamas to pressure the group to end the conflict with Israel. Qatar was the only Arab state with diplomatic ties with Israel. Qatar was involved in mediations in Lebanon, Sudan, Yemen and in border conflict between Djibouti and Eritrea in 2008.

Qatar mediated a prisoners’ swap for the release of a US soldier Sergeant Bowe Bergdahl held by the Taliban in exchange for the release of five senior Taliban leaders held in Guantanamo Bay by the United States. The released leaders were handed to Qatar to be held in Doha for continued security watch according to the prisoners’ swap agreement between Qatari and the United States Governments. Afghan government opposed the transfer of the released Taliban leaders to Qatar describing it as illegal and a breach of international laws and accused Qatar of colluding with the US in its operations in the Middle East. Months following the release of the US soldier, Qatar mediated the release of 45 Fijian United Nations peacekeepers who were abducted in Golan Heights by an Al Qaeda affiliate Jabhat Al-Nusra in Syria in September 2014. This sparked suspicion and allegations of terrorism and terror financing against Qatar. These allegations climaxed with the 2017 diplomatic crisis in which all members of GCC severed diplomatic ties with Qatar. In 2003, Qatar began enacting anti-terrorism laws and prosecuting designated terror suspects and financiers living within its territory. In 2017, it signed an agreement with the US to combat terrorism financing. Qatar hosts US military base for operations in the Middle East and donates funds and arms to NATO and other organizations for counter terrorism operations in the region. The US describes Qatar counterterrorism cooperation after the 9/11 attack as “significant”.

== Background ==
Qatar’s anti-terrorism policy followed a shift from its foreign policy of collectivism acting with the Gulf Cooperation Council (GCC) to an independent foreign policy as it seeks more visibility and global recognition and began to form alliance with regional and western powers and engaging in conflict mediations. The Middle East Journal wrote that Qatar’s mediation objective is “state survival” and the “desire for international prestige”. Qatar became notable in international politics; and a key figure in the Arab affairs within two decades of its independent foreign policy. The key strategy in its foreign policy and mediation are its neutrality in mediation and the use of its wealth in pacifying antagonistic parties in settling conflicts. However, during the Libyan and Syrian wars, it became partial by funding some armed groups that were of special interest to it. Qatar major western ally is the United States and has been described by Arab states as pro west and criticized for supporting western military operations in the region and accused of providing clandestine support to terrorist organizations. Qatar signed a Defense Cooperation Agreement with the US after a joint military operation, Operation Desert Storm in 1991. In 2003, the US relocated its Combat Air Operation Center and other military facilities for the Middle East hosted at Prince Sultan Airbase in Saudi Arabia to Al Udeid airbase in Doha. The airbase serves as the US Central Command (CENTCOM) for all its military operations including in Afghanistan and Iraq.

== Mediation ==
=== Palestine, Hamas and Israel ===
In the build up to 2006 Palestinian legislative election, Qatar reportedly warned the US against holding the election to avoid a major political upset that Hamas likely victory would cause. Hamas won majority votes in the election giving the group a legitimate power over Gaza. The US government through secretary of state, Condoleezza Rice then requested Qatar’s assistance to mediate the peace process between Palestinian Authority, Hamas and Israel by hosting Hamas leaders in Doha to facilitate peace talks against the request by Tehran to host the group. The US diplomats in Qatar did not have direct discussion with Hamas; US messages were passed through Qatari authorities to Hamas leaders who were kept under close security watch. Qatar is the only GCC state with diplomatic ties with Israel and relationship with Hamas. During the 2014 Gaza war, US secretary of state John Kerry requested Qatar and Turkey to use their relationships with Hamas to pressure the group to end the conflict in the Gaza Strip. During the negotiation, John Kerry called Qatari foreign minister 75 times and met with him alongside their Turkish counterpart in Paris. The negotiation failed. Egypt then mediated between Israel and Hamas.

Following the end of 2014 hostility in the Gaza strip, Qatar started sending humanitarian goods and funding reconstruction of Gaza along with United Nations and Israel. All goods from Qatar to Gaza passed through Erez Crossing and were scrutinized by Israeli authorities to prevent any clandestine arms transfer to Hamas. Qatar financial aid is used for funding education, building homes and fuel and energy supply in Gaza. Qatar’s relationship with Israel and humanitarian activities in Gaza was criticized by other Arab states.

=== Afghanistan, Taliban and the US ===
In 2012, Obama administration requested Qatar to host Taliban leaders as part of its “open-door policy” to aide peace talk after Taliban expressed preference for Qatar because according to Taliban, Qatar is a neutral location with balanced relations with all sides and has a prestigious status in the Islamic world. Congress members in Washington accused Qatar of supporting terrorist groups by hosting Taliban and Hamas within its territory because Obama administration did not share details with them. On 3 July 2012, Director of the Central Intelligence Agency David Petraeus stated that: “Our partners should remember that Qatar—at our request—welcomed delegations from the Taliban and Hamas, and that Qatar is now home to our military headquarters for our operations throughout the Middle East.” Obama administration continued with its counterterrorism cooperation and expanded the US military base in Qatar. In 2017, Donald Trump during a visit to the Persian Gulf region stated that all GCC leaders had accused Qatar as the main funder of extremism contradicting his secretary of state Rex Tillerson who had hours earlier stated that "The emir of Qatar has made progress in halting financial support and expelling terrorist elements from his country". Citing a leaked email in July 2017, New York Times wrote that United Arabs Emirate and Qatar competed to host Taliban within their territory but that US agreed to host them in Qatar due to their long counterterrorism cooperation with state.

== Military cooperation ==
=== United States airbase ===
Qatar hosts the largest United States overseas military air base at Al-Udeid air field since 2003 following its relocation from Saudi Arabia. The base serves as forward headquarters for the US Special Operations Central Command (SOCCENT) and Air Force Central Command (AFCENT). All US counterterrorism operations in the Middle East including Afghanistan and Iraq were conducted from the base in Qatar. Al Udeid and other facilities in Qatar serve as logistics, command, and basing hubs for the U.S. military operations. In 2018, two USAF Rockwell B-1B Lancer bombers from the 34th Bomb Squadron flew from the base to participate in the 2018 missile strikes against Syria. In June 2019, two F-22 Raptors were stationed at the base amid rising tension in Iran. Royal Air Force forward operation unit was also hosted at the Al-Udeid air base. In 2009, RAF decentralized its fighter jets and moved the British Tornados and C10s stationed at base to other locations. Beginning in 2014, RAF used the base as its headquarters for Operation Shader conducting air strikes against Islamic State of Iraq and the Levant from the base. In 2017, it was estimated that a total of $10 billion dollars had been spent building and maintaining the based with Qatar contributing over $9 billion dollars while US spent $1 billion.

== See also ==
- Qatar and state-sponsored terrorism
