= Abdel-Hakim al-Hasidi =

Libyan rebel commander

Abdel-Hakim al-Hasidi is a leading member of the Libyan Islamic Fighting Group and a commander of the 2011 Libyan civil war anti-Gaddafi forces.

== Biography ==
According to The Wall Street Journal, al-Hasidi spent five years in an Afghan training camp. In 2002, al-Hasidi was captured in Peshwar, Pakistan, and was later handed to US forces. He was subsequently held in Libya before his release in 2008. In March 2011, as reported by the Italian newspaper Il Sole 24 Ore, al-Hasidi stated that he had fought against "the foreign invasion" of Afghanistan. In the same interview, al-Hasidi said that his fighters had ties with the militant Islamist al-Qaeda organisation. During the Libyan civil war, al-Hasidi commanded the Abu Salim Martyrs Brigade which consisted of 300 recruits from Derna, Libya.

=== Politics ===
In 2012, al-Hasidi ran for local office in Derna.

== Sources ==
- "Al-Qaeda sets up 'Islamic emirate' in eastern Libya". Hürriyet Daily News. Agence France-Presse. February 23, 2011.
- Richard Spencer (18 Mar 2011). "Libya: the West and al-Qaeda on the same side". The Daily Telegraph.

=== Interviews ===
- Anthony Shadid (March 7, 2011). "Diverse Character in City Qaddafi Calls Islamist". The New York Times.
- Sara Daniel (14 April 2011). "Libye "Si l'Occident ne nous aide pas à éliminer Kadhafi..."". sara-daniel.com (in French). Archived from the original on 28 October 2013.
- Rod Nordland (April 24, 2011). "Libyan, Once a Detainee, Is Now a U.S. Ally of Sorts". The New York Times.
