= Moussa Mohamed Kalifa =

Libyan citizen (born 1967)

Moussa Mohamed Kalifa (موسى محمد خليفة) (born in 1967) is a Libyan citizen who was charged with being a member of the Libyan Islamic Fighting Group, and accused of participating in terrorism after he attempted to move to Canada as a refugee under a false name in 2001.

== Life ==
In 1993, Kalifa traveled to Damascus to study Islamic scholarship, but was arrested by Yemeni authorities five years later for failing to have any identification papers. He had spent two years studying at the Islamic Institute, and four years teaching children.

He left Yemen for Tanzania, but was detained after the 1998 bombing of the American embassy in Tanzania and questioned for twenty days.

Leaving Tanzania, Kalifa sought refugee status in Italy where he lived for approximately three years. After his four months of government-sponsored housing expired, he was homeless and lived on the streets for approximately a year, before being offered a 6-month position as an Imam at a Moroccan mosque. He then decided to try and immigrate to Canada.

== Immigration to Canada ==
Kalifa purchased a travel ticket, under the false name El Lorrehane which appeared on his forged Italian passport, to take him from Madrid to New York City to Quebec City.

Upon his arrival, on August 6, 2001, he introduced himself by his legitimate name to Customs officer Nathalie Hamel, requesting refugee status and stating that he had destroyed his false passport on the flight. She referred him to the Immigration officers on-site, to whom he introduced himself as Mohamed Ahmed Alhimede which they believed to be his proper name.

Over the next three days he was processed, and intelligence officers became suspicious that he was in fact Kalifa, presenting him with a photograph which he denied was himself despite "a certain resemblance". Although he was traveling on a forged Italian passport, and his luggage contained Italian clothing and a business card from Rome, he initially denied ever traveling to Italy; as well as Yemen, Tanzania or Germany. He later confessed to his identity and travels. He maintained that while he was a Salafist preacher, his group had no ties to the GSPC
