= Al-Arab Medical University =

Former public university in Benghazi, Libya

- جامعة العرب الطبية
- Type: Public
- Active: 1984–2010
- Location: Benghazi, Benghazi, Libya

Al-Arab Medical University (Arabic: جامعة العرب الطبية; Romanised: Jamiaat Al-Arab Al-Tibiya) was a public university located in Benghazi, Libya, founded in 1984. It is now the Faculty of Medicine of the University of Benghazi.

== History ==
In 1976, the name of the University of Benghazi was changed to Garyounis University. In 1984, the Faculty of Human Medicine moved to its new building in Beloun neighborhood and became a separate university named Al-Arab Medical University.

In 1999, it merged again with Garyounis University. In 2007, it separated again under the name of Al-Arab Medical University until the end of 2010, when the university rejoined Garyounis University.

In 2011, Garyounis University again changed its name to the University of Benghazi. The former Al-Arab Medical University is now the Faculty of Medicine of the University of Benghazi.

== See also ==
- List of Islamic educational institutions
