= Ali al-Sallabi =

Libyan Islamist

Dr. Ali Muhammad al-Sallabi
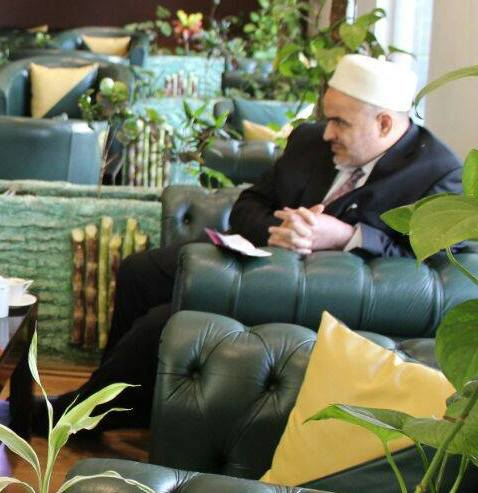
- Born: 1963 (age 62–63); Libya
- Occupations: Historian, Speaker

Ali Muhammad al-Sallabi, or al-Salabi (Arabic: علي محمد الصلابي; born 1963 in Benghazi) is a Muslim historian, religious scholar and Islamist politician from Libya. He was arrested by the Gaddafi regime, then left Libya and studied Islam in Saudi Arabia and Sudan during the 1990s. He then studied in Qatar under Yusuf al-Qaradawi and returned to Libya during the 2011 overthrow of Gaddafi and distributed weapons, money, and aid to Islamist groups in the country. His actions were criticized by members of the internationally recognized Libyan government under the National Transitional Council who he in turn criticized as being secular.

Sallabi has written several books which have been published and widely distributed by Saudi-based companies to English and Arabic speaking audiences. He is the son of Muhammad Salabi. He is an author of some books which are read across the globe by people of all religions.

Sallabi was placed under the Terrorist watch list and issued a travel ban by a number of Arab Nations following the 2017 Qatar diplomatic crisis.

== Politics ==
=== During Gaddafi regime ===
Under the rule of Muammar Gaddafi, Sallabi was detained in the infamous Abu Salim prison for eight years. After being released, he studied theology in Saudi Arabia and Sudan, obtaining his doctorate in 1999 from the Omdurman Islamic University in Sudan.

After living for a time in Yemen, in 1999 Sallabi moved to Qatar where he studied under Yusuf al-Qaradawi, the spiritual head of the international Muslim Brotherhood who lives in Doha, the Qatari capital.

As a member of the Muslim Brotherhood himself – a movement he had joined at an early age along with his father – Sallabi was welcomed by al-Qaradawi as well as by the Qatari ruling family, the most prominent patron of the international movement. Qatari-sponsored TV station al-Jazeera broadcast several appearances of Sallabi, in which he decidedly aligned himself with al-Qaradawi and his pro-Islamism ideological positions.

The Qatari rulers encouraged Sallabi to work on a reconciliation deal offered by Gaddafi once the sanctions were lifted on the Libyan regime in 2003. Sallabi then returned to Libya, where he directed a program to de-radicalize imprisoned militants.

Sallabi is also associated with Abdelhakim Belhadj, emir of the Libyan Islamic Fighting Group (LIFG) and one of the commanders of the National Liberation Army.

The Libyan Islamic Fighting Group is a terrorist group allied with al-Qaeda, that provided some of al-Qaeda the highest ranking and most trusted operatives. Belhajd had fought in Afghanistan and contributed to the growth of al-Qaeda in the country. Burr claims that Belhadj had followed Osama bin-Laden moving al-Qaeda's headquarters from Sudan to Afghanistan in 1996.

In 2004 Belhadj was arrested by Malaysian officials upon his arrival at the Kuala Lumpur airport, sent to Thailand upon extraordinary rendition on behalf of the U.S. and then sent back to Libya, where he was detained in harsh conditions for 6 years.

In 2009 Al-Sallabi began acting as a mediator in negotiations between the Gaddafi government and the LIFG (whose members were in prison). However, J. Millard Burr, a senior fellow at the American Center for Democracy, reported that Sallabi became involved with Col. Gaddafi's son, Saif al-Islam Gaddafi, in a Qatar-backed series of negotiations that aimed at having Islamist prisoners released from Libyan prisons during his time in Qatar. By 2006, "more than one hundred Ikhwan [Muslim Brotherhood] members were released," and "by 2008 hundreds of members of the Libyan Islamic Fighting Group had also been freed."

According to Burr, Belhaji himself was freed from prison in Libya in an amnesty negotiated by Gaddafi's son in 2010.

=== During Libyan Revolution of 2011 ===
During the Libyan Revolution of 2011 Sallabi was Qatar's main distributor of the Qatari government's military, humanitarian and cash aid to the Libyan rebels and much of this aid ended up in the hands of Islamists like Belhadj who commanded a rebel group in Libya's western mountains and Sallabi's brother Ismail, who commanded a rebel group from Benghazi. As he told reporters later on, Sallabi had asked Qatar's assistance during the initial phase of the revolution.

Sallabi acted as the key conduit to deliver Qatar's $2 billion aid through over a dozen shipments of "humanitarian aid, money, and arms" to the rebels. In October 2011, the international relations expert Daniel Wagner described Sallabi as Libya's most influential politician. However, The Washington Post columnist Marc Fisher reported that this privileged relationship with the Qatari rulers, that facilitated Qatar's role in ousting Gaddafi, also raised "suspicions among some Libyans about the gulf state's motives." Overall, Qatar provided Libyan rebels with "tens of millions of dollars in aid, military training and more than 20,000 tons of weapons."

=== Following the Libyan Civil War of 2011 ===
In November 2011, after the death of Gaddafi, al-Sallabi announced the formation of the National Gathering for Freedom, Justice and Development, an Islamic party later renamed "Libyan National Party" that would follow "Turkish-style moderation" and would run in the country's upcoming elections.

In a 2011 interview with The Telegraph reporter Richard Spencer, Sallabi stressed that the National Gathering for Freedom, Justice and Development was a nationalist party with a political agenda centered on Libya's culture and the respect for Islamic principles. The cleric strongly denied his alleged Islamist leanings; yet, Sallabi claimed that the National Gathering intended to base Libya's new constitution on Sharia law.

Moreover, according to Spencer, he "would not criticise Hamas' support for armed struggle against Israel, and he supported the lifting of Gaddafi-era laws banning polygamy."

Al-Sallabi has sharply criticised Mahmoud Jibril, the president of the National Transitional Council, Libya's interim government. Al-Sallabi has denounced Jibril and his allies as "extreme secularists" who would try to enrich themselves. He claimed that the new administration was "worse than Gaddafi."

The internationally recognized Libyan government under the National Transitional Council criticized Sallabi and the Qatari government for overwhelmingly supporting Islamist factions of the Libyan rebels. Qatar's arming of Islamists who were opposed to the secularists in the National Transitional Council was said to be one of the main reasons that the NTC was unable to establish a monopoly on security in the country following the overthrow of Gaddafi.

== Controversial ties ==
Several experts and journalists have voiced concerns that Sallabi's relations with the Qatari ruling family was exploited by Qatar to export the country's Wahhabi brand of Sunni Islam. Just like Saudi Arabia, Qatar has devoted significant efforts to spread Wahhabism around the globe and to win spheres of influence by funding mosques, schools, cultural events, and by devolving billions of dollars in military contracts and real estate investments. The Arab Spring has offered valuable opportunities as well, as demonstrated by the decisive role played by a number of Qatari-sponsored actors in Libya.

Equally controversial is Sallabi's affiliation with Yusuf al-Qaradawi. The Doha-based Egyptian theologian has been denied access to the UK, France, and the U.S. for his alleged terrorist and extremist ties.

Sallabi's affiliation with the Muslim Brotherhood was in fact solid and traced back to his youth. However, the Libyan National Party (LNP) founded by Sallabi also registered a high number of members of the al-Qaeda linked Libyan Islamic Fighting Group (LIFG). In a November 2007 video message, al-Qaeda deputy emir Ayman al-Zawahiri announced a formal merger between al-Qaeda and LIFG.

== Works ==
Sallabi has written no less than 10 books which have been translated into English and published by two Saudi-based publishing houses with offices in the United States (Darussalam Publishers and International Islamic Publishing House).

Al-Sallabi has also gained a wide audience among Muslims in the West due to his vast writings and scholarship on the early history of Islam. His biographical works on the Islamic prophet Muhammad and the early Caliphate add up to over 8,000 pages across several volumes. They have been translated in their entirety into English by several reputable publishers.

- al-Wasatiyah fi al-Qur'an al-Karim, Master's thesis, Omdurman Islamic University
- Noble Life of The Prophet (3 Vols), Dar-us-Salam Publications, 2005
- The Biography Of Abu Bakr As-Siddeeq, Dar-us-Salam Publications, 2007
- Umar bin Khattab His Life and Times (2 Vols), Dar-us-Salam Publications, 2010
- The Biography Of Uthman Ibn Affan (R) - Dhun-Noorayn, Dar-us-Salam Publications, 2007
- Ali ibn Abi Talib (2 Vols), Dar-us-Salam Publications, 2011
- Umar bin Abd Al-Aziz (R), Dar-us-Salam Publications, 2011
- Faith in Allah, the Mighty and Majestic, International Islamic Publishing House (IIPH), 2009
- Salah Ad-Deen Al-Ayubi (3 Vols), IIPH Publications, 2010
- al-Hasan ibn 'Ali: His Life and Times, IIPH Publications, 2014

== Personal life ==
al-Sallabi is from a family of Turkish origin.
