= Sanabal Charitable Committee =

Front organisation for funding terrorism

The Sannabil Charitable Committee was a charity front in the United Kingdom which raised money for the banned terrorist organization called the Libyan Islamic Fighting Group, which is aligned with al-Qaeda. Sannabil was banned worldwide, and its assets frozen, on 7 February 2006 by the United Nations Security Council Committee 1267. Several related corporations and individuals were embargoed at the same time (see Libyan Islamic Fighting Group).

In the Combatant Status Review Tribunal of Fenaitel Daihani, some of the evidence against him was his previous work for Sannabil. The Combatant Status Review Tribunal states:

- "The Sannabil Charitable Committee is considered a fund raising front for the Libyan Islamic Fighting Group."
- "The Libyan Islamic Fighting Group is listed as a terrorist organization in the U.S. Dept. of Homeland Security Terrorist Organization Reference Guide."

Al Daihani, an accountant at Kuwait's State Audit Bureau, stated that he thought the Sannabil Committee was a legitimate charity, with its headquarters in London.

In May 2006 police Greater Manchester Police's anti-terrorism unit conducted 18 raids under the 2000 Terrorism Act, including the offices of the Sannabil Relief Agency. The BBC reported that these raids were linked to support for the insurgency in Iraq. Seven other people were arrested and charged at the same time on a mix of terrorism and immigration charges. Nasuf was due to be deported back to Libya under new powers given to the Home Secretary to deport any foreign national thought to be a security threat. Ten suspects were arrested. Two were released. Among the remaining eight suspects was a Libyan refugee named Tahir Nasuf.
