= Noman Benotman =

Member of al-Qaeda

Noman M. Benotman (born 1967) is a former Libyan Islamist militant. A former member of the Libyan militant organization known as the Libyan Islamic Fighting Group, he has been active in reforming his former terrorist comrades in prison, attempting to persuade them to renounce violence. He wrote an open letter to Osama bin Laden in 2010, repudiating al-Qaeda's use of violence, and calling on bin Laden to unilaterally halt all attacks. He is also a senior analyst (Strategic Communications) at Quilliam.

== Early life ==
Benotman comes from a wealthy family in Tripolitania that faced persecution under the Gaddafi regime, which confiscated many properties owned by his father and other prominent Libyan families.

== Afghanistan ==
During the 1980s, as Gaddafi's oppression intensified, Benotman fled Libya and joined the jihad against the Soviet occupation of Afghanistan. Following years of conflict, the Soviet Union withdrew its troops from Afghanistan, which was seen as a victory for the jihadist movement.

== Anti-Gaddafi armed opposition ==
With the experience gained from fighting in Afghanistan, Benotman came to believe that Libya was similarly oppressed and sought to establish a network to combat Gaddafi's regime. This effort led to the founding of the Libyan Islamic Fighting Group (LIFG) in the late 1980s and early 1990s, which aimed to overthrow Gaddafi. The LIFG became a significant threat to Gaddafi, using various tactics to challenge his rule.

Numerous assassination attempts on Gaddafi occurred throughout his 42 years in power, but none were successful. The regime utilized Libya's oil wealth and resources to suppress the LIFG and other opposition groups, leading to the capture and execution of many LIFG members. The LIFG continued its struggle until the September 11 attacks in 2001, after which the U.S. and U.K. designated the group as a terrorist organization, halting its operations against Gaddafi. Reports indicated that Osama bin Laden had financially supported the LIFG, providing funds and weaponry.

== Mediation with Gaddafi ==
In early 2007, facing pressure from Gaddafi for the British government to extradite individuals like Benotman, he sought asylum in the UK, obtaining citizenship that protected him from deportation. During this time, he became involved in politics and was selected to mediate the release of his former comrades from prison, receiving backing from the British government in his efforts to promote the deradicalization of radical Islamists.

Benotman successfully mediated the release of many of his former comrades, although he faced criticism from some who regarded him as a traitor for his dealings with the Gaddafi government.

== Quillam Foundation and media profile ==
Benotman is the president of the Quilliam Foundation in London and has appeared on various television networks as an expert on terrorism and Middle Eastern affairs, particularly regarding the Arab Spring. Despite his past connections with Saif al-Islam Gaddafi, who he met during the Libyan crisis in 2011 while under British government supervision, he has openly discussed the infiltration of Islamist militants into Libya.
