= Abdelhakim Belhaj =

Libyan politician and military leader

- Born: 1 May 1966 (age 60); Souq al Jum'aa, Tripoli, Libya
- Spouse: Fatima Boudchar
- Military career
- Allegiance: Libyan Islamic Fighting Group (1995–2017) (Libya) National Transitional Council (2011–2012)
- Branch: (Libya) National Liberation Army
- Commands: Leader of the al-Watan Party and former head of Tripoli Military Council
- Conflicts: Afghan Civil War; Libyan Civil War

Abdelhakim Belhaj (or Belhadj; Arabic: عبد الحكيم بلحاج, nom de guerre: Abu Abdallah Assadaq) (born 1 May 1966) is a Libyan politician and military leader. He is the leader of the Islamist al-Watan Party and former head of the Tripoli Military Council. He was the emir of the defunct Libyan Islamic Fighting Group, an anti-Gaddafi guerrilla group.

As of June 2017, following the 2017 Qatar diplomatic crisis, Belhadj was placed on a terrorist watchlist on suspicion of terrorism-related activities with Qatari support, with Egypt, the UAE, Bahrain, Saudi Arabia, and Libya's Tobruk government among those supporting this claim.

== Early life ==
Born on 1 May 1966 in the Souq al Jum'aa area of Tripoli, Belhaj studied at Al Fateh University, where he earned a civil engineering degree. During the years after his studying, he is said to have travelled extensively, spending time in Sudan, Turkey, Pakistan, Syria, as well as London and Denmark.

== Libya, Afghanistan/Soviet war, Libyan Islamic Fighting Group ==
Wanting to rid Libya of Colonel Gaddafi, Belhaj joined other young Islamists who formed a group, but were chased from the country before they could achieve anything. Leaving the country via Saudi Arabia he arrived in Afghanistan, in 1988, and became an Islamist fighter in the Soviet–Afghan War.

In 1992, after the Mujahideen took Kabul, he travelled across the Middle East and Eastern Europe, before returning to Libya in 1992. There he and others formed the Libyan Islamic Fighting Group (LIFG), which tried to overthrow Colonel Gaddafi from 1994 onwards. Belhadj was known during this period as Abu Abdullah al-Sadiq, and was part of the LIFG that fought an insurgency campaign based from eastern Libya. But after three unsuccessful assassination attempts on Gaddafi, the LIFG was crushed in 1998.

== Arrest in Bangkok, return to Libya via CIA rendition ==
Some of the former guerrilla fighters joined the al-Qaeda ranks and contributed to the growth of al-Qaeda in Afghanistan . Several LIFG fighters also held prominent positions within al-Qaeda's leadership.

A report published on 13 October 2014 by the American Center for Democracy and authored by J. Millard Burr (co-author of the controversial 2006 book Alms for Jihad) posited that in 1996 Balhadj followed Bin Laden when al-Qaeda leader moved the centre of its operations from Afghanistan to Sudan.

The relation between LIGF and al-Qaeda was officially confirmed in October 2001, when the UN Security Council designated the Libyan Islamic Fighting Group as a terrorist entity for its association with al-Qaeda, Bin Laden and the Taliban. The UN Security Council specified that the LIFG relation with al-Qaeda was substantiated through the group's involvement in "the financing, planning, facilitating, preparing or perpetrating of acts or activities by, in conjunction with, under the name of, on behalf or in support of", "supplying, selling or transferring arms and related materiel to" or "otherwise supporting acts or activities of ... Al-Qaida ..., Usama bin Laden and the Taliban."

In 2002, after the September 11 attacks and Gaddafi's reconciliation with the West, an arrest warrant was issued for Belhadj by the Libyan authorities. In it, it was alleged by the Gaddafi government that Belhadj had developed "close relationships" with al-Qaeda leaders, and specifically Taliban chief Mullah Omar. Based in Jalalabad, he is alleged to have run and financed training camps for Arab mujahideen fighters. After the United States entered Afghanistan under the command of the United Nations to confront the Taliban, the remaining members of the LIFG left the country, and roamed Europe and South East Asia. However, the remaining LIFG affiliates merged with al-Qaeda in 2007, as announced by Bin Laden's deputy Ayman al-Zawahiri and LIFG senior operative Abu Laith al-Liby in two video clips released by Al-Sahab, the media production house of al-Qaeda.

Tracked by the U.S. Central Intelligence Agency (CIA), after a tip-off from the Secret Intelligence Service (MI6) gained from London-based informants, Belhadj was arrested with his pregnant wife in 2004 at Kuala Lumpur International Airport, Malaysia. Transferred on a plane to Bangkok, the couple were then placed in the custody of the CIA, where they were detained at a secret prison at Don Muang Royal Thai Air Force Base. Returned to Libya on the rendition aircraft N313P, he was held at the Abu Salim prison for seven years. However, his wife Fatima was quickly released after receiving torture.

In March 2010 under a "de-radicalisation" drive championed by Saif al-Islam Gaddafi, the Libyan authorities released him amongst 170 other Libyan Islamists. According to J. Millard Burr, Belhadj's release was part of a series of negotiations supported by the Qatari government, thanks to which over a hundred members of the Muslim Brotherhood and hundreds of members of the LIFG were freed by 2008. According to J. Millard Burr, Belhadj's long-time associate Ali al-Sallabi played a major role in Qatar's involvement in securing the amnesty for those prisoners.

Ali al-Sallabi is a Libyan religious scholar and Islamist politician affiliated to the Muslim Brotherhood who was jailed for his supposed involvement in a plot to assassinate Muammar Gaddafi. He then left Libya to study in Saudi Arabia and Sudan, and eventually moved to Qatar in the late 1990s. In Qatar, Sallabi was welcomed by the Qatari ruling family as well as by the Muslim Brotherhood ideologue Yusuf al-Qaradawi. Returned to Libya after the lifting of sanctions on the Libyan regime in 2003, Sallabi actively contributed to and eventually directed the de-radicalization program for former militant detainees.

In March 2011, Belhadj appeared in an unreleased Al Jazeera film, in which he praised the mediation of Saif al-Islam for his release. In response, Gaddafi's son said that the men who had been freed "were no longer a danger to society."

In December 2011, Belhajd began legal proceedings against the British government over its role in his rendition to Libya. Jack Straw denied any illegality in his actions as foreign secretary in the face of accusations that he had approved the British assistance in Belhadj's capture; In 2012, Tony Blair denied any memory of the incident.

In December 2013, a high court judge struck out Belhadj's case against the British government, on the grounds that if it were allowed to proceed it could potentially damage British national interests. At an Investigatory Powers Tribunal in January 2014, his lawyers said they had reason to suspect that GCHQ had been intercepting their phone calls with Libya-based Belhadj, and noted: "The right to confidential client-lawyer communication is a fundamental principle of justice." This later turned out to be the case, and but one case of many. "In how many cases has the government eavesdropped to give itself an unfair advantage in court?" wondered Dinah Rose, QC for Belhadj. In 2015, GCHQ was ordered to destroy legally privileged material of another Libyan rendition victim, Sami al-Saadi, that it had illegally intercepted.

In October 2016 Belhadj appealed the dismissal of charges against Mark Allen, who was the director counter-terrorism for MI6 when he was subjected to extraordinary rendition. Britain's Crown Prosecution Service dropped the charges against Allen in 2014, claiming they had insufficient evidence, even though the Metropolitan Police had provided them with a 28,000-page dossier. Belhadj's appeal relies on communication from Allen, found in the offices of Moussa Koussa the head of Muammar Gaddafi's intelligence service, after those offices were stormed by opposition forces, when Gaddafi was overthrown. In one letter Allen wrote: "I congratulate you on the safe arrival of [Belhaj]. This was the least we could do for you and for Libya to demonstrate the remarkable relationship we have built over recent years."

== Libyan civil war ==
Belhadj was made commander of the Tripoli Military Council, after the rebels took over Tripoli during Operation Mermaid Dawn in late August 2011.

A Kronos Advisory report stressed that on the 22 August takeover of Tripoli Belhadj was accompanied by Qatari staff Col. Hamad Abdullah al-Marri. In fact, Qatar had provided training, financial and military support to Belhadj's troops. Rebels under the leadership of Belhadj were trained by Qatari special forces in Western Mountains, in Libya, and were the beneficiaries of dozens of weapons shipments financed by Qatar.

Overall, Wall Street Journal columnists Sam Dagher, Charles Levinson, and Margaret Coker reported that "Qatar provided anti-Gadhafi rebels with what Libyan officials now estimate are tens of millions of dollars in aid, military training and more than 20,000 tons of weapons." Most of the shipments – the reporters stressed – went directly to rebel forces such as Belhadj's group rather than being regularly processed through the National Transitional Council.

Qatar was one of the first countries to recognize the National Transitional Council and strongly advocated for international support – especially from the Arab League – for the no-fly zone imposed by the UN to protect civilians in Libya. The country even provided fighter jets to implement the UN resolution and "offered financial guarantees to NATO if the war dragged on."

Belhadj, already in charge of coordinating defense under the Tripoli Military Council, was eventually appointed a member of the Supreme Security Council at a later stage of the 2011 revolution. In this capacity he reportedly went to Qatar with Ali al-Sallabi, brother and founder of the 17 February Brigades Ismail al-Sallabi, and the head of the National Transitional Council in Libya, Ghoulioune Abdel Jelil. In Qatar, according to Kronos Advisory reports, they met with "the financiers of the revolution and NATO officials." The goal of the meeting was to convince Western officials to extend NATO operations to implement additional measures to protect civilians.

After the rebels had completed their take over of Tripoli, a joint rebel/Human Rights Watch team found documents related to Belhadj and his return to Libya, originating from both the CIA and Britain's MI6. Interviewed jointly by journalists from The Guardian, Le Monde and BBC News's Jeremy Bowen, Belhadj showed the journalists documents relating to his case, and further co-operation between the CIA/MI6 and Libyan security forces under the command of Moussa Koussa. In a later interview with the captured Abdelati Obeidi, the former Libyan foreign minister under Gaddafi, commented that MI6 had been operating in Tripoli until the start of the revolution in February.

As a result of the allegations, British Prime Minister David Cameron made a statement in the House of Commons, which ordered the inquiry under Sir Peter Gibson, the current UK Intelligence Services Commissioner, to be widened to cover the Libyan allegations.

Several politicians and experts have claimed that Qatar was exploiting Belhadj to seek influence in Libya and to provide support to the Islamist faction in the country. Reuters reported former Prime Minister of Libya Mahmoud Jibril praising Qatar's military support but also warning of Qatar allegedly "siding with a faction against the rest of the Libyan people." Belhadj has denied that accusation.

== Alleged ties with Ansar al-Sharia ==
In a 2013 report, Foundation for Defense of Democracies senior fellow Daveed Gartenstein-Ross reported presumed links between Belhadj and Ansar al-Sharia, the Tunisian salafi jihadist group. Gartenstein-Ross wrote that a Tunisian investigator accused Abdelhakim Belhadj of sheltering Ansar al-Sharia leader Abu Iyadh al-Tunisi after the murder of two Tunisian opposition leaders Chokri Belaid and Mohamed Brahmi. Ansar al-Sharia is regarded as responsible for the assassination of the two politicians.

In addition to Belhadj's alleged implication in both murders, Tunisian attorney and investigator Taieb Laguili argued that the Libyan politician had long-standing ties with Ansar al-Sharia leadership and had trained Ansar al-Sharia members. Laguili posited that Belhadj's connection with the terrorist group as well as his ties to "a group of Tunisian and Libyan smugglers" were confirmed by the Tunisian interior ministry. Allegedly, the Libyan Islamic Fighting Group intended to "finance and arm Tunisian salafist elements for the purpose of connecting religious extremist currents under the same banner to create an Islamic state in North Africa."

== Politics ==
Belhadj resigned his leadership of the Tripoli Military Council on 14 May 2012, to begin his campaign for the Public National Conference elections. After launching the al-Wattan Party in the week of 20 May, he ran for office as its leader. The party won no seats, however.

== Family ==
Abdelhakim Belhadj had at least one brother, Younis Belhaj, who became a senior figure in the Tripoli Council. His wife Fatima Boudchar is of Moroccan descent. Belhadj also has a son Abderrahim, who was born shortly after Fatima's release from prison in 2004.

== Apology ==
On 10 May 2018, British Prime Minister Theresa May issued an official letter of apology for MI6's role in tipping off the CIA of Belhadj's location before the American-based spy agency captured him and his family and transferred them into Libyan custody. At the time, both Britain and America were seeking to mend relations with the Gaddafi regime and documents later showed that both nations saw Belhadj as a threat to these aspirations. The documents released in 2018 were originally recovered by a team from Human Rights Watch who raided the abandoned headquarters of Libyan's External Security Organisation (ESO) in 2011 after Gaddafi's downfall and showed that former British Prime Minister Tony Blair had been reaching out to Gaddafi ally Moussa Koussa since 2001 and that Koussa had also informed him that Gaddafi would mend relations with Britain if the country guaranteed him respect and gave him intelligence leading to the capture of LIFG leaders on the run, notably Belhadj. The British government also agreed to give Belhadj and his family £500,000 in compensation.
