= Omar al-Faruq =

Iraqi Islamic militant

- Born: Mahmoud Ahmad Mohammed Ahmad; 1969; Iraq
- Arrested: Bogor, Indonesia; Indonesian authorities
- Died: 25 September 2006 (aged 36–37); Basra, Iraq
- Citizenship: Iraqi
- Detained at: Bagram Theater Internment Facility
- Other name: Faruq al-Iraqi
- Status: escaped custody, deceased

Omar al-Faruq (Arabic: عمر الفاروق; 1969 – 25 September 2006), also spelled or al-Farouq or al-Farooq, born Mahmoud Ahmad Mohammed Ahmad, was an Islamic militant with high-profile connections with Al-Qaeda and Jemaah Islamiyah in Southeast Asia, particularly the Philippines and Indonesia.

== Biography ==
Born in Iraq. Al-Faruq was believed to have joined Al-Qaeda in the early 1990s where he was trained in Afghanistan. Soon after he rose up through the ranks into becoming one of Osama bin Laden's key lieutenants. US authorities believed Al-Faruq was behind the bomb and terror attacks that targeted embassies and thus, ordered his arrests when he was detected to have been entering Indonesia. After being captured in Bogor by Indonesian special forces in 2002, he was immediately handed over to the United States. Al-Faruq's capture was done using information derived from the capture of Abu Zubaydah. After his arrests, Al-Faruq later on revealed information about a plot to bomb a series of embassies and diplomatic compounds all across Southeast Asia, giving rise to the "yellow alert" of 10 September 2002.

After his arrests, Al-Faruq was later transferred to Bagram Theater Internment Facility in Afghanistan. In July 2005, Al-Faruq escaped from the prison alongside three other Al-Qaeda suspects. The U.S. government did not acknowledge his escape until November when it was revealed that the prosecutor cannot produce him as a witness when called by the defense attorney Michael Waddington, in the trial of U.S. military sergeant, Alan Driver who was accused of abuse at the prison.

On 25 September 2006, Al-Faruq was reported to have been killed by British soldiers that are operating in Basra. The operations took place in pre-dawn hours, involving more than 200 soldiers. There were no casualties from the security forces side.
