= Libyan Islamic Fighting Group =

Former Islamist armed group

Libyan Fighting Group (Al-Jama'a al-Islamiyyah al-Muqatilah bi-Libya)
- Leader: Abdelhakim Belhadj
- Dates active: 1990–2017
- Allegiance: Libya Dawn Coalition
- Active regions: Libya
- Ideology: Salafi jihadism Qutbism

The Libyan Islamic Fighting Group (LIFG), also known as Al-Jama'a al-Islamiyyah al-Muqatilah bi-Libya (Arabic: الجماعة الإسلامية المقاتلة بليبيا), was an armed Islamist group. Militants participated in the 2011 Libyan Civil War as the Libyan Islamic Movement (al-Harakat al-Islamiya al-Libiya), and are involved in the Libyan Civil War as members of the Libya Shield Force. Alleged militants include alleged Al Qaeda organizer Abd al-Muhsin Al-Libi who now holds a key command position in the Libya Shield Force.

In the 2011 civil war, members claim to have played a key role in deposing Muammar Gaddafi. The force was part of the National Transitional Council.

However, the organisation has a troubled history being under pressure from Muammar Gaddafi and shortly after the September 11 attacks, LIFG was banned worldwide (as an affiliate of al-Qaeda) by the UN 1267 Committee. Listed at the Foreign Terrorist Organizations, the group denied ever being affiliated with al-Qaeda, stating that it refused to join the global Islamic front Osama bin Laden declared against the west in 1998.

== History ==
LIFG was founded in 1990 by Libyans who had fought against Soviet forces in Afghanistan, but only revealed its existence publicly in 1995. Its objective was to establish an Islamic state in Libya. According to the Canadian Security Intelligence Service, the group viewed the Gaddafi regime as oppressive and anti-Muslim, and aimed to overthrow it. The group's first armed action came in Benghazi on September 6-7, 1995, resulting in the deaths of some 30 individuals. LIFG claimed responsibility for a failed assassination attempt against Gaddafi in February 1996, which was in part funded by MI6 according to David Shayler, and engaged Libyan security forces in armed clashes during the mid-to-late 1990s. They continued to target Libyan interests and engaged in sporadic clashes with Libyan security forces.

Adnkronos International reported that the group was founded in Afghanistan by Abu Laith Al Libi and other veterans of Soviet occupation of Afghanistan.

=== Relationship with Al-Qaeda ===
The LIFG links to Al-Qaeda hail from Afghanistan, where hundreds joined Al-Qaeda. High ranking LIFG operatives inside Al-Qaeda, are the leader of the insurgency Abdel-Hakim Belhadj (also known as Abu Abdullah al-Sadiq), and the recently killed Atiyah Abd al-Rahman, who was killed in a CIA drone strike, and Al-Qaeda's Abu Yahya al-Libi.

The Telegraph reported that senior Al Qaeda members Abu Yahya al-Libi and Abu Laith al-Libi were LIFG members. One of al-Qaeda's most senior members, Atiyah Abdul-Rahman, was purportedly a member of LIFG as well.

In an audio message published in November 2007 Ayman al-Zawahiri and Abu Laith al-Libi claimed that the Libyan Islamic Fighting Group had joined al-Qaeda. "Benotman fired back an open letter to Zawahiri questioning his credibility. "I questioned their idea of jihad ... directly you know. This is crazy, it is not Islamic and it's against the Sunni understanding of Islam," Benotman told CNN. Zawahiri chose not to respond. As late as this August Zawahiri's video statements included praise of LIFG leaders, in what may have been a desperate attempt to head off the condemnation he could see coming."

In November 2007 Noman Benotman, described as the "ex-head of the Libyan Islamic Fighting Group", published an open letter to al-Qaeda. According to The Times:

In November last year Noman Benotman, ex-head of the Libyan Islamic Fighting Group which is trying to overthrow the regime of Muammar Gaddafi, published a letter which asked Al-Qaeda to give up all its operations in the Islamic world and in the West, adding that ordinary westerners were blameless and should not be attacked.

Noman Benotman's letter to Zawahiri was published in Akhbar Libya (News) as an op-ed clarification in November 2007. The gist is that al-Qaeda's efforts have been counterproductive and used as "subterfuge" by some Western countries to extend their regional ambitions. These comments were first aired at a meeting in Kandahar in the summer of 2000.

On 10 July 2009, The Telegraph reported that some member organisations of the Libyan Islamic Fighting Group had split with Al Qaeda.

==== UK Terrorism Act 2000 ====
On 10 October 2005, the United Kingdom's Home Office banned LIFG and fourteen other militant groups from operating in the UK. Under the United Kingdom's Terrorism Act 2000, being a member of a LIFG is punishable with a 10-year prison term. The Financial Sanctions Unit of the Bank of England acting on behalf of HM Treasury issued the orders to freeze all their assets. Mohammed Benhammedi lived and worked in Liverpool at the time of the UN sanction against him. Sergey Zakurko, the father to his Lithuanian mistress was suspended from his job at the Ignalina Nuclear Power Plant (INPP) for fear that the link could pose a security threat.

The group was delisted from the United Kingdom proscribed organizations list in November 2019.

==== UN-embargoed LIFG affiliates and their subsequent de-listing ====
On 7 February 2006 the UN embargoed five specific LIFG members and four corporations, all of whom had continued to operate in England until at least October 2005. Those nine are in the following table; the accusations are according to the US State Department.

Abd Al-Rahman Al-Faqih	عبد الرحمن الفقيه	Possibly the same person as the jihadist writer Abdul-Rahman Hasan. Wanted in Morocco in connection with the mass murders of 16 May 2003 in Casablanca. Al-Faqih was convicted in 2006 of possessing documents related to terrorism.
Ghuma Abd'rabbah	غومه عبد الرباح	Trustee of the Sanabel terrorist charity, by which he transferred money and travel documents to terrorists abroad.
Abdulbaqi Mohammed Khaled	عبد الباقي محمد خالد	Trustee of the Sanabel terrorist charity; GIA affiliate.
Mohammed Benhammedi	محمد بن حامدي	Financier of LIFG.
Tahir Nasuf	طاهر ناصف	Previously of the Libyan GIA circle in the UK. He denied any relation with the LIFG. Nasuf was removed from the UN list 1267 list a few years later, at the British government's request.
Sara Properties Limited		Source of some of Benhammedi's money.
Meadowbrook Investments Limited		Source of some of Benhammedi's money.
Ozlam Properties Limited		Source of some of Benhammedi's money.
Sanabel Relief Agency Limited		Alias SARA, a charity front by which LIFG transacted with other al-Qaeda components (including GICM) via its office in Kabul, prior to the fall of the Taliban.

Al-Faqih, Nasuf, and a third man appealed being listed. Their appeal went all the way to the European Union's Court, which ordered the UK to delist the men, and return their passports.

The "Summary of Evidence" from Mohammed Fenaitel Mohamed Al Daihani's Combatant Status Review Tribunal states: "The Sanabal Charitable Committee is considered a fund raising front for the Libyan Islamic Fighting Group."

In June 2011, all of the entities included in the table above were de-listed by the United Nations Security Council Committee.

=== Reconciliation and mass release of prisoners ===
In September 2009 a new "code" for jihad, a 417-page religious document entitled "Corrective Studies", was published after more than two years of intense and secret talks between incarcerated leaders of the LIFG and Libyan security officials.

On 9 April 2008, Al Jazeera reported that Libya released at least over 90 members of the Libyan Islamic Fighting Group. The Italian press agency Adnkronos International reported the release was due to the efforts of Saif al-Islam Gaddafi, a son of Libyan leader Muammar Gaddafi, and leader of the charity Gaddafi International Foundation for Charity Associations. It reported that a third of the LIFG members Libya was holding were released. A further 200 prisoners were released in March 2010, including group leader Abdelhakim Belhadj.

In January 2011 members of the group threatened a return to violence unless still imprisoned members were released.

=== Libyan Civil War ===
In March 2011, members of the LIFG in Ajdabiya declared to the press that the group supports the revolt against Gaddafi's rule, and had placed themselves under the leadership of the National Transitional Council. They also stated that the group had changed its name to Libyan Islamic Movement (al-Harakat al-Islamiya al-Libiya), had around 500–600 militants released from jail in recent years, and denied any past or present affiliation with Al-Qaeda.

A leader of the LIFG, Abdelhakim Belhadj, became the commander of the Tripoli Military Council after the rebels took over Tripoli during the 2011 Battle of Tripoli. In March 2011, Abdel-Hakim al-Hasidi, a leading member of the group, admitted to the Italian newspaper Il Sole 24 Ore that his fighters had al-Qaeda links. Al-Hasidi was captured in 2002 in Peshawar, Pakistan, later handed over to the US, and then held in Libya before being released in 2008. He admitted in the same interview that he had earlier fought against "the foreign invasion" of Afghanistan.

In September 2011, Ismail Sallabi (a leader of LIFG) said in an interview to The Washington Post: "We want [Libyan Islamic Movement] to be a good government that comes from Islam, that respects human rights and personal freedoms," "The Islamic way is not something dangerous or wrong. The West hears 'Islamic law' and they think we want to lock our women in boxes," "The Islamic groups want a democratic country, and they want to go to the mosque without being arrested. They're looking for freedom like everyone else."

== Foreign relations ==
=== Designation as a terrorist organization ===
Countries and organizations below have officially listed the Libyan Islamic Fighting Group as a terrorist organization.

Country	Date	References
United Kingdom	October 2005 (until November 2019)	
United States	17 December 2004 (until 9 December 2015)	

== See also ==
- Moussa Mohamed Kalifa
- Abdel-Hakim al-Hasidi
- Former members of the Libyan Islamic Fighting Group
