= Thermal power plant of Vouvry =

Former power station in Switzerland

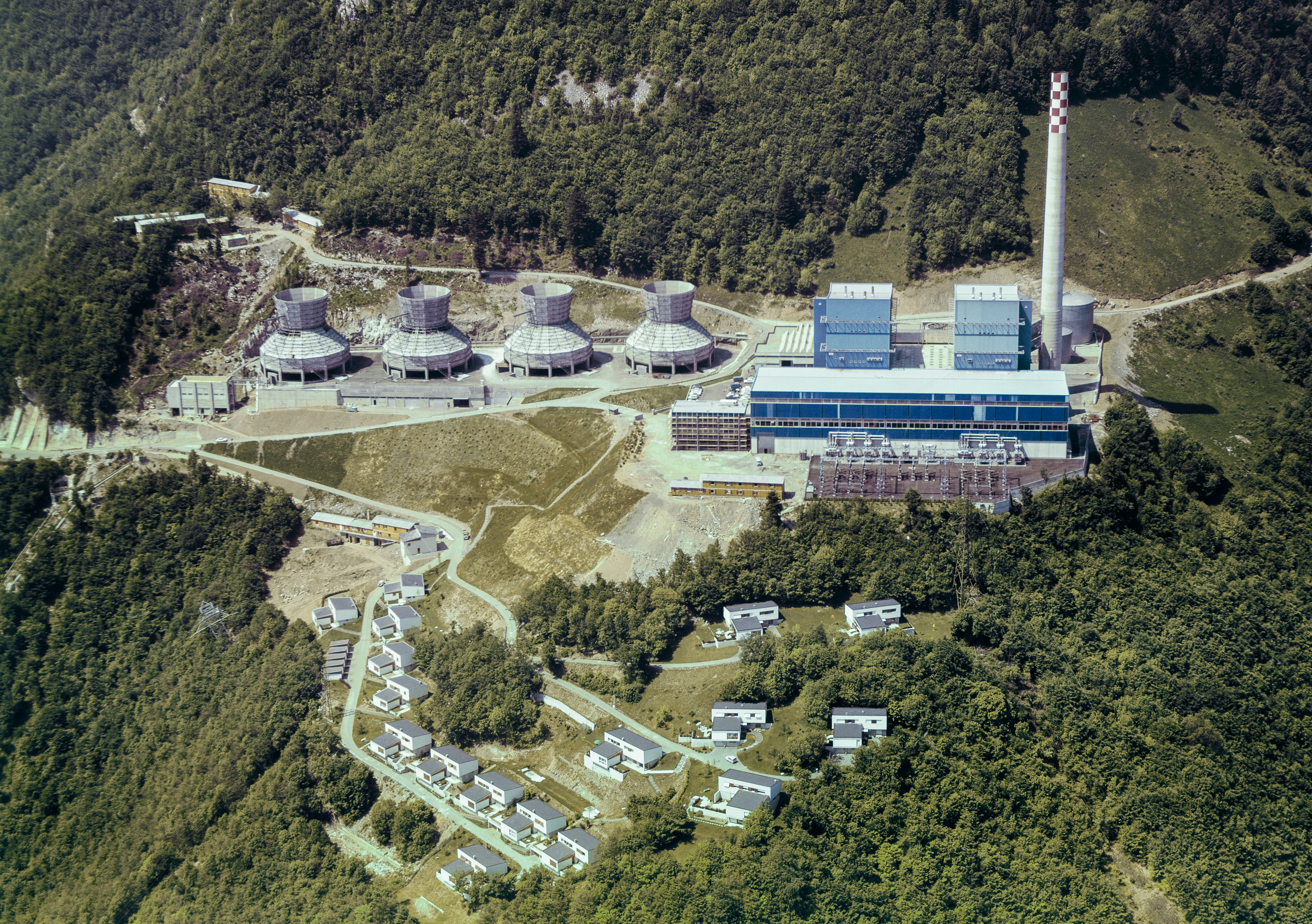
- View of the plant in 1967.
- Country: Switzerland
- Location: Vouvry, Valais
- Coordinates: 46°20′49″N 6°52′43″E
- Status: Decommissioned
- Commission date: 1965
- Decommission date: 1999
- Owner: Groupe Orllati (from 2017)

Thermal power station
- Primary fuel: Heavy fuel oil
- Chimneys: 2
- Thermal capacity: 300 MW

Power generation
- Nameplate capacity: 300 MW

External links
- Commons: Related media on Commons

The thermal power plant of Vouvry, also known as the Chavalon Plant, is a former power station located in the municipality of Vouvry, in the canton of Valais, Switzerland. Until its closure in 1999, the plant utilized heavy fuel oil, combusted to heat a steam generator. The vaporized water then drove a turbine, which powered an alternator.

As Switzerland's sole oil-fired power plant, it was constructed in 1965 by a consortium led by the company Énergie de l'Ouest-Suisse (EOS) to address the wintertime electricity production deficits of Swiss hydropower. Initially planned on the territory of the commune of Aigle in the canton of Vaud, it benefited from its proximity to the Collombey refinery, enabling it to produce electricity at preferential rates. However, by the late 1990s, the plant operation had generated significant financial losses, leading the operators to decommission the site. Since then, several rehabilitation projects have been proposed, but the plant remains abandoned.

The plant site, situated approximately 450 meters above the plain, was constructed to limit pollution. It consists of two plateaus and a slope and includes a main building housing the machine room, a 120-meter exhaust chimney, four cooling towers, a cable car station, and 17 villas, which Chavalon employees previously inhabited. The plant is connected to the Collombey refinery by a pipeline that primarily traverses the Stockalper Canal, which was utilized to provide makeup water. The generated electricity was fed into the Swiss power grid via a 220 kV high-voltage line.

== Geography ==
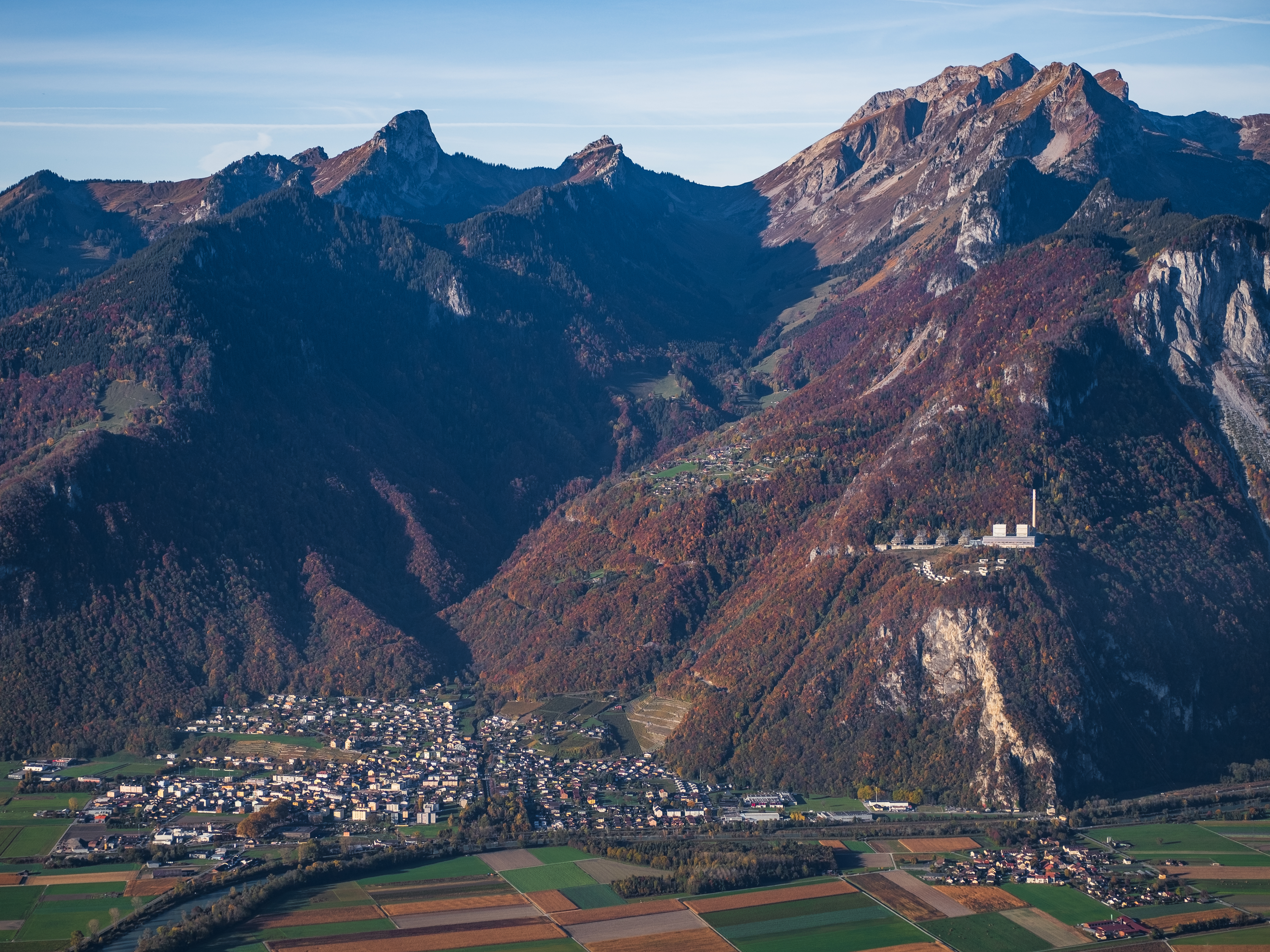
The Chavalon plant and the village of Vouvry as seen from Corbeyrier in 2021.

The Chavalon thermal power plant is situated in Switzerland, in the canton of Valais, on the territory of the municipality of Vouvry. It is located on the natural balcony of Chavalon, at an altitude of 825 meters, with a view of the Rhône plain from an altitude of 450 meters. The plant site is accessible from Vouvry by a cable car which operated between 1965 and 2005. Additionally, a road leads to the plant, diverging from the route to the village of Miex.

The plant buildings are distributed on a slope and two platforms are constructed from biogenic sedimentary rocks and evaporites based on limestone and, on occasion, marl. The platform for the plant building measures 27,000 m², while the one for the cooling towers is 10,000 m², for a total site area of 75,000 m².

== History ==
=== Genesis ===
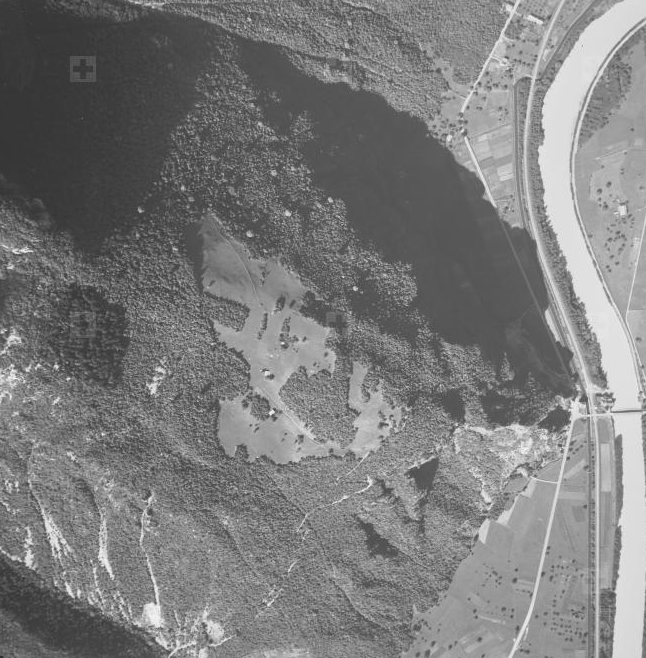
Aerial view of the Chavalon site in 1943.

In the 1950s, the Raffineries du Rhône company initiated a refinery project in the Swiss Chablais region. The Rhône pipeline was to transport oil from Genoa, Italy, to a refinery originally planned near Aigle in the canton of Vaud. However, since the pipeline passed through Valais, the canton requested that the refinery be located on its soil, and it was ultimately built in Collombey.

In 1959, the company Énergie de l'Ouest-Suisse (EOS) sought a solution to enhance its electricity production during winter months. To this end, it prepared a report recommending the expansion of hydroelectric plants and the construction of thermal power plants to address potential production shortages. Additionally, the report considered the feasibility of a nuclear power plant, although this technology was still in its developmental phase at the time. The presence of the Collombey refinery also facilitated the supply of a potential plant at favorable prices, thereby further motivating its construction.

To compensate for the change of canton of the refinery, the new plant was planned on the territory of the commune of Aigle. The project was led by a consortium between EOS and the "Raffineries du Rhône" company. In February 1961, a construction permit application was filed for a 150 MW plant with a 120-meter chimney at the site called "Les Îles." However, the project received 39 objections during the public inquiry, with the majority of concerns about sulfur dioxide (SO_{2}) pollution and its potential impact on the local environment and public health. Following several appeals from the population and the commune of Ollon, the Council of State of Vaud imposed a minimum chimney height of 300 meters. This prompted a reaction from the Federal Office of Aviation, which declared in January 1962 that such a tall chimney would be "extraordinarily dangerous" for air navigation and decided to limit its height to 180 meters. As a result, the consortium was forced to seek a new location.

Subsequently, the project was evaluated at four potential locations, three within the canton of Vaud and one within Valais, at the Porte-du-Scex site. The latter was selected as the most cost-effective option, estimated to be 25% cheaper than the others. To address the chimney issue, a "fumoduc" was proposed, which would vent the smoke to the Pro de Taila at an altitude of 1,270 meters. In 1962, the "Porte-du-Scex thermal power plant" company was established, with shareholders including EOS (40%), CFF (15%), Aluminium Suisse (10%), Lonza (10%), Raffineries du Rhône (5%), and Romande Énergie (5%). However, the soil quality at Porte-du-Scex proved to be inadequate, and ensuring the safety of a "fumoduc" system was challenging. The project was thus relocated once more, this time to the Pro de Taila site, which, however, proved to be excessively isolated. Ultimately, the Chavalon site was selected as a satisfactory compromise. The final construction site was confirmed in May 1963. The ventilation conditions at Chavalon were found to be optimal, and thus the chimney height was set at 120 meters. This height allowed the chimney to vent the plant's smoke at a height of nearly 950 meters above sea level, above the inversion layer (900 meters). Jean Lugeon, director of the Swiss Meteorological Institute, conducted environmental measurements and concluded that the risk of pollution should not exceed the tolerated time limit. The final project was approved on July 10, 1963, and the plant management company changed its name on January 21, 1964, to become "Vouvry SA thermal power plant." Facing financial difficulties, the "Raffineries du Rhône" sold its financial participation to the other shareholders in 1965.

=== Construction and commissioning ===
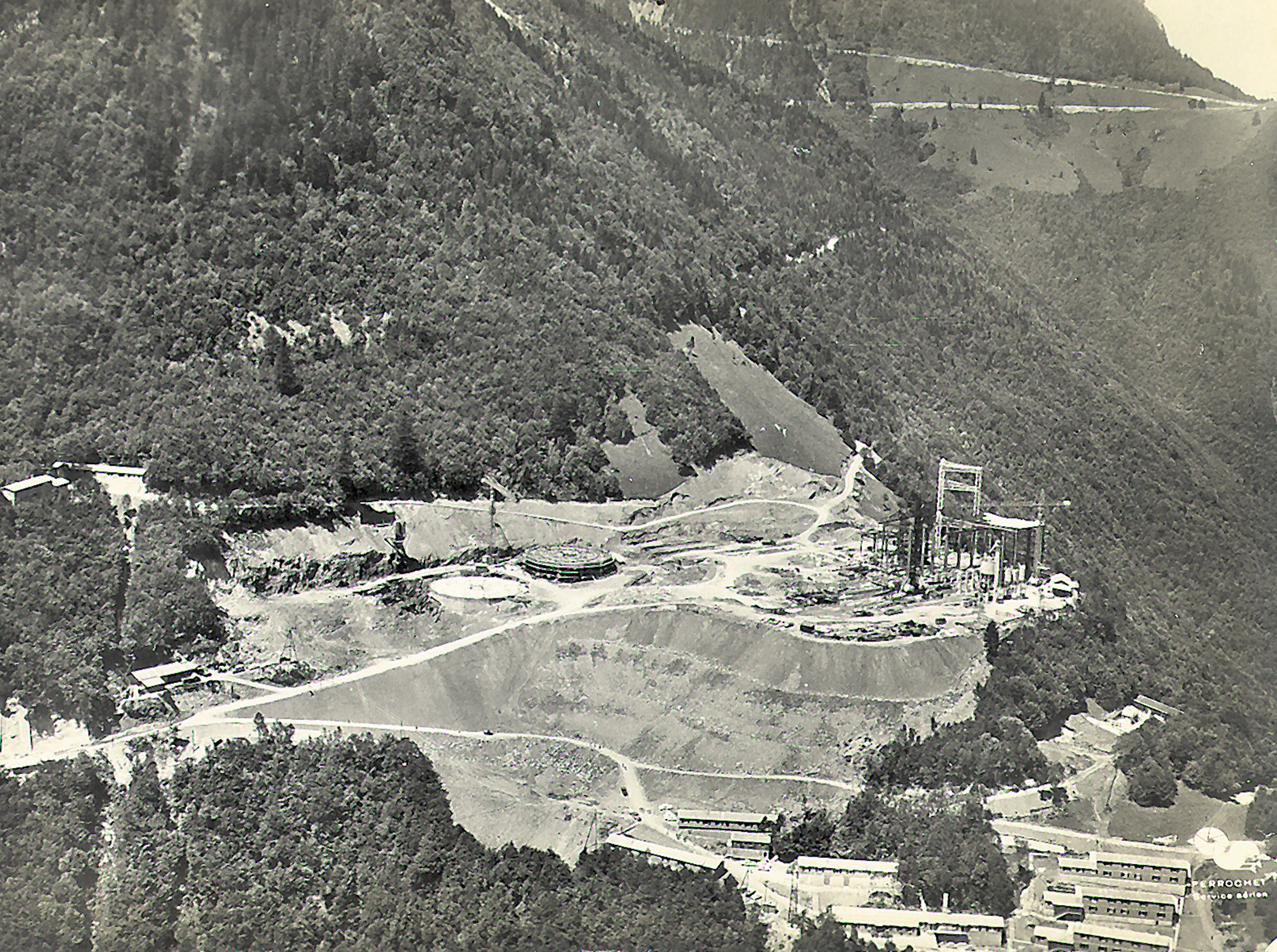
The power plant construction site.

Construction commenced in September 1963 with the construction of a 1.2-kilometer access road. The road was designed to accommodate heavy transport vehicles and could support a maximum weight of 130 tonnes. The terrain where the road was constructed presented significant challenges, with retaining walls reaching up to 20 meters. Transporting construction materials was a significant undertaking, with long pieces transported on the road throughout the project. The longest piece transported was a 35-meter crane bridge. The two alternators for the plant were transported from Vouvry in 5 and 3 days, respectively.

Nearly 500 individuals were employed on the construction site, including 220 engaged in civil engineering work. René Vittone, the project's architect, indicated that the workers represented 22 different nationalities. All were supervised by a single site manager who resided on-site, with the construction barracks being repurposed from the Grande-Dixence dam construction. Excavation of the site commenced during the winter of 1963-1964, with a total of 120,000 cubic meters of terrain excavated, including 65,000 cubic meters of rock. In April, the first foundations were poured. The 120-meter-high chimney stack was constructed using a slip form—a mold that is slid along the wall as it is constructed—from July 17 to August 26, at a rate of 3 meters per day. The intensive use of metal frames and prefabricated parts allowed for the rapid construction of the main building, which was completed in November.

The technical equipment for the boilers, the machine room, and the control building was assembled in a workshop between February 1964 and May 1965. Assembly work commenced a month later, with the completion and commissioning of the plant's first production unit in September. The second unit became operational in November 1967. The total cost of the plant's construction was 215 million francs (equivalent to 757 million in 2024).

=== Operations (1965-1999) ===
==== Production ====
Fuel consumption from 1965 to 1999.

Power generation from 1965 to 1999.

Estimated CO_{2} emissions from 1965 to 1999.

Price of heavy fuel oil in Switzerland from 1967 to 1987. (Note: Incomplete data.)

Although the plant was designed to meet winter consumption needs, in the early 1970s, it operated from September to May — or even June — to meet increased electricity demand. During this period, the production units were rarely shut down, with maintenance performed during the year-end holidays, Easter, and the three to four summer months when they were not in operation. The units could operate for up to 6,000 hours per year, consuming nearly 400,000 tonnes of heavy fuel oil to generate 1.8 terawatt-hours (TWh) of electricity.

The first oil crisis of 1973 resulted in a surge in fuel prices, with the price per barrel rising from $3 to $15. This led to a reduction in Chavalon's production, with the operational capacity of the production units limited to 4,000 to 5,000 hours per year, generating 1.35 TWh annually and supplying approximately 300,000 tonnes of fuel.

Following the second oil crisis in 1979, the plant's operating costs increased significantly, resulting in 14 million Swiss francs annual losses. The price of a barrel was $35. Production was slowed and only used to cover winter consumption peaks. Consequently, the plant's shareholders accelerated the depreciation of the installations and limited maintenance and revisions. On July 2, 1999, EOS announced that the plant would be decommissioned once the fuel reserves were depleted. At that time, the site employed 72 people, and it was estimated that production would cease between December 1999 and spring 2000. With the staff already laid off, the stock was quickly burned in September 1999 as a precautionary measure, and the plant was officially closed that same month. During its operational lifetime, the plant produced approximately 21.5 terawatt-hours (TWh) of electricity.

==== Working conditions ====
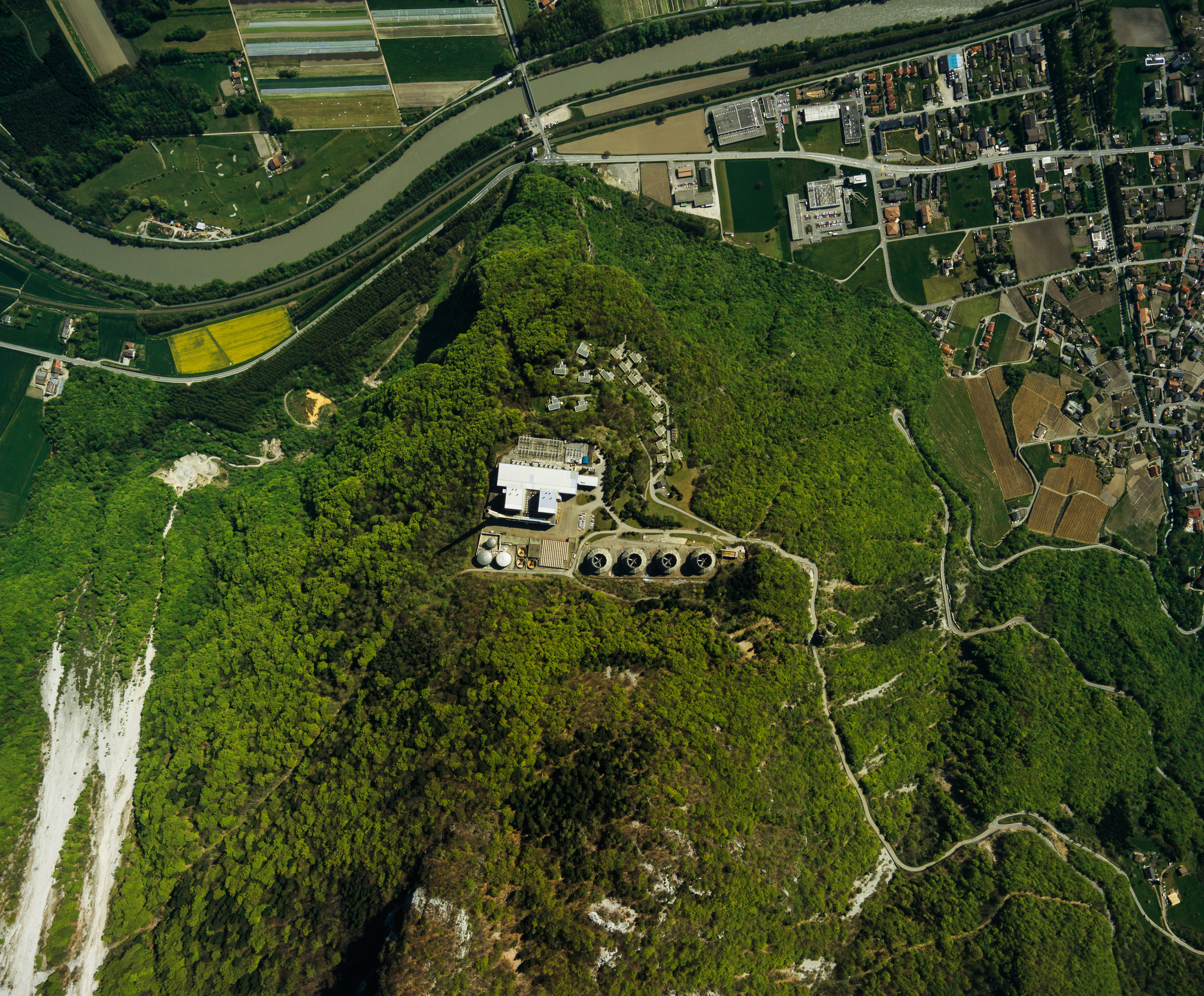
The Chavalon plant and the village of Vouvry seen from above in 1995.

Chavalon, the sole oil-fired thermal power plant in Switzerland, employed a workforce that had undergone training provided by Électricité de France (EDF). This training is conducted at a French thermal power plant for one year, during which time the employees attend courses at EDF's training center. As a result, the plant's staff were qualified in electricity, chemistry, and mechanics, and employees rotated constantly to monitor the plant, which generally operated for 24 hours a day.

During the entire operational period of the plant, employees were permitted to reside with their families at Chavalon. As the villas were allocated to different occupational groups, an employee who changed positions was also required to relocate. Managers were obliged to reside on-site. Some workers, however, resided in Vouvry, and a bus served as a shuttle for them in the morning and evening. Families had access to the cable car at all times, which operated like an elevator. To attend school, a driver collected the children each morning before transporting them by cable car to their educational institution. Roland Fontana, a Chavalon operations agent between 1967 and 1999, noted that "living on-site gave the impression of never leaving work", yet the living environment was "pleasant".

=== Reassignment projects ===
Following the plant closure, several proposals for its reuse were put forth. The municipality of Vouvry proposed the creation of an energy museum, while EOS initially considered selling portions of the plant to Turkey. In 2001, the cantonal police stored 35 million Swiss francs worth of seized hemp from Bernard Rappaz in the plant's buildings. When Sion was proposed as the host city for the 2026 Winter Olympics, a proposal later rejected by the Valaisan people, the Collombey refinery site was initially proposed for an Olympic village. Chavalon could have complemented this project. Finally, Chavalon was used as a set for television shows or photo shoots, and its chimney also served as a launch pad for base jumpers.

In parallel with the site's closure, a project has been planned for the construction of a new natural gas combined cycle power plant at Chavalon. It is anticipated that the plant will produce between 2 and 3 terawatt-hours (TWh) of electricity per year, with emissions of 750,000 tons of carbon dioxide (CO_{2}). The project, which was subject to a public inquiry in 2007, two years after the Kyoto Protocol came into effect, was deemed "outdated and obsolete" by Marie-Thérèse Sangra, the secretary of WWF for the canton of Valais. Despite this assessment, the construction permit was still granted in 2009, but the project remained stuck for several years in the cantonal court. In the same year, a project to clean up the plant was initiated, primarily to remove asbestos from the site. In 2017, EOS and Romande Energie officially announced the project abandonment, stating that the low electricity prices, coupled with the increased costs of CO2 emission compensation, do not ensure the plant's profitability. That same year, the plant was subsequently purchased by the Orllati group, a company active in real estate and demolition. The Orllati group's primary interest appears to be in the 17 villas, despite the site's classification as an industrial park. Véronique Diab-Vuadens, the president of Vouvry, has stated that the municipality is not interested in pursuing a real estate project at Chavalon. However, a considerable portion of the plant remains intact, except for the office furniture, which was not relocated.

In 2022, the Chavalon site was once again identified as a potential gas plant among 17 other sites intended to mitigate the risk of an electricity shortage in Switzerland. These reserve plants, utilizing existing infrastructure, are scheduled for completion by 2025 or 2026.

== Description ==
=== Architecture ===
==== Main building ====
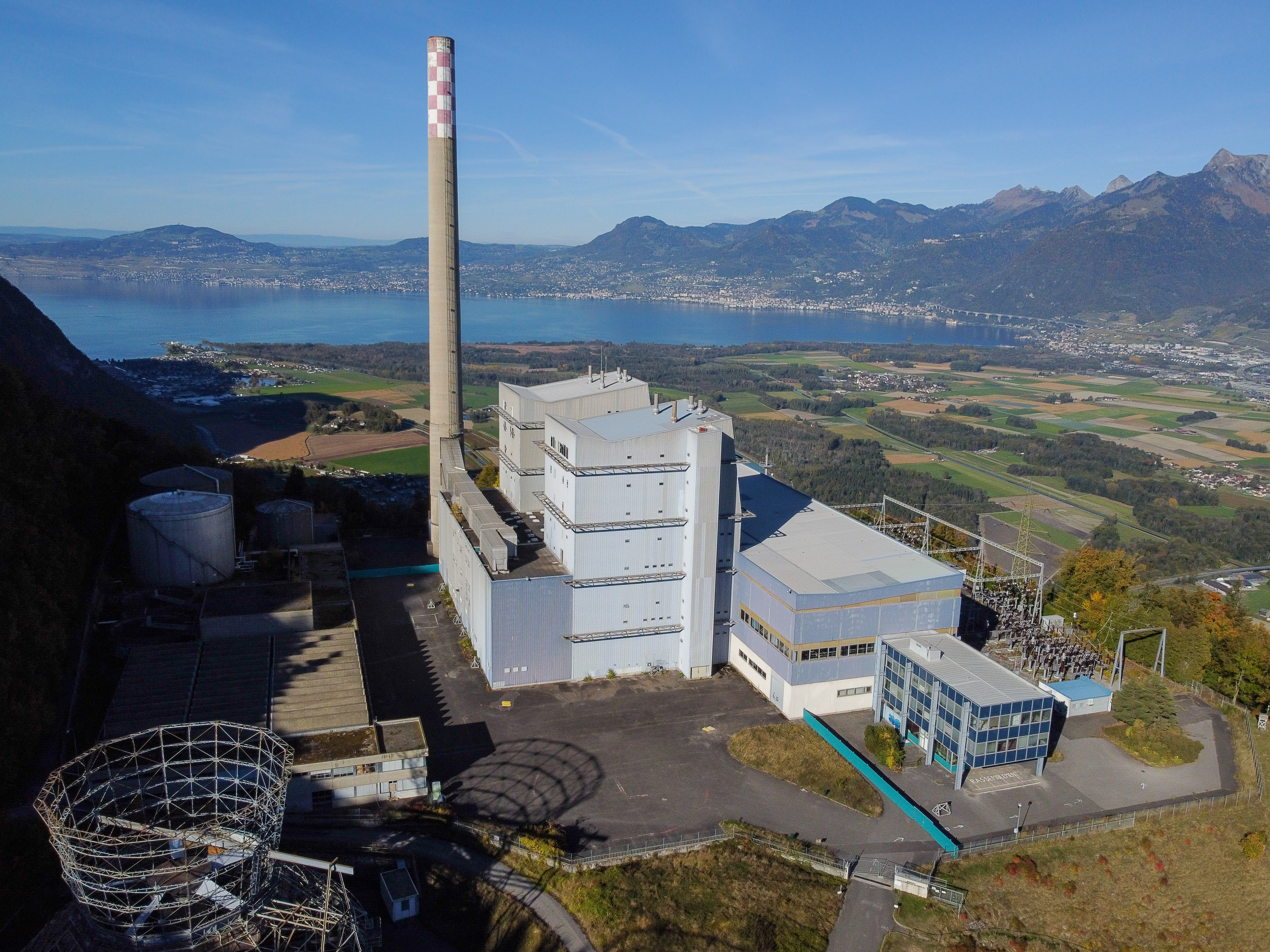
View of the main building in front of Lake Geneva in 2021.

Chavalon buildings: Workshops and stores Main building Administration offices Boilers Chimney Cable car departure Purification station 220 kV transformation station Fuel storage Cooling towers Circulation water treatment Villas

The plant's principal edifice encompasses all the energy generation infrastructure, including the boilers, the machine room, and the control room. The concrete foundation slab is connected between the different parts of the building. The two alternators are placed on a concrete slab measuring 35 meters by 13 meters with a thickness of 3.2 meters at a height of 9 meters, supported by 160 anti-vibration springs. With the machines, this slab weighs nearly 2,800 tons.

The dimensions of the disparate rooms allow the primary structure to be discerned from Bex to Vevey. The two boilers are 45 meters in height, 33 meters in length, and 27 meters in width, while the machine room is 105 meters in length, 30 meters in width, and 24 meters in height. The construction of the building's frame involved the use of 2,200 tons of steel, (Note: Boiler frame: approx. 680 t; boiler bonnet: approx. 330 t; engine room: approx. 940 t; operating building: approx. 350) with an additional 50 tons of powder-coated aluminum sheets applied to the exterior. These sheets, with a thickness ranging from 0.7 to 1 millimeter, exhibited varying profiles depending on the location, including sinusoidal, triangular, and trapezoidal designs. An additional frame termed the "hood" encircles the boiler and its frame, protecting it from wind and precipitation. Contact points between the boiler frames and their hoods are constructed with flexible elements that accommodate deformation.

The chimney, 120 meters in height, is conical in shape, with an external diameter of 8.5 meters at the base and 5.9 meters at the summit. It is supported by a reinforced concrete disk 16 meters in diameter and 2.2 meters in width. Its design allows for the expulsion of fumes between 115 and 155 °C.

The operational building, situated adjacent to the main building, serves as the administrative hub of the facility. Its five-story structure is composed of 350 tons of steel and has reinforced concrete floors poured on-site. The blue coloration of select portions of the building was deliberately chosen to contrast with the surrounding natural environment and to accentuate the plant's silhouette against the sky.

==== Housing ====
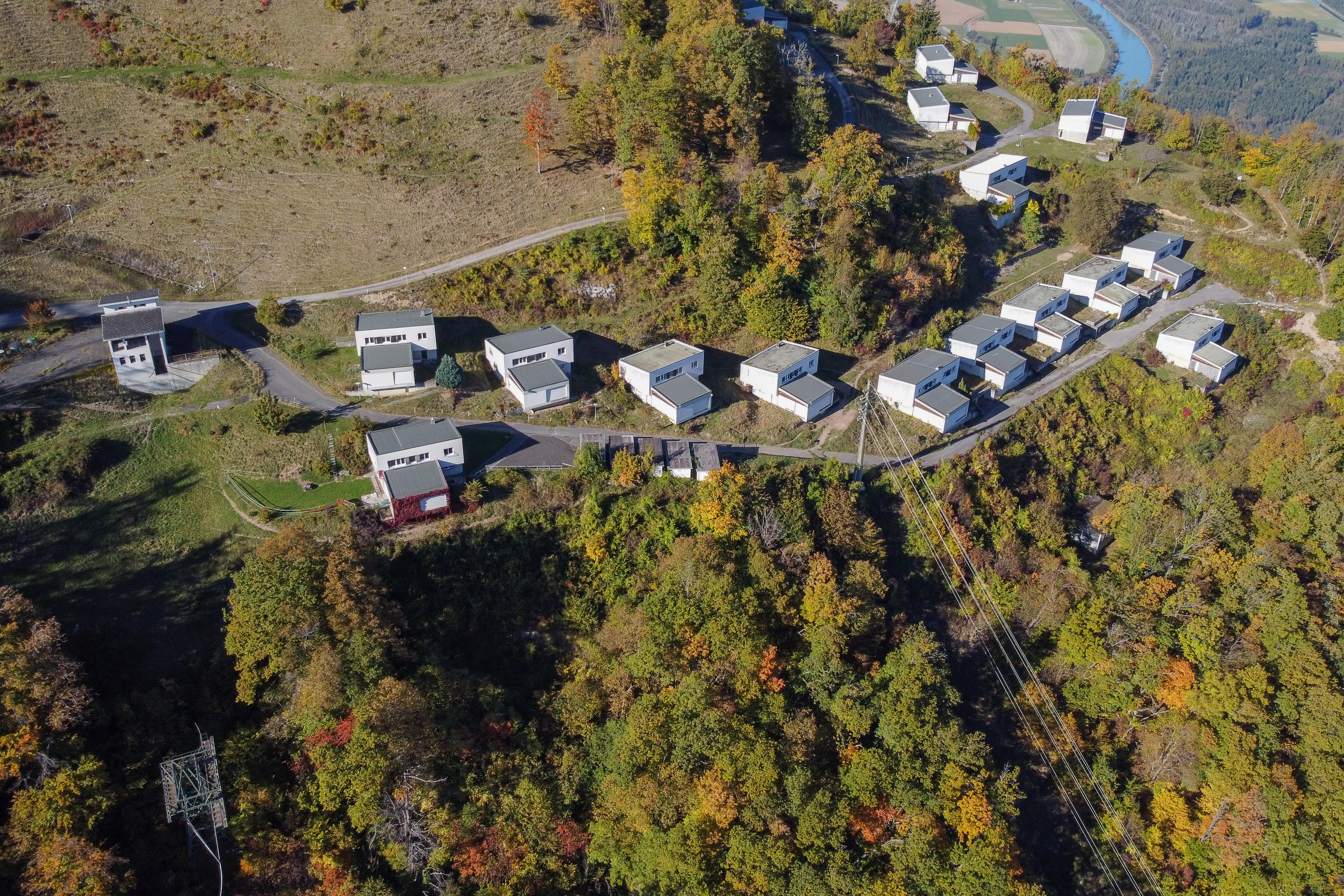
Chavalon villas and cable car in 2021.

A residential area was constructed below the plant because, to operate continuously, its employees had to be able to react quickly to any potential problems. Its location was chosen due to the lack of space on the Chavalon site, but also to minimize disturbances from the plant's operation. Its southwest orientation is also ideal, offering a panorama of the Vaud Alps. The neighborhood is divided into three distinct groups for 17 villas. To the north, the five most spacious and farthest apart villas were reserved for engineers and the director, while the seven central villas were intended for technicians. The third group, to the south, was for foremen, with the first house in the subdivision being occupied by a caretaker.

All the villas were constructed according to a uniform architectural plan, comprising a ground floor and a single-story structure. The entrance cloakroom, kitchen, living room, dining room, and playroom are all situated on the ground floor, while the bedrooms, bathroom, and wardrobe are located on the first floor. The orientation of the building is southward, allowing for the natural light to penetrate the interior. The villas of the engineers and the director also feature an integrated garage. The former garages of the foremen are situated to the south of the neighborhood, while the former garages of the technicians are located beneath the terraces of the houses.

The villa construction utilized reinforced concrete masonry, with the walls covered in plaster, except for the basements and the rear of the ground floor, where the concrete is exposed. The exterior cladding was crafted from mahogany, with particular attention paid to the large windows and gables. Each villa was equipped with a garden and a complete kitchen, as well as automatic regulation heating and a washing machine.

Following the closure of the plant, the majority of the garden trees were felled to prevent the plot from becoming a forest area. In addition, the windows and mahogany joinery were removed from the buildings. Despite the villas being rented for five years after the closure, 15 of them have been abandoned since. The two villas that were subsequently utilized served the plant's administration and a Vouvry retirement home as a tea room.

=== Equipment ===
==== Thermal ====
===== Pipeline =====
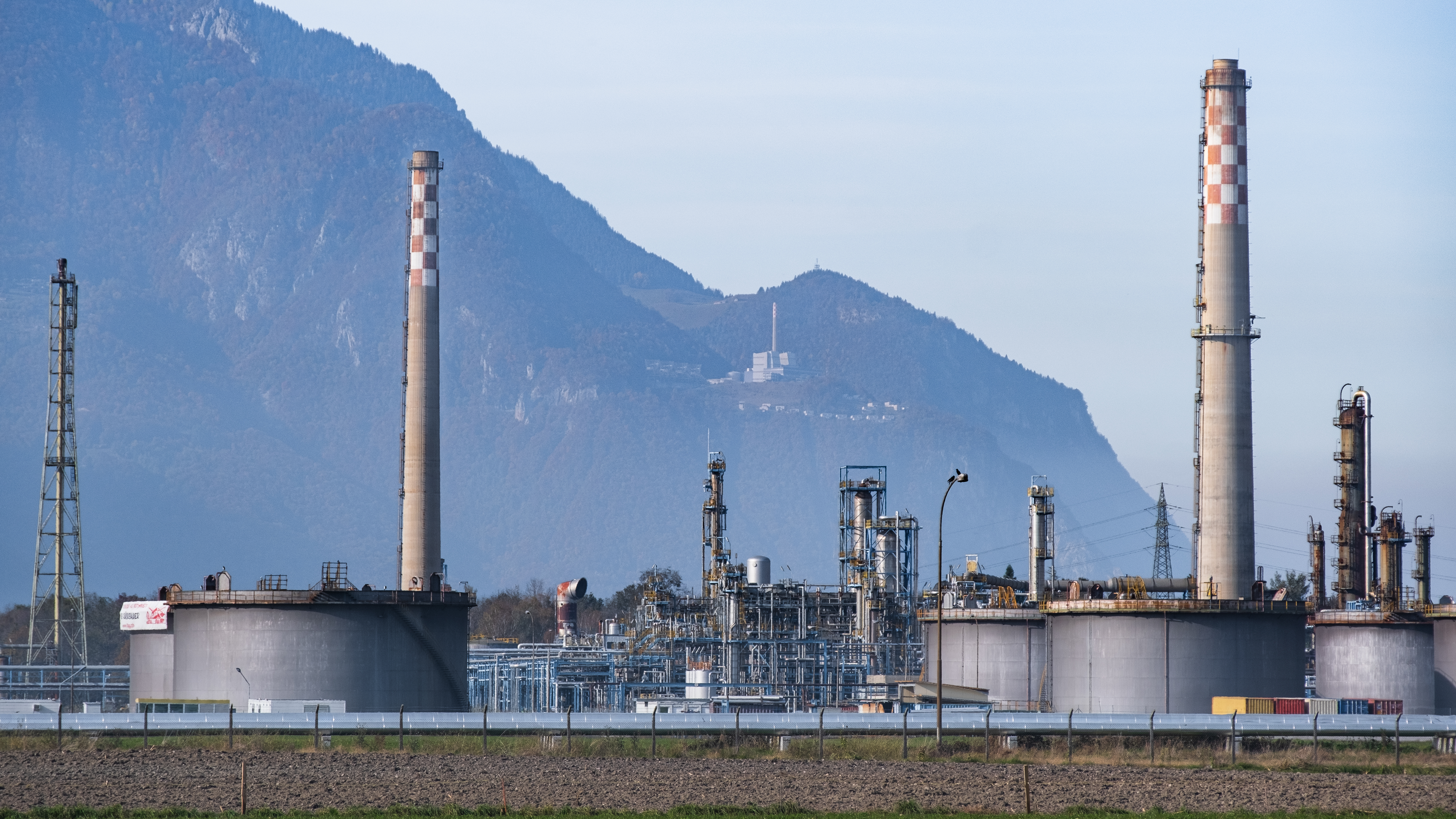
The Chavalon plant (in the background) as seen from the Collombey refinery in 2021.

The liquid fuels utilized for the electricity generation were conveyed to the facility via a pipeline. The pipeline covered a distance of 10.5 kilometers with a height difference of 460 meters. From the Collombey refinery, the pipeline followed the Bras-Neuf canal before traversing the Stockalper Canal to Vouvry, where it joined a second pumping station before ascending to the plant. The section of the pipeline located in the plain is buried for a distance of 9.3 kilometers. The remainder of the pipeline is exposed, with the ascent parallel to the wastewater and makeup water pipes pumped from the Stockalper canal. The pipeline's nominal flow rate was 65 tons per hour, although it could support up to 100 tons per hour.

The piping is composed of two concentric tubes, with the inner tube constructed from steel. The outer glass and bitumen coating serve to protect the tube from soil attacks. The pipeline's thermal expansion is absorbed by 54 compensators located in sealed pits. The pumping stations are equipped with two-stage centrifugal pumps, with the first station's heating ensured by a steam circuit and the second by heating cables. Their electrical equipment is also made with explosion-proof material. A temperature of 90 to 100 °C is necessary for the pipeline to operate. The heating of the pipes, which takes three hours, is done using medium-heavy fuel. Finally, the pipeline is equipped with a leak detection system, and the two pumping stations can be monitored from the plant.

Upon arrival on-site, the heavy fuels were deposited in two 5,000 cubic meter tanks, while the light fuels were stored in a 1,500 cubic meter tank, which was used to start the plant. Each tank was equipped with a level indicator, a maximum level alarm, and heaters.

===== Steam generator =====
The two boilers at the plant were manufactured by the Swiss company Sulzer. They are of the once-through type with forced circulation. Their walls are lined with tubes through which water flows. The boilers consumed, on average, 32 tons of heavy fuel oil per hour to produce 460 tons of steam per hour at 540°C and 19 bars.

In the water-steam circuit, water entered the boiler circuit, designated as the evaporator, and was heated until vaporization occurred. At the evaporator outlet, the saturated steam was directed to a separator, which removed blowdown water, impurities, and salts concentrated in the steam. The separator is considered particularly useful for recycling condensed water during boiler startup. At the separator outlet, the steam was directed through a superheater before being split into two equal flows and passed through three additional superheaters. The steam was then conveyed to the turbine for the first time, in its high-pressure compartment, before returning to the boiler. There, the steam passed through a concentric tube heat exchanger, designated as the "Triflux." Subsequently, the high-pressure steam was circulated within the inner tube, while the medium-pressure steam was reheated by the fuel and the high-pressure tube. This process enabled the steam to be reheated to 540°C, which was then conveyed to the medium-pressure section of the turbine.

The cooling water was pumped from the Stockalper Canal and then circulated in a closed circuit upon arrival at Chavalon. There, the steam from the turbine circuit was condensed before being cooled by the cooling towers.

The combustion process requires the input of air, which was collected by two fans. One is situated outside the boiler building, while the other is located within the boiler building itself. The collected air was heated to a temperature of 290°C in two water heaters and then two rotary air heaters. At this point, the heated air was mixed with the combustion gas. The resulting mixture was then transported to the burners, where it was sprayed with fuel oil and burned. The temperature of the emitted gases could reach up to 1,500°C. The heat released was partially dispersed by radiation in the chamber walls, while the remaining heat was carried by combustion gas to the remainder of the boiler, where it was transferred by convection. Once the gas had released all of its heat, it was drawn by two fans towards the plant's chimney.

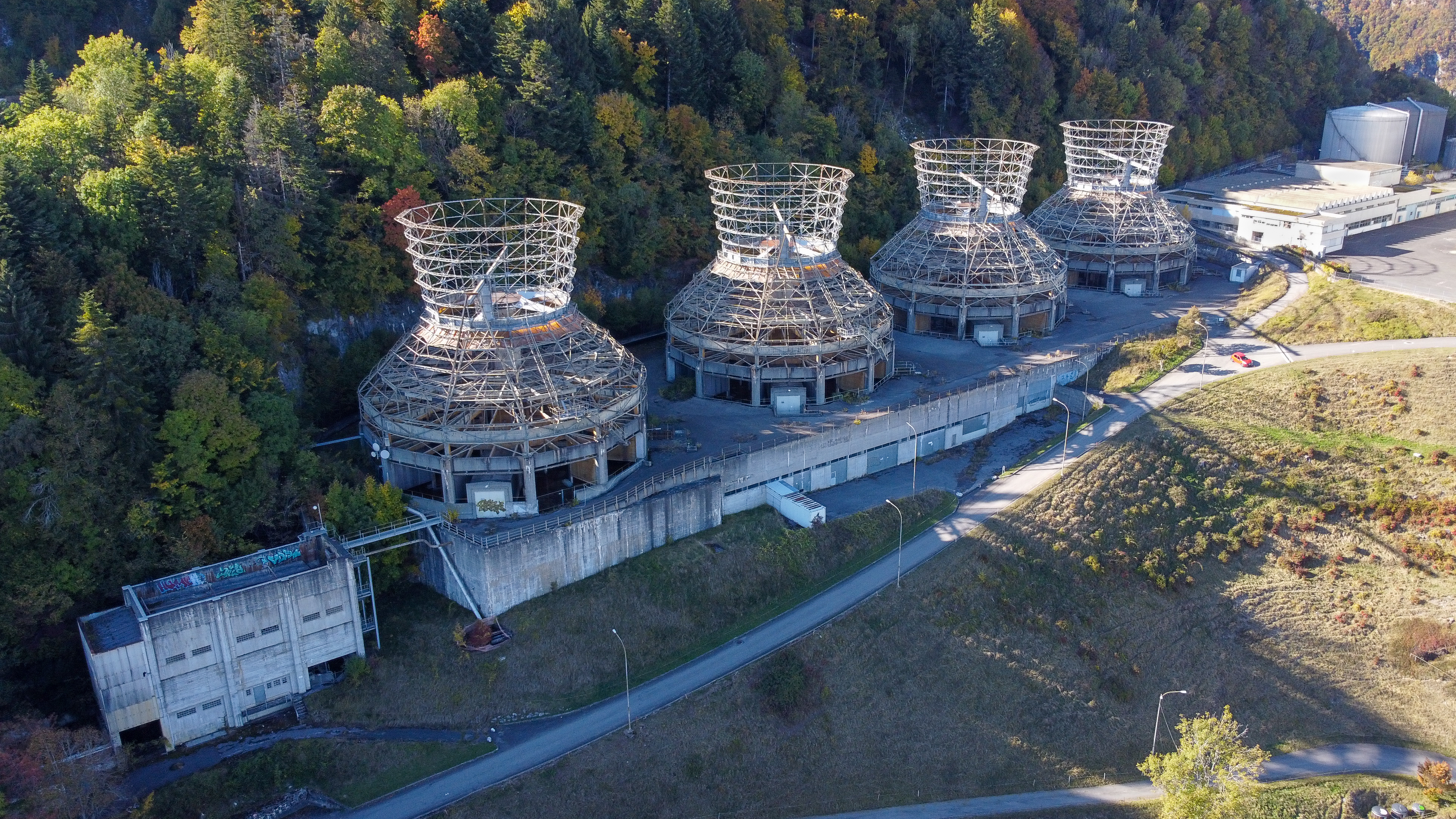
The Chavalon cooling towers in 2021.

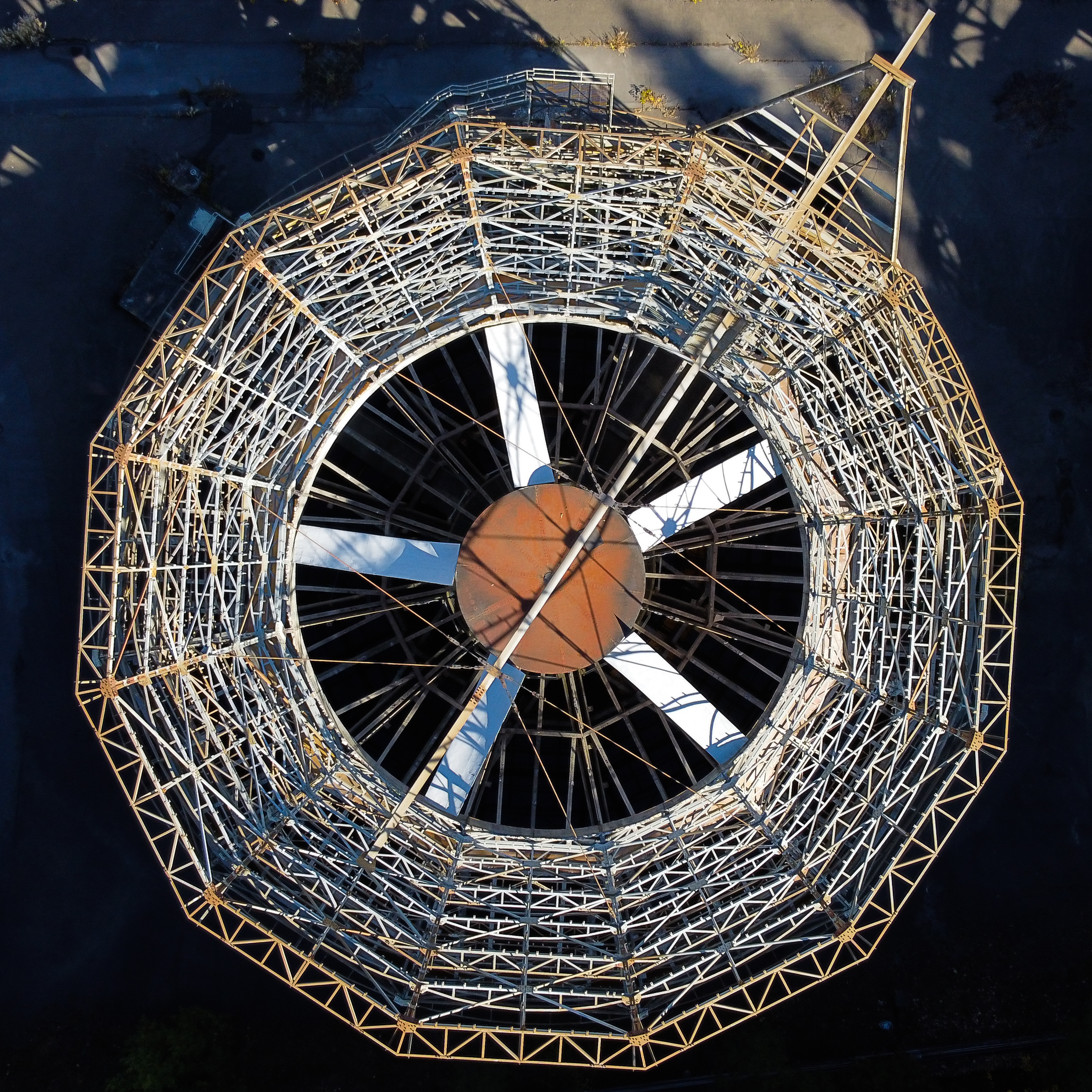
Top view of one of the Chavalon cooling towers in 2021.

==== Electrical ====
The Chavalon plant employed a turbine-alternator system to transform thermal energy from oil combustion into electrical energy. The plant was equipped with two production units, each comprising a boiler, turbine, alternator, and transformer. This configuration allowed the plant to operate at half capacity in the event of equipment failure.

The alternators had a nominal voltage of 14.5 kilovolts, a rotation speed of 3,000 revolutions per minute, and a frequency of 50 hertz. They were manufactured by the Swiss company Escher Wyss. The stator's magnetic part consists of laminated sheets separated by struts. The gaps between the sheets allow for hydrogen cooling, with sealing ensured by oil seals. The rotor was constructed from a single-piece steel body encased in a bare wire winding, held in place by insulating wedges. Rotary cooling was provided by two fans on either end of the mechanical shaft, facilitating hydrogen circulation between the conductors. Each alternator's exciter operated at 1,800 revolutions per minute, utilizing a mechanical gear reducer. Consequently, its power output was 725 kilowatts at 500 volts. Additionally, the alternators were equipped with voltage regulators for the rapid shutdown of the system in the event of an overvoltage or short circuit.

The voltage was elevated to 245 kilovolts for each unit by three single-phase transformers manufactured by the Geneva company Sécheron. The connection between the alternator and the transformers is established using an aluminum busbar set with a surface area of 11,000 mm², which allowed for a maximum electrical current of 7,800 amperes per phase. The busbar connections were made with flexible braided copper conductors.

The transformers are connected to the Swiss electrical grid via a 220-kilovolt line that joins the section from Chamoson to Romanel-sur-Lausanne. The line conductors have a section of 550 mm² and are made of aluminum. The line is protected by high-voltage circuit breakers with a breaking capacity of 11,500 megavolt-amperes.

==== Principle diagram ====
Schematic diagram of the power.

== See also ==
- Electricity sector in Switzerland
- Energy in Switzerland

== Bibliography ==
- "Numéro spécial sur la Centrale thermique de Vouvry". Bulletin Technique de la Suisse Romande (in French). 92 (92). Lausanne: Société Anonyme du Bulletin technique de la Suisse romande: 105–140. 1966. Archived from the original on July 6, 2024.:
  - Manfrini, Émile (1966). "La Suisse romande et l'énergie thermique". Numéro spécial sur la Centrale thermique de Vouvry: 105–106.
  - Babaïantz, Christophe (1966). "D'Aigle à Chavalon en passant par la Porte-du-Scex". Numéro spécial sur la Centrale thermique de Vouvry: 106–109.
  - Masson, René (1966). "Les travaux de génie civil de la Centrale thermique de Vouvry". Numéro spécial sur la Centrale thermique de Vouvry: 109–113.
  - Peter, R. W (1966). "L'équipement thermique de la Centrale de Vouvry". Numéro spécial sur la Centrale thermique de Vouvry: 114–125.
  - Kaelin, Jean-Martin (1966). "L'équipement électrique de la Centrale thermique de Vouvry". Numéro spécial sur la Centrale thermique de Vouvry: 125–128.
  - Vittone, R; Décoppet, A (1966). "Rôle de l'architecte dans l'étude et la réalisation de la Centrale thermique de Vouvry". Numéro spécial sur la Centrale thermique de Vouvry: 128–131.
  - Serrex, Jean; Berrut, Albert (1966). "Le quartier d'habitation du personnel-cadre". Numéro spécial sur la Centrale thermique de Vouvry: 132–133.
  - Bergier, P (1966). "Les constructions métalliques de la Centrale thermique de Vouvry". Numéro spécial sur la Centrale thermique de Vouvry: 133–137.
- Jaques, Emanuelle (2017). Chavalon : Un système d'infrastructures de la modernité dans le Chablais (in French). Lausanne: EPFL. Archived from the original on June 3, 2023.
- Taralle, Marcelle (1991). Chavalon (in French). Illustrated by Charles Page. Lausanne: Marendaz. Archived from the original on March 1, 2022.
- Centrale thermique de Vouvry SA (1988). Centrale thermique de Chavalon : 1962-1988 (in French). Archived from the original on March 11, 2022.
- Centrale thermique de Chavalon (in French). Lausanne: Bron-Marendaz Imprimeurs. 1995. Archived from the original on July 6, 2024.
- Usine de Chavalon : laboratoire (in French). Monthey: Montfort SA. 1983. Archived from the original on April 1, 2022.
