= Collombey refinery =

Former oil refinery in Collombey-Muraz, Switzerland

Collombey Refinery
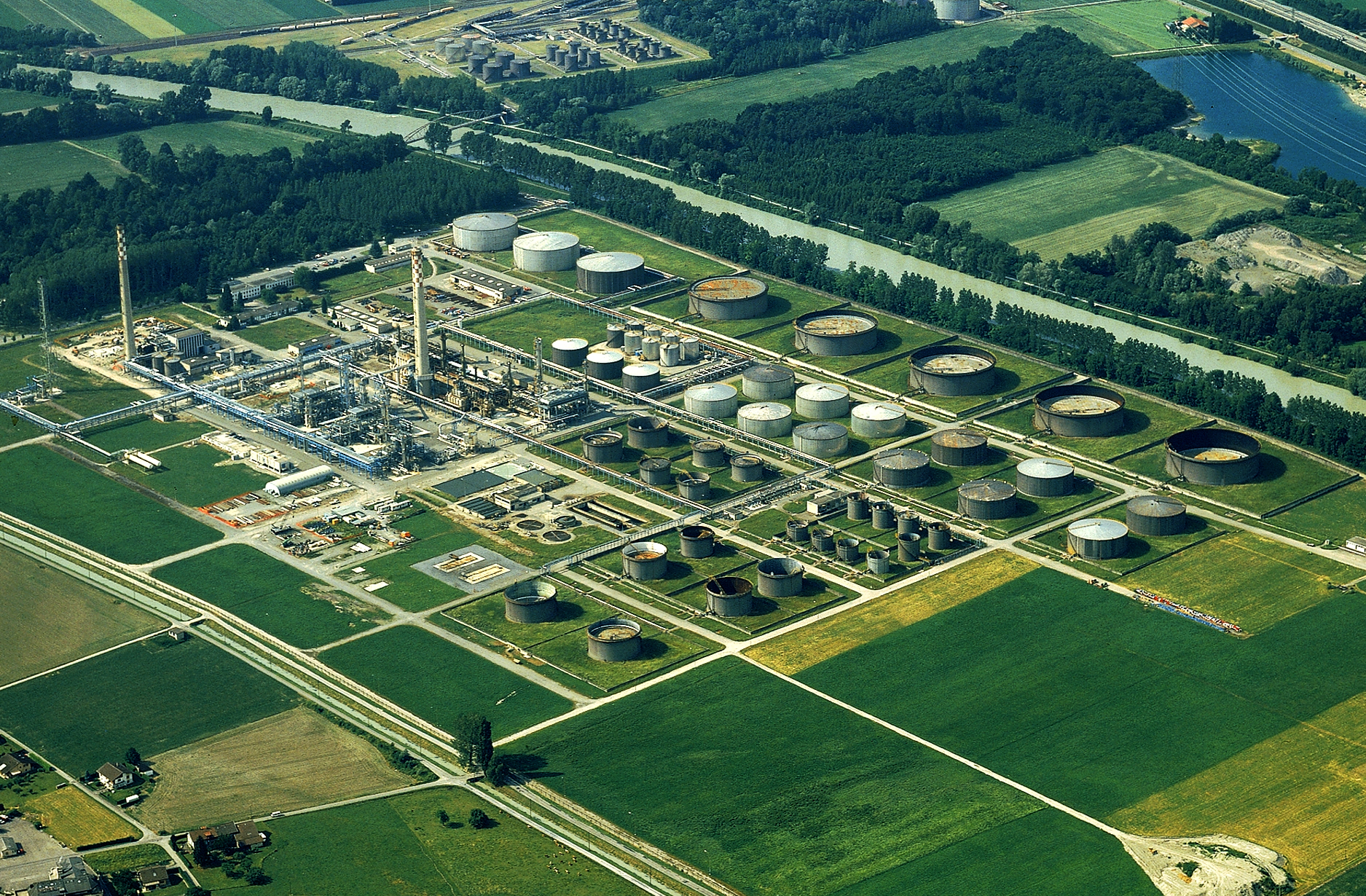
- Industry: Oil refinery
- Founded: 1963
- Defunct: 2015
- Headquarters: Collombey-Muraz, Canton of Valais, Switzerland
- Products: Unleaded petrol (95 and 98), kerosene, diesel, light fuel oil, heavy fuel oil, liquefied gas
- Owner: Tamoil (at closure)
- Parent: Eni (1963–1990), Tamoil (1990–2015)

The Collombey Refinery was an oil refinery located in the municipality of Collombey-Muraz, in the Canton of Valais, Switzerland. Constructed by the Italian energy company Eni, it operated from 1963 to 2015 and was owned by Tamoil at the time of its closure.

Crude oil was transported from the port of Genoa via the Rhône pipeline, which crosses the Alps. Finished products were distributed by rail and tank truck. The loading station, located across the Rhône in the Canton of Vaud, had a capacity to handle approximately 150 railcars and 200 tank trucks daily.

The refinery produced unleaded petrol (95 and 98 octane), kerosene, diesel, light and heavy fuel oil, and liquefied gas. It also supplied fuel to the Vouvry thermal power plant.

== Geography ==
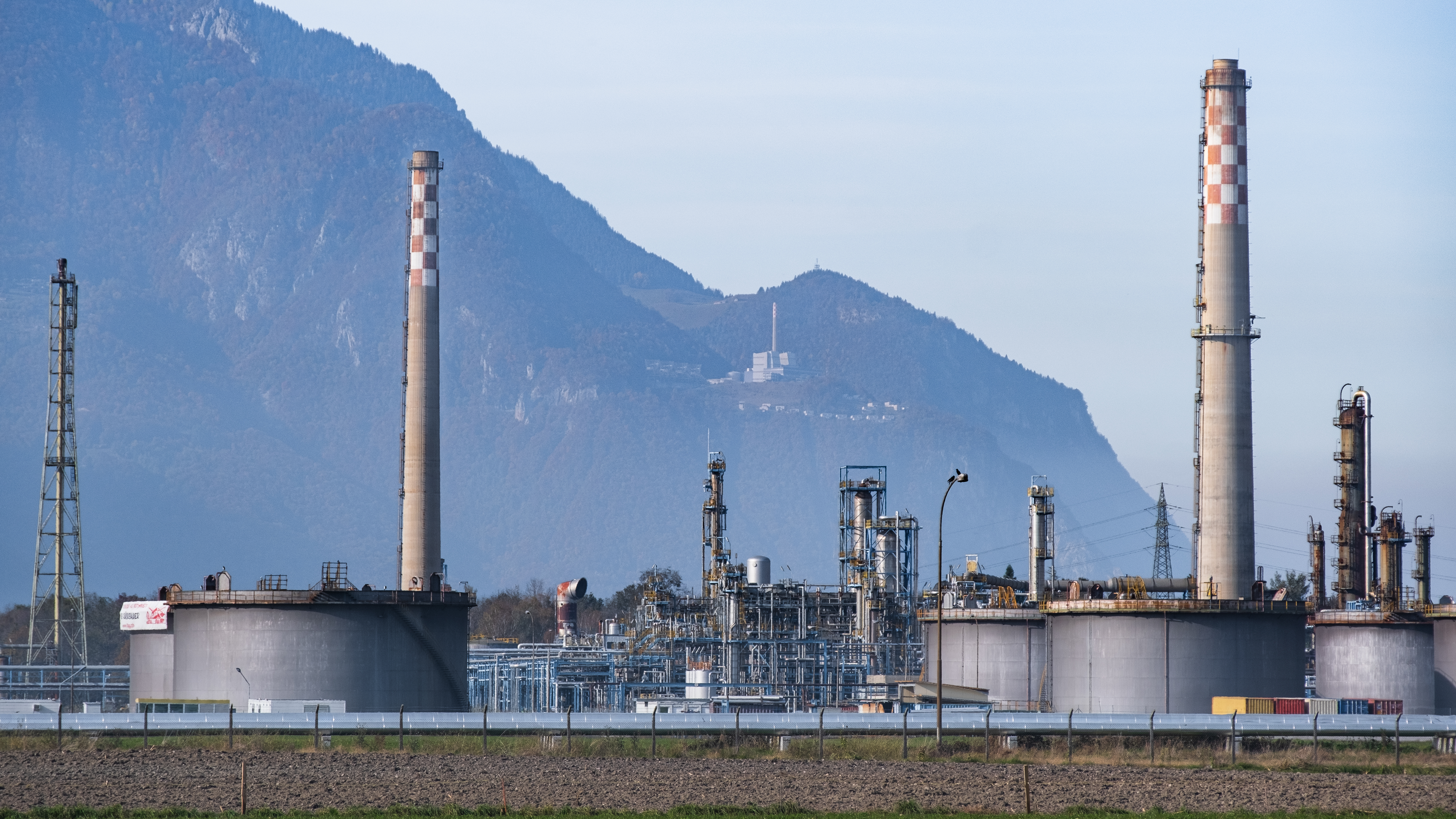
The Collombey Refinery in 2021, with the Vouvry thermal power plant in the background.

The refinery was situated southeast of Lake Geneva in the Chablais region, within the municipality of Collombey-Muraz in the Canton of Valais, approximately 100 kilometres (62 mi) from Geneva. The processing and power generation units were located on the left bank of the Rhône, while the loading station was on the right bank. The refinery’s industrial zone spanned 80 hectares (200 acres) in Collombey-Muraz. A pipeline bridge crosses the Rhône, connecting storage tanks on both sides.

The loading station, covering 50 hectares (120 acres) in the municipality of Aigle in the Canton of Vaud, was accessible via the Simplon railway and a road crossing the Grand Canal over the Refinery Bridge, passing under the A9 motorway south of Aigle. Two nearby motorway entrances facilitated access. The loading station featured eight truck loading bays, three railcar loading bays, and one gas loading bay. The refinery’s internal railway network extended 8 kilometres (5.0 mi).

The total storage capacity of the refinery and loading station was 760,000 cubic metres (27,000,000 cu ft), distributed across 90 tanks connected by a pipeline network to two pumping stations within the refinery and one at the loading station.

== History ==
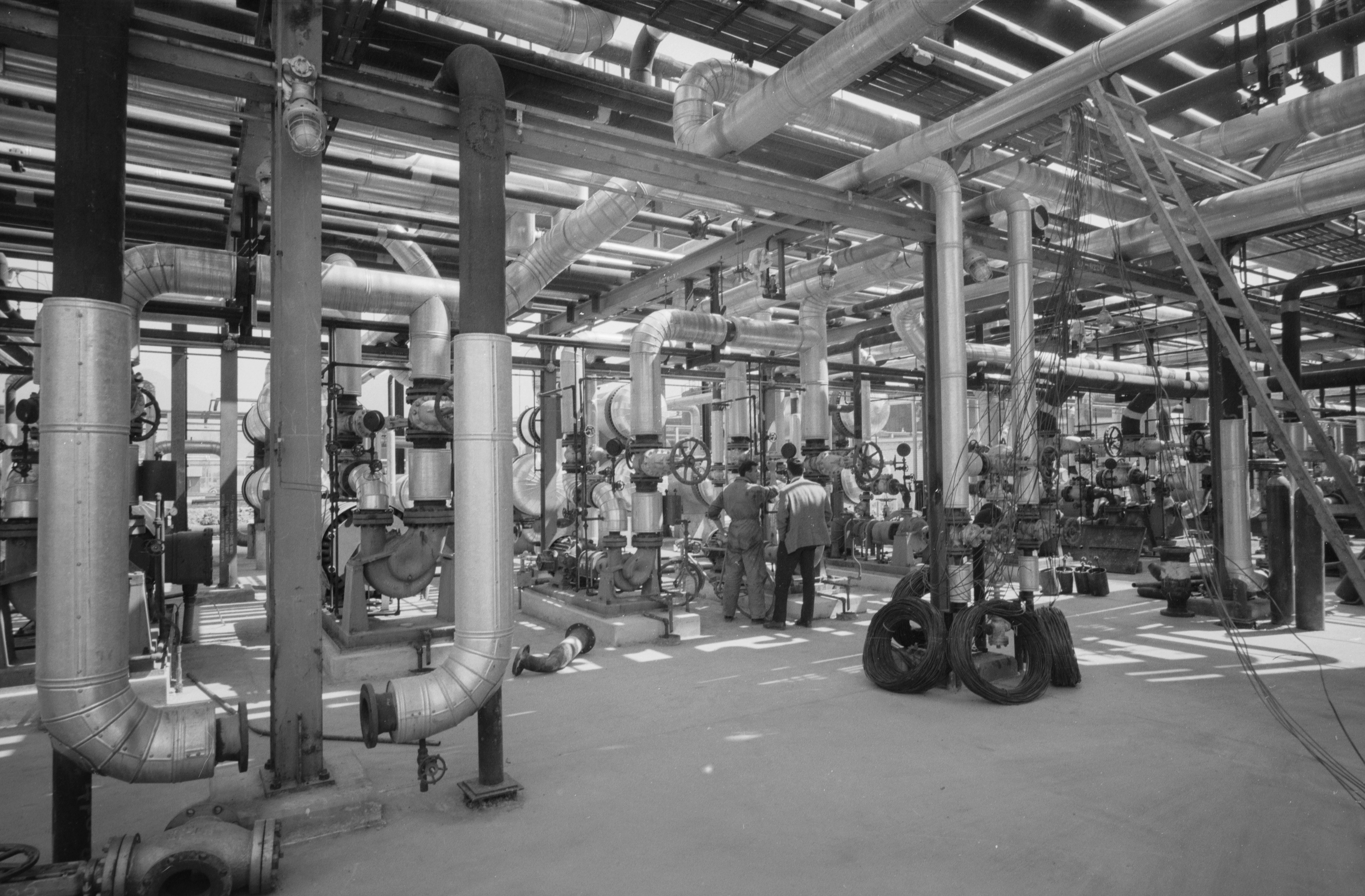
The Collombey Refinery under construction in 1963.

In 1990, the refinery was acquired by Tamoil, a subsidiary of the Libya-controlled Oilinvest group. Over 700 million Swiss francs were invested to modernize the facility.

In 2004, a catalytic cracking unit was commissioned, enabling the conversion of vacuum distillates into high-quality light products such as petrol and light fuel oil.

The refinery ceased operations in late March 2015. Negotiations with potential buyers resulted in an agreement in 2018. In May 2019, Tamoil announced the refinery’s permanent closure, with dismantling beginning in 2020. Demolition started in August 2021, beginning with the first of 54 oil storage tanks along the Rhône, led by E. Flückiger, and was scheduled to continue until autumn 2022.

== Environmental protection ==
In the early 21st century, the refinery experienced several technical incidents. The Canton of Valais assessed its environmental impact. Between 12 and 14 November 2008, 151,000 litres (33,000 imp gal; 40,000 US gal) of petrol leaked into the environment, contaminating the Rhône and nearby groundwater. The Canton of Vaud filed a complaint against Tamoil, and both Vaud and Valais authorities criticized the outdated environmental protection measures.

== Employment ==
The refinery employed over 224 people and supported additional jobs in the region by procuring local services and materials.

== Gallery ==
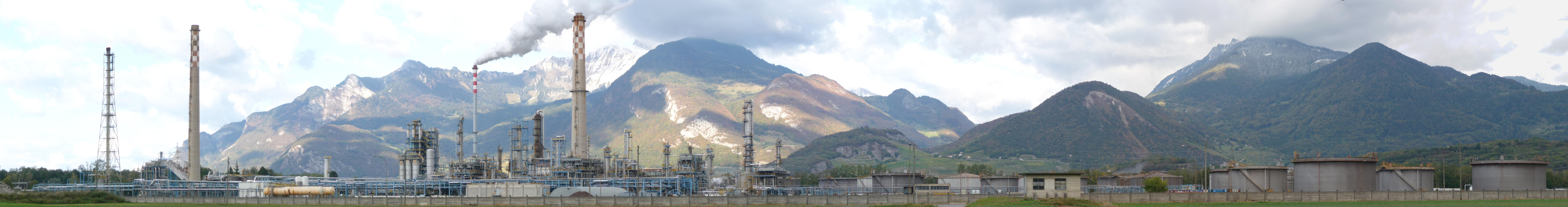
Panorama of the Collombey Refinery

== See also ==
- Oil refinery
- Tamoil
- Eni
- Chablais
- Canton of Valais
- Simplon railway
