= Electricity sector in Switzerland =

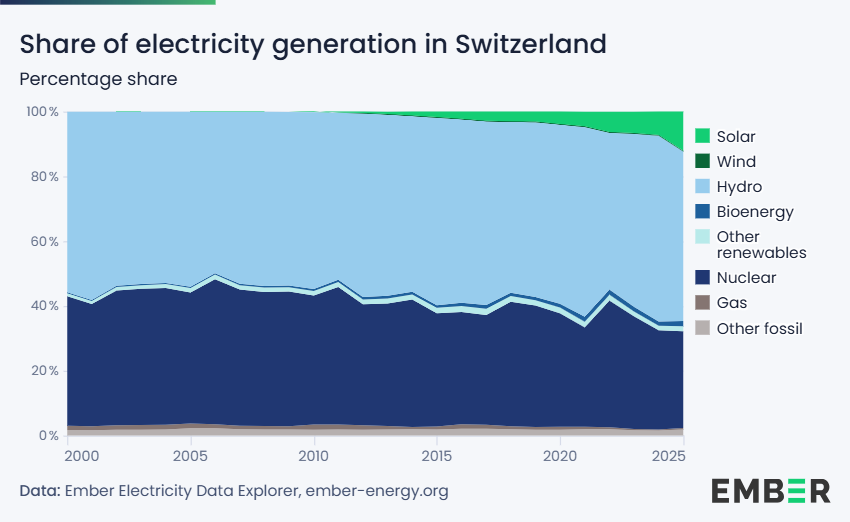
Switzerland electricity generation by source - percentage share

Swiss Electricity by Source

- Hydro Riv.: 17,000 GWh (26.6%)
- Hydro Dam: 22,600 GWh (35.3%)
- Solar PV: 2,850 GWh (4.5%)
- Wood: 675 GWh (1.1%)
- Wind: 145 GWh (0.2%)
- Waste Incin.: 2,180 GWh (3.4%)
- Nuclear: 18,500 GWh (28.9%)
Electricity sector in Switzerland, in 2021. Mostly carbon free with hydro (62%) and nuclear (29%).

The electricity sector in Switzerland relies mainly on hydroelectricity, since the Alps cover almost two-thirds of the country's land mass, providing many large mountain lakes and artificial reservoirs suitable for hydropower. In addition, the water masses drained from the Swiss Alps are intensively used by run-of-the-river hydroelectricity (ROR). The country's electricity consumption is relatively high, with 7,097 kWh per person in 2023, which is about 20% above the European Union's average for the same time period.

In 2021, net generated electricity amounted to 60.1 terawatt-hours (TWh). About 62% of Switzerland's electricity generation came from hydro, while renewables-driven and conventional thermal power plants supplied a combined contribution of 9%. Nuclear contributed 29% to the country's electricity production.

== Consumption ==
According to the IEA the electricity use (gross production + imports – exports – transmission/distribution losses) in Switzerland was in 2004 60.6 TWh, (2007) 61.6 TWh and (2008) 63.5 TWh. In 2008 Switzerland consumed electricity per inhabitant 122% compared to the European Union 15 average (9,052 / EU15: 7,409 electricity use per inhabitant 2008, kWh/person) and 133% compared to the United Kingdom (2008: UK 372.19 TWh per 59.9milj. person, and Switzerland 63,53 TWh per 7,71 milj.person).

In 2023, Switzerland's domestic electricity production reached a record 72.1 terawatt-hours (TWh), a 13.5% increase from the previous year. After accounting for 5.4 TWh consumed by storage pumps, net electricity generation stood at 66.7 TWh. Hydropower plants, including both run-of-river and storage facilities, produced 40.8 TWh—21.7% more than in 2022—contributing 56.6% to the total electricity production. Nuclear power plants generated 23.3 TWh, accounting for 32.4% of the total. The remaining 11.0% was produced by conventional thermal and renewable energy plants.

In 2023, Switzerland's final electricity consumption was 56.1 TWh, a decrease of 1.7% compared to 2022. This reduction is equivalent to the annual consumption of approximately 200,000 households. The decline occurred despite factors such as economic growth (GDP increased by 0.7%), population growth (up by 1.3%), and a 1.8% increase in heating degree days, which typically raise electricity demand.

In 2024, Switzerland's electricity consumption was 57.5 TWh, a 1.4% increase over 2023. The increase in consumption was driven mainly by higher usage and growth in households and transportation, household consumption rose to about 19.8 TWh, permanent resident population rose by 1.3%, and transport grew by 5.4%. Swissolar, the national solar association, estimates that around 6 TWh of the 2024 electricity consumption is covered by solar power, corresponding to roughly 10 % of total demand.

== Hydro power ==
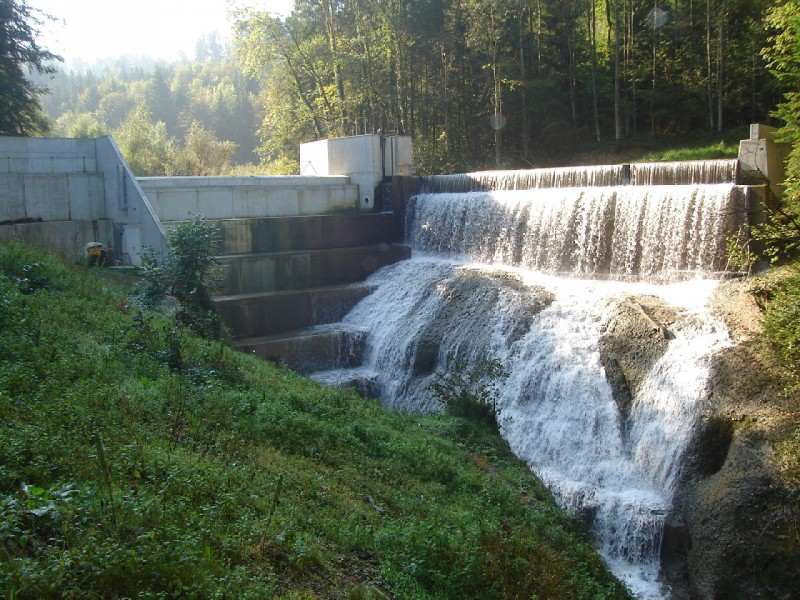
Small hydropower plant Buchholz, Switzerland

Hydroelectricity is by far the country's most important source of electricity, and contributing more than half to its electricity generation. Hydro power is generally divided into conventional hydroelectricity (using a dam) and run-of-the-river hydroelectricity. In addition, pumped-storage hydroelectricity (PSH) plays an important role in Switzerland, being used in combination with base load power plants and nuclear power from France.

In 2020, Switzerland's total installed capacity reached 22.9 GW, exceeding the peak load of 9.6 GW. Hydropower comprised 68% of this capacity, but storage capacity and water availability limited its yearly production. In 2021, hydroelectric production totaled approximately 40 TWh, factoring in 4 TWh from pump energy, and led to a net generation of 36 TWh.

=== Small hydro ===
The KEV remuneration (see below) also applies to small-scale hydro power plants with nameplate capacities up to 10 megawatts.

== Nuclear power ==
Switzerland nuclear power plants (view)
Active plants
Closed plants

As of 2026, there are four nuclear power plants, with a total of four operational reactors. In 2021, they produced 18.5 terawatt-hours (TWh) of electricity. Nuclear power accounted for 29% of the nation's gross electricity generation of 64.2 TWh In addition, there are a number of research reactors in Switzerland, one of them at the EPFL.

In 2011, the federal authorities decided to gradually phase out nuclear power in Switzerland because of the Fukushima accident in Japan. In late 2013 the operator BKW decided to cease all electrical generation in 2019 in the Mühleberg plant

As of December 8, 2014, the National Council has voted to limit the operational life-time of the Beznau Nuclear Power Plant—which houses the oldest commercial reactor in the world—to 60 years, forcing decommissioning upon its two reactors by 2029 and 2031, respectively.

In 2021, nuclear power constituted 22% of Switzerland's total energy supply (TES) and accounted for 31% of total electricity generation. Additionally, Switzerland ranked eighth among International Energy Agency (IEA) countries in terms of the proportion of nuclear power in its electricity generation mix.

== Oil power ==
From 1965 until 1999, the Chavalon plant in Valais, above the Collombey refinery, had an electrical power output of two times 142 megawatts. The refinery was shut down in 2015, and will be dismantled until 2022.

In 2021, the contribution of oil to electricity generation was minimal, accounting for just 0.05% of the total electricity produced.

== Gas power ==
A newly built gas power plant is debated to cover future power shortages during the winter. There are considerations regarding a gas turbine testing facility in Birr AG belonging to the Italian engineering firm Ansaldo Energia. The facility is connected to both the gas and the electricity grid, and when both installed turbines are running, it feeds 740 megawatts into the Swiss electricity grid.

In 2021, the contribution of natural gas to electricity generation was minimal, accounting for just 0.8% of the total electricity produced.

== Non-hydro renewables ==
=== Feed-in remuneration at cost (KEV) ===
The federal government adopted feed-in tariffs to offer a cost-based compensation to renewable energy producers. The feed-in remuneration at cost (KEV, German: Kostendeckende Einspeisevergütung, French: Rétribution à prix coûtant du courant injecté, Italian: Rimunerazione a copertura dei costi per l'immissione in rete di energia elettrica) is the primary instrument for promoting the deployment of power systems using renewable energy sources.

It covers the difference between the production and the market price, and guarantees producers of electricity from renewable sources a price that corresponds to their production costs. The following renewable energy sources are supported by the KEV remuneration: distributed small hydro (with capacities up to 10 MW), solar photovoltaics, wind power, geothermal energy, biomass and biogas (from agriculture, waste and water treatment).

The KEV remuneration collects a surcharge on the consumed kilowatt-hour of electricity. As in other countries, industries with a large electricity consumption are exempt from the surcharge, which has gradually been increased and stands at 1.5 cents per kWh as of 2014.

The authorities have specified the remuneration tariffs for renewables based on reference power plants for each individual technology. Feed-in tariffs are applicable for 20 to 25 years, depending on the technology. In view of the anticipated technological progress and the increasing degree of market maturity of renewables energy technologies (especially for solar PV), the feed-in tariffs are subjected to a gradual reduction once or twice a year. These reductions only apply to new production facilities that are put into operation.

Planned installations of renewable power facilities have to be registered with Swissgrid, the national network operator. As of the end of 2014, a growing waiting list for solar photovoltaic systems has accumulated as demand excess the capped capacities given by the currently available funds of the KEV remuneration.

=== Wind power ===
Swiss wind power accounted for only 146 GWh or 0.2% of net-electricity production in 2019. The contribution of wind power to Switzerland's electricity supply remains modest compared to other renewables. By 2022, a total of around 87 MW of large-scale wind power capacity was in operation, generating approximately 153 GWh (~0.3 % of national demand). In 2023 output increased to about 169 GWh, with 2024 seeing around 160 GWh registered. Switzerland's long-term target under the Energy Strategy 2050 is to raise wind-generated electricity to about 4.3 TWh annually, backed by a theoretical technical potential of up to 29.5 TWh/year. Domestic expansion is challenged by topographic constraints, dense populated area, permitting, and public acceptance, but strategic planning identifies key sites in the Swiss Plateau and mountain passes as priority areas for future development. In order to hit the target set by the 2050 Energy Strategy of generating electricity from wind power to 4.3 TWh annually, a 760 wind turbines are required.

=== Solar power ===
For many years, Switzerland's pace of deploying solar PV had been lagging significantly behind its neighboring Germany and Italy. However, installed capacity of solar PV increased by 300 MW or 69% to 737 MW in 2013 and is likely to continue its strong growth due to the recently ramped up KEV funds. In 2014, another installed 320 MW brought the country beyond the gigawatt mark and the IEA-PVPS estimates the now installed capacity sufficient to supply close to 2% of the domestic electricity demands. In 2024, Switzerland added approximately 1.78 GW of new photovoltaic capacity, bringing the cumulative installed solar PV capacity to around 8.0 GW at the end of the year. Solar-generated electricity in Switzerland in 2024 accounted for about 11% of total electricity consumption (≈ 6.2 TWh) according to the International Energy Agency Photovoltaic Power Systems Programme (IEA-PVPS) country summary. The rate of growth of new installations slowed in 2024 compared to previous years, according to the Swiss solar-industry association It also anticipates no more growth to continue in 2025 and 2026. This is due to concerns surrounding the new Electricity Act. However, it predicts that it will remain stable at current levels. According to Swissolar's Solar Monitor 2025, Switzerland is projected to generate over 8 TWh of electricity from solar power in 2025, covering around 14% of the country's annual consumption. It forecasts this level of generation assuming continued deployment of around 1.5 GW of new PV capacity per year through 2027.

=== Geothermal power ===
An induced seismicity in Basel led the city to suspend a geothermal energy project and conduct a seismic hazard evaluation, which resulted in its cancellation in December 2009.

== Global warming ==
Emissions of carbon dioxide in total, per capita in 2007 were 5.6 tons CO_{2} compared to EU 27 average 7.9 tons CO_{2}.

=== Carbon dioxide emissions ===
A study published in 2009 showed that the emissions of carbon dioxide (CO_{2}) due to the electricity consumed in Switzerland (total: 5.7 million tonnes) are seven times higher than the emissions of carbon dioxide due to the electricity produced in Switzerland (total: 0.8 million tonnes).

The study also show that the production in Switzerland (64.6 TWh) is similar to the amount of electricity consumed in the country (63.7 TWh). Overall, Switzerland exports 7.6 TWh and imports 6.8 TWh; but, in terms of emissions of carbon dioxide, Switzerland exports "clean" electricity causing emissions of 0.1 million tonnes of CO_{2} and imports "dirty" electricity causing emissions of 5 million tonnes of CO_{2}.

The electricity produced in Switzerland generated 14 grammes of CO_{2} per kilowatt hour. The electricity consumed in Switzerland generated 100 grammes of CO_{2} per kilowatt hour.

== Power stations ==
A 1.6 GWh flow battery started construction in Laufenburg in 2025.

In Switzerland, there also exists a single-phase AC grid operated with 16.7 Hz for power supply of railway lines, see List of installations for 15 kV AC railway electrification in Germany, Austria and Switzerland.

== See also ==
- Electric power transmission
- Nuclear power in Switzerland
- Energy in Switzerland
- Klöntalersee
