= Induced seismicity in Basel =

Coordinates: 47.5854°N 7.5958°E

Induced seismicity in Basel led to suspension of its hot dry rock (HDR) enhanced geothermal systems project. A seismic-hazard evaluation was then conducted, resulting in the cancellation of the project in December 2009. Basel, Switzerland sits atop a historically active fault and most of the city was destroyed in a magnitude 6.5 earthquake in 1356. But the Basel project, although it had established an operational approach for addressing induced earthquakes, had not performed a thorough seismic risk assessment before starting geothermal stimulation.

Seismic events in Basel reached the trip point of Richter Magnitude M_{L} 2.9 six days after the main stimulation was started on December 2, despite precautionary reduction of the injection rate earlier that same day upon reaching earlier "soft" thresholds. However, further tremors exceeding magnitude 3 were recorded on 6 January (measuring 3.1), 16 January 2007 (3.2), and 2 February 2007 (3.2).

In all, between December 2006 and March 2007, the six borehole seismometers installed near the Basel injection well recorded more than 13,500 potential events connected with the geothermal project. The 200 largest were between magnitudes 0.7 and 3.4. Nine of these events had an M_{L} of 2.5 or larger. The remainder were too small to be observed or felt at the surface. Between December 2 and January 24, 168 seismic events with magnitude greater than 0.6 occurred within 1 km of the wellbore, at depths of 4–5 km, near the well bottom.

On 8 December 2006, only 6 days after the main stimulation started on 2 December, the HDR project in Basel was suspended when an earthquake tripped a 4-level "traffic light" scheme established for halting operations in the event of unacceptable induced earthquake occurrences. Trip points of Richter magnitudeM_{L} 2.9 and a peak ground velocity of 5 millimeters per second were established by the project as independent criteria for a "red alert" that entailed halting fluid injection and bleeding-off to minimum wellhead pressure. Lesser operational curtailments were triggered for lower magnitude and peak ground velocity thresholds.

Earlier that day, a "yellow alert"—the second level—was called at 03:06 local time after a 2.6 M_{L} event with peak ground velocity of 0.55 mm/s, which exceeded the "soft" 2.3 M_{L} and 0.5 mm/s thresholds. As a precaution, the injection rate was reduced at 04:04.

Following further events that were larger than 2.0M_{L}, a level-three "orange alert" was declared—the injection was stopped at 11:34 and the well shut-in, maintaining the pressure. However, a 2.7 M_{L} event occurred at 15:46, followed by a 3.4 M_{L} event at 16:48, and so in accordance with the response strategy, the well was bled off as soon as practicable.

The largest event prompted concern from local residents. The six borehole seismometers installed near the Basel injection well to monitor the natural background seismicity and the geothermal stimulation recorded more than 13,500 potential events connected with the geothermal project, from which 3,124 were of sufficient quality to permit [hypocenter] determinations in the period 2–12 December 2006, which spanned the main stimulation and the decline in the event rate. During the post-stimulation period from 13 December 2006 onward, a further 350 locatable events were detected up to 2 May 2007, by which time events were occurring sporadically at around one per day. In all, locations for more than 3,500 events were determined.

Of these more than 3,500 events, only the 200 largest (magnitudes between 0.7 and 3.4) were also observed by the earthquake networks of the Swiss Seismological Service and the Seismological Service of Baden-Wuerttemberg, The remainder were too small to be observed or felt at the surface. For the period through 24 January 2007, there were 168 earthquakes with magnitudes > 0.6, 15 with M_{L} > 2, and three with M_{L} > 3. All of these were within 1 km of the wellbore, and at depths between 4 and 5 km, near the well bottom. There were only 9 events with an M_{L} of 2.5 or larger in the borehole vicinity for the period through 2007. Five occurred in December 2006, two in January 2007, and one each February and March.

Damage claims arose from the largest of the events. Eventually, some 2,700 claims were processed by the project's insurer for an estimated 7 million – 9 million Swiss francs (about 6.5 million to 8.3 million U.S dollars)

Following a three-year study, the Basel HDR project canceled in December 2009. The study predicted that the town would have continued to experience small earthquakes a few times a year over the 30-year lifetime of the project. The USA soon reacted with new regulations on deep geothermal energy projects.

== See also ==
- Energy in Switzerland
- Electricity sector in Switzerland
