= Rhône Pipeline =

Oil pipeline between Italy and Switzerland

Rhone Pipeline

Location
- Country: Italy, Switzerland
- Start: Port of Genoa
- Passes through: Ferrera Erbognone, Aosta, Great St Bernard Tunnel
- To: Collombey-Muraz

General information
- Type: oil
- Partners: Tamoil
- Operator: Société de l'oléoduc du Rhône (Eni)
- Commissioned: 1959

Technical information
- Length: 340 km (210 mi)
- Maximum discharge: 1,1 million bl per year

The Rhone Pipeline (French: Oléoduc du Rhône) is a crude oil pipeline, which connects Italy and Switzerland.

== Route ==
The pipeline starts from the marine terminal in Genoa. It runs through the Alps and the Great St Bernard Tunnel to Collombey-Muraz in the Rhône Valley in the Swiss canton of Valais, where it supplies the Tamoil oil refinery at Collombey-Muraz.

== History ==
The construction of the pipeline started in 1960.

Since 2015, the oil transport has stopped due to Tamoil's decision to idle the oil refinery of Collombey-Muraz.

== Technical features ==
The diameter of the trunkline is 12 inches (300 mm) and 18 inches (460 mm) in diameter.

The capacity of the pipeline is approximately 1.1 million barrel of crude oil per year.

== See also ==
- Transalpine Pipeline

== Bibliography ==
- Ulrich P. Büchi: Die schweizerische Erdölfrage im Jahre 1968. in: Bulletin der Vereinigung Schweizerischer Petroleum-Geologen und -Ingenieure, 36, 1969, pp. 6–10.
