= Energy in Switzerland =

Energy consumption by source, Switzerland

Swiss total primary energy consumption in 2024
1. Oil (36.7%)
2. Gas (9.80%)
3. Nuclear fuel (24.3%)
4. Hydropower (16.9%)
5. Rest (12.3%)

Energy in Switzerland is transitioning towards sustainability, targeting net zero emissions by 2050 and a 50% reduction in greenhouse gas emissions by 2030.

Switzerland's energy relies mainly on hydroelectric, nuclear, and natural gas, as well as imported petroleum for cars since Switzerland produces no fossil fuels. Launched in 2011, the 2050 Energy Strategy aims to shift towards sustainable energy practices, achieving climate neutrality and reducing reliance on fossil fuels.

Energy consumption per capita in Switzerland has shown a steady decline over the years. Despite a notable population increase of 28.7% between 1990 and 2020, energy consumption decreased by 5.9% during this period. The majority of energy consumed in Switzerland is derived from petroleum and motor fuels, accounting for 43% of the total, followed by electricity at 26%, and gas at 15%. Private households and transport sectors utilize the most energy, each contributing one third, while manufacturing and services sectors each account for just under one fifth of the energy consumption.

After the Fukushima Daiichi accident in March 2011, Switzerland took significant steps regarding its nuclear energy policy. The Federal Council suspended pending procedures for new nuclear power plant licenses, and in the same year, both the Federal Council and Parliament decided to phase out nuclear energy gradually. This decision laid the groundwork for the 2050 Energy Strategy, which involves decommissioning Switzerland's five nuclear power plants as they reach the end of their operational lives, with no plans for new replacements. The country plans to phase out nuclear power plants by 2044.

In 2017, the Swiss public voted in favor of the revised Energy Act, marking the initial implementation of the 2050 Energy Strategy. Subsequently, in June 2023, the Swiss public voted in favor of the Federal Act on Climate Protection Goals, Innovation, and Strengthening Energy Security (Climate and Innovation Act). This legislation establishes a framework for Swiss climate policy, setting interim targets for reducing greenhouse gas emissions by 2050.

The Mantelerlass, passed by the Swiss parliament on September 29, 2023, aims to accelerate renewable energy development. It sets a target of 35 TWh/year from new green technologies by 2035, compared to around 6 TWh/year in 2022. This would cover about half of Switzerland's expected electricity demand in 2035, with the rest to be met by hydroelectric power and imports.

== History ==
The energy economy in Switzerland developed similarly to the rest of Europe, but with some delay until 1850. There are three different periods. An agrarian society until the mid-nineteenth century, Switzerland's small scale energy economy was based on wood and biomass (plants feeding the animal and human labour), which was in general renewable energy. Also used were wind power and hydraulic power, and, from the eighteenth century, indigenous coal.

The industrial society, from 1860 to 1950, had to import coal as it was the main source of energy but not readily available as a natural resource. Another important source of energy was water power at low or high pressure. The current consumer society, developed using mostly oil, natural gas, water power (turbines) to a lesser extent, and later nuclear energy. Compared to other countries, energy in Switzerland is characterised by an important role of water and an early development of nuclear energy.

The oil crisis and pollution of the environment prompted the increased use of renewable energy. It is notable that 100% of the Swiss railway network is electrified. The high proportion of energy generated through hydroelectric power and the lack of natural resources (such as coal and oil) help to explain why such a situation is strategically beneficial in Switzerland.

== Energy statistics ==
2020 energy statistics

Production capacities for electricity (billion kWh)
Type	Amount
Hydro	113.04
Nuclear	68.67
Biomass	9.44
Solar	7.63
Fossil fuel	1.61
Wind power	0.40
Total	200.79

Electricity (billion kWh)
Category	Amount
Consumption	56.41
Production	66.16
Import	26.99
Export	32.55

Natural Gas (billion m^{3})
Consumption	3.62
Import	3.58
Export	0.01

Crude Oil (barrels per day)
Consumption	80,300,000
Production	109,500
Import	22,230,000

CO_{2} emissions:
34.92 million tons

== Energy types ==
=== Renewable energy in Switzerland ===
Switzerland's commitment to renewable energy is outlined in the 2050 Energy Strategy. As of 2020, renewable energy accounted for 27% of total energy consumption, marking a 10% increase since 1990. While surpassing the EU average of 19%, Switzerland lags behind leaders like Sweden (60%) and Finland (44%). Hydroelectric power dominates, representing over 60% of Swiss energy, while solar power shows significant growth potential, outpacing other 'new' renewables. Notably, renewable energy predominantly powers electricity generation in Switzerland, comprising 80% of its usage.

=== Electricity ===
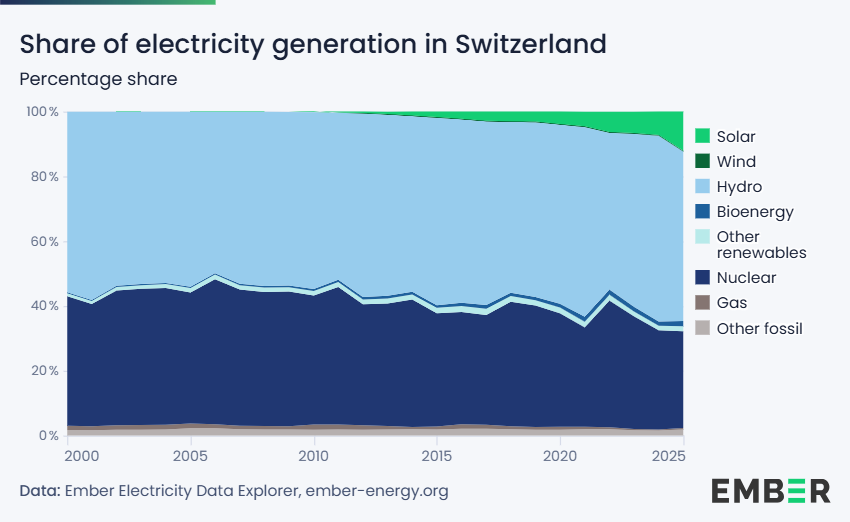
Switzerland electricity generation by source - percentage share

In 2022, Switzerland's per capita electricity consumption stood at 6.50 MWh, notably lower than Nordic countries such as Norway (21.07 MWh), Finland (13.84 MWh), and Sweden (11.71 MWh). Nevertheless, it exceeded that of neighboring countries like Germany (5.70 MWh), France (6.07 MWh), and Italy (4.87 MWh). Since 2000, Switzerland's energy consumption per capita has declined by 17%.

In 2025, Switzerland generated 67.5 TWh of electricity. Hydropower accounted for 55.5% of generation, nuclear power for 27.2%, and thermal and renewable electricity generation plants for 17.3%, including 11.8% from photovoltaics and 0.2% from wind power.

==== Hydro power ====
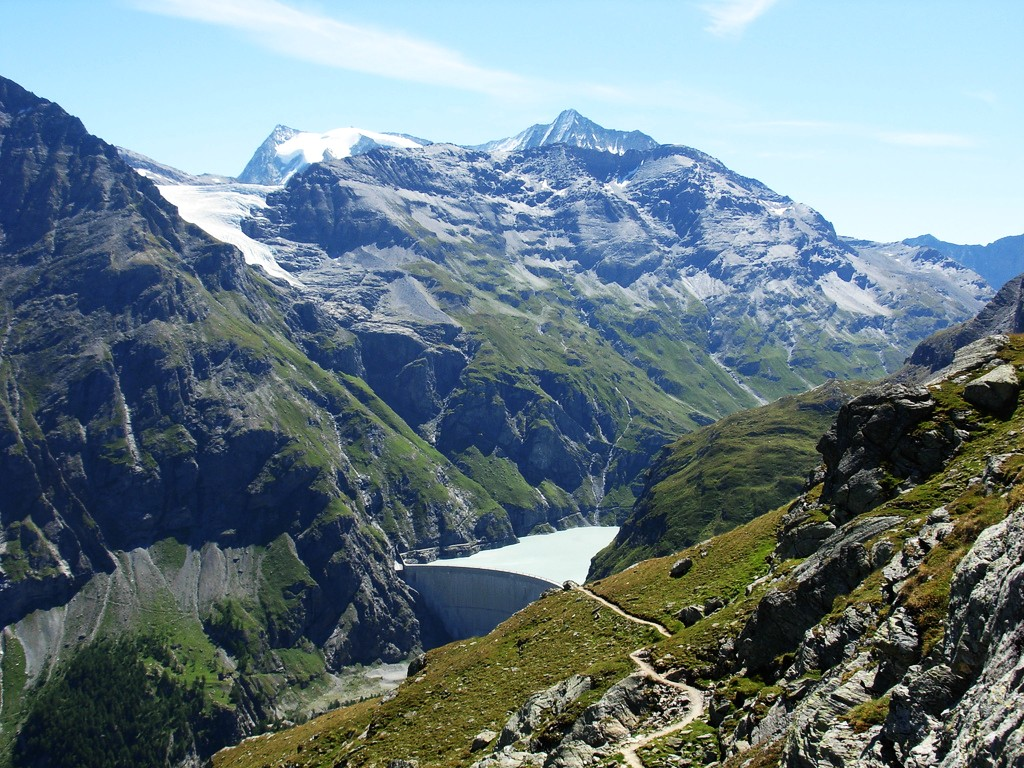
The Mauvoisin Dam. Hydropower plants constitute the most important source of electric energy in Switzerland.

Based on the estimated mean production level, hydropower still accounted for almost 90% of domestic electricity production at the beginning of the 1970s, but this figure fell to around 60% by 1985 following the commissioning of Switzerland's nuclear power plants, and is now around 56%. Hydropower therefore remains Switzerland's most important domestic source of renewable energy. Hydro energy was meaning to be taken down in 2013 with new laws on energy to be put in place but they were scrapped for a more eco friendly plan.

Hydroelectric companies received support from the state (for instance in the 2010s). Critics pointed out the lack of independence of the political institutions (cantonal and federal), of which several elected members are connected with the hydroelectric industry.

In 2021, Switzerland operated 682 hydroelectric power stations, accounting for 62% of the nation's total electricity production. The country also maintains 220 dams, the highest density globally. Notably, the Grande Dixence dam in the Valais canton holds the record as the world's tallest gravity dam, standing at 285 meters, and supplying power to approximately 500,000 households.

In line with the 2050 Energy Strategy, the government aims to increase hydropower output to 38,600 GWh annually by 2050 through plant renovations, expansions, and new constructions. To incentivize hydropower utilization, investment contributions and market premiums will be provided.

==== Nuclear power ====
The Swiss Federal Nuclear Safety Inspectorate (FNSI), an independent body under the federal government, oversees the safety aspects of Swiss nuclear facilities.

The Swiss Federal Office of Energy (SFOE) represents Switzerland in international organizations like the International Energy Agency (IEA) and the Nuclear Energy Agency (NEA) of the OECD. It participates in multilateral negotiations on energy policy and engages in bilateral committees for nuclear safety with neighboring countries like France, Germany, and Italy.

Switzerland has four operational reactors and two that have ceased operations. The operational four are two large (>1,000 MW) and two small (365 MW). In 2023 the reactors produced 23.0 TWh which was 32.4% of electricity generated. The country has set a target date of 2044 to phase out nuclear power.

The Swiss Federal Office of Energy (SFOE), a division of the Federal Department of the Environment, Transport, Energy, and Communications (DETEC), is responsible for managing Switzerland's energy supply and usage. It ensures a diverse and sustainable energy supply, maintains safety standards across energy sectors, and promotes efficient electricity and gas markets. Moreover, the SFOE leads initiatives to increase renewable energy usage and decrease CO_{2} emissions, while also coordinating national energy research efforts.

Switzerland ranks second in the World Energy Council's 2022 Trilemma Index, highlighting its effective management of energy security, energy equity, and environmental sustainability. It is a top performer in environmental sustainability, alongside Sweden and Norway, where low carbon sources represent over 95% of electricity generation.

A report in 2021 states that the majority of the Swiss electricity grid is old and in need of investment. The high voltage system needs to be upgraded from 220 to 380 kilovolt (kV) stations to better connect to neighbouring countries.

==== Solar ====
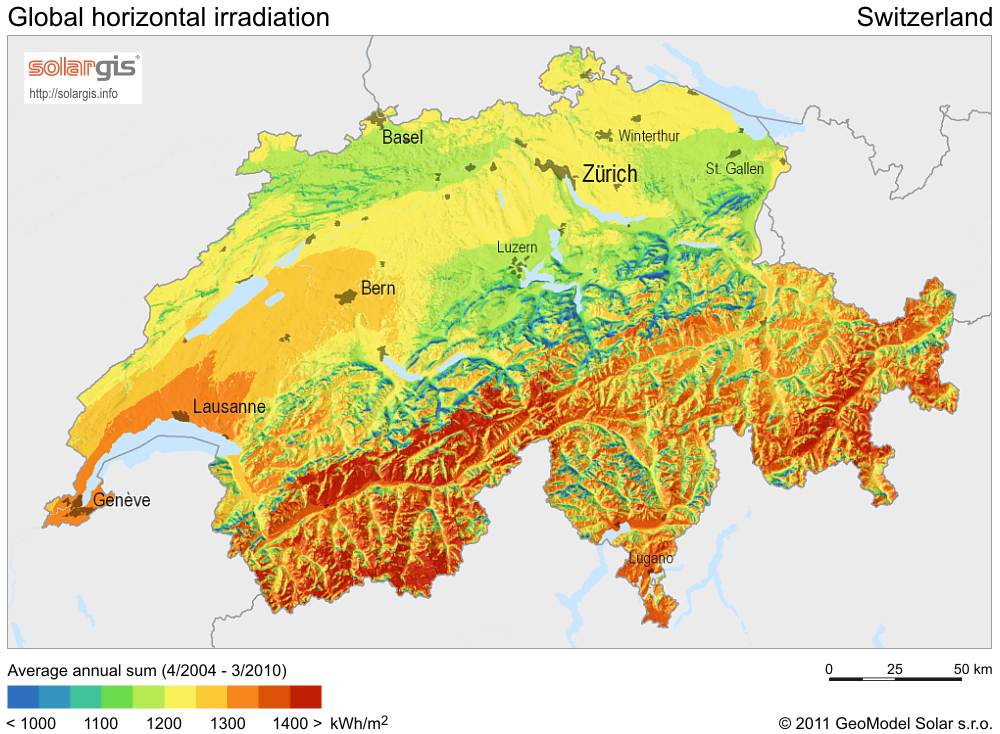
Solar potential of Switzerland

Solar energy in Switzerland has increased its share in electrical energy production from 0.04% in 2016 to 6.1% in 2022. It is currently subsidised in an attempt to make it more competitive and attractive.

In 2019, Switzerland announced plans of large scale solar auctions, and in 2021 and 2022 installations increased, with 4.7GW of total installed capacity in 2022.

Photovoltaic technology holds promise for future energy supply, with projections indicating that over 40% of electricity demand could be met by photovoltaics by 2050.

==== Wind ====
In 2022, there were 41 operating wind turbines with 87 MW of installed capacity, producing 146 GWh of electricity annually, accounting for 0.3% of total energy consumption. Wind parks producing at least 20 GWh annually are designated as being of 'national interest'.

There has been a proposal to produce around 600 GWh (< 0.2%) of electricity per annum using wind turbines by 2030. Switzerland's wind power potential is several TWh per year. The 2050 Energy Strategy aims to increase production from wind energy to 4.3 TWh a year, this would generate around 7% of the country's electricity.

==== Biomass ====
According to a 2018 IEA Bioenergy report, biomass accounts for 5.5% of Switzerland's total energy consumption and approximately 2.9% of its electricity production.

In 2023, a report from the Swiss Federal Institute for Forest Snow and Landscape Research suggests Switzerland could double its biomass energy production, potentially reaching 97 peta joules annually, with 50 PJ sourced from wood combustion. In 2019, wood combustion accounted for 4.3% of the nation's total energy consumption, generating 41 PJ. Despite the advantages of biomass energy, such as its ability to provide peak electricity, concerns persist regarding scarce raw materials, high production costs, and environmental impacts.

==== Carbon dioxide emissions ====
Development of carbon dioxide emissions

A study published in 2009 showed that the emissions of carbon dioxide (CO_{2}) due to the electricity consumed in Switzerland (total: 5.7 million tonnes) were seven times higher than the emissions of carbon dioxide due to the electricity produced in Switzerland (total: 0.8 million tonnes).

The study also showed that the production in Switzerland (64.6 TWh) was similar to the amount of electricity consumed in the country (63.7 TWh). Overall, Switzerland exported 7.6 TWh and imported 6.8 TWh; but, in terms of emissions of carbon dioxide, Switzerland exported "clean" electricity causing emissions of 0.1 million tonnes of CO_{2} and imported "dirty" electricity causing emissions of 5 million tonnes of CO_{2}.

The electricity produced in Switzerland generated about 14 grammes of CO_{2} per kilowatt hour. The electricity consumed in Switzerland generated about 100 grammes of CO_{2} per kilowatt hour.

A 2022 report highlights Switzerland's notable CO_{2} emissions, with an average carbon footprint of 14 tonnes per resident annually—markedly higher than the global average of 6 tonnes. The principal sources of these emissions are road transport, accounting for 40% of the total, and air travel, responsible for 10% prior to the pandemic. Despite its sustainability image, Switzerland faces obstacles in waste management, car usage reduction, and air travel limitation.

== Carbon tax ==
In January 2008, Switzerland implemented a carbon tax on all hydrocarbon fuels, unless are used for energy. Gasoline and diesel fuels are not affected. It is an incentive tax because it is designed to promote the economic use of hydrocarbon fuels. The tax amounts to SFr 12 per tonne CO_{2}, the equivalent of SFr 0.03 per litre of heating oil (US$0.108 per gallon) and SFr 0.025 per m^{3} of natural gas (US$0.024 per m^{3}). Switzerland prefers to rely on voluntary actions and measures to reduce emissions. The law mandated a CO_{2} tax if voluntary measures proved to be insufficient. In 2005, the federal government decided that additional measures were needed to meet Kyoto Protocol commitments of an 8% reduction in emissions below 1990 levels between 2008 and 2012. In 2007, the CO_{2} tax was approved by the Swiss Federal Council, coming into effect in 2008. In 2010, the highest tax rate was to be CHF 36 per tonne of CO_{2} (US$34.20 per tonne CO_{2}).

Companies are allowed to escape the tax by participating in emissions trading where they voluntarily commit to legally binding reduction targets. Emission allowances are given to companies for free, and each year emission allowances equal to the amount of additional CO_{2} emitted must be surrendered by the company. Companies are allowed to sell or trade excess permits. However, a company that fails to surrender sufficient allowances must pay the tax retroactively for each tonne emitted since the exemption was granted. As of 2009 some 400 companies operated under this program. In 2008 and 2009 the companies returned enough credits to the Swiss government to cover their CO_{2} emissions. The companies emitted about 2.6 million tonnes, well below the limit of 3.1 million tonnes. Switzerland issued so many allowances that few emissions permits were traded.

The tax is revenue-neutral because revenues are redistributed to companies and to the Swiss population. For example, if the population bears 60% of the tax burden, it receives 60% of the rebate. Revenues are redistributed to all payers, except those who exempt themselves from the tax through the cap-and-trade program. The revenue is given to companies in proportion to payroll. Tax revenues that were paid by the population are redistributed equally to all residents. In June 2009, the Swiss Parliament allocated about one-third of the carbon tax revenue to a 10-year construction initiative. This program promotes building renovations, renewable energies, waste heat reruse, and building engineering.

Tax revenue from 2008 to 2010 were distributed in 2010. In 2008, the tax raised around CHF 220 million (US$209 million) in revenue. As of 16 June 2010, a total of around SFr 360 million (US$342 million) had become available for distribution. The 2010 revenue was about SFr 630 million (US$598 million). SFr 200 million (US$190 million) was to be allocated for the building program, while the remaining SFr 430 million (US$409 million) was to be redistributed to the population. IEA commended Switzerland's tax for its design and that tax revenues would be recycled as "sound fiscal practice".

Since 2005, transport fuels in Switzerland have been subjected to the Climate Cent Initiative surcharge—a surcharge of SFr 0.015 per liter on gasoline and diesel (US$0.038 per gallon). However, this surcharge was supplemented with a CO_{2} tax on transport fuels if emissions reductions are not satisfactory. In their 2007 review, IEA recommended that Switzerland implement a CO_{2} tax on transport fuels or increase the Climate Cent surcharge to better balance the costs of meeting emissions reductions targets across sectors.

Switzerland's energy policy includes measures targeting CO_{2} emissions, such as the implementation of a CO_{2} tax in 2008. Furthermore, in 2021, legislation was passed to reinforce the expansion of domestic renewable energies, aiming to enhance the country's supply security.

The country's CO_{2} tax on fossil fuels for stationary sources, initiated in 2008, covers roughly 40% of its greenhouse emissions, mainly affecting the heating and process fuel sectors. The tax, originally CHF 96 per tonne of CO_{2}, was raised to CHF 120 in 2022. To ease economic impacts, two-thirds of this revenue returns to households and businesses, offsetting health insurance and social security costs. Nevertheless, proposals to increase carbon pricing on stationary sources and transport fuels in June 2021 were met with public resistance and ultimately rejected.

== Energy plan ==
In 2017, Swiss voters accepted the revised Energy Act, endorsing the implementation of the 2050 Energy Strategy, which principally aims to:

- encourage the adoption of renewable energy sources in Switzerland;
- diminish reliance on foreign fossil fuels;
- lower energy consumption;
- enhance energy efficiency measures.

Under the 2050 Energy Strategy, the construction of new nuclear power plants is prohibited.

In 2021, a report suggested that electricity demand could rise by up to 30% by 2050, potentially reaching a 46% increase if accounting for the demand for green hydrogen.

The Swiss electric grid is largely decarbonized; since the 1980s, low-carbon sources (renewables and nuclear) have made up 97% of national electricity generation. Further emission reductions are thus expected as the transport and heating/cooling sectors gradually switch to electricity.

== See also ==
- 2000-watt society
- Federal Department of Environment, Transport, Energy and Communications
- CO2 Act (Switzerland)
- Thermal power plant of Vouvry

== Notes and references ==
- "Energy" in German, French and Italian in the online Historical Dictionary of Switzerland.
