= Orllati =

Swiss company group

Groupe Orllati SA
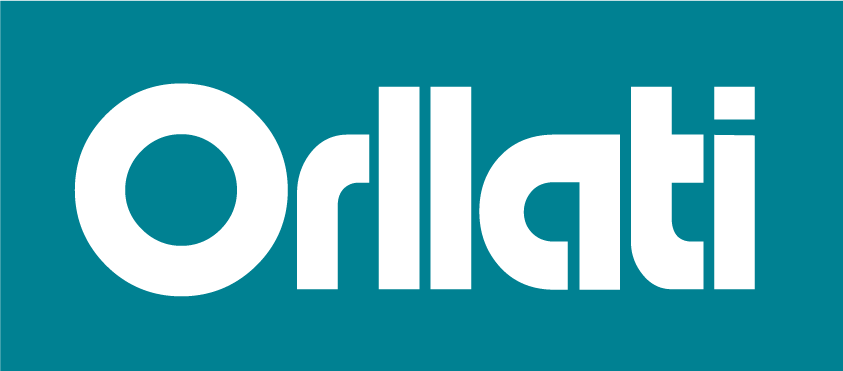
- Groupe Orllati logo
- Industry: Construction, Real estate, Environmental services
- Founded: 1995; 31 years ago
- Founder: Avni OrllatiBasri Orllati
- Headquarters: Bioley-Orjulaz, Switzerland
- Key people: Avni OrllatiBasri OrllatiGjevgjet OrllatiVelush OrllatiGilbert Fouvy (Chairman, LMT SA)Claude Luche (Director, Forasol SA)Laurent Pellegrino (Director, AMI SA and Orllati SFTP SA)
- Revenue: 400 million CHF (2022)
- Total equity: 600,000 CHF
- Number of employees: 1000 (2024)
- Website: www.orllati.ch
- Footnotes / references Slogan: "Your requirements, our expertise" (Vos exigences, nos compétences)2011: Transformed into a groupSwiss Commercial Register: CHE-106.822.550Revenue increase in 2022

Groupe Orllati SA is a Swiss company active in heavy construction, real estate, and environmental sectors. It is headquartered in Bioley-Orjulaz.

In 30 years they have become one of the major actors in the French speaking parts of Switzerland with over 1000 employees and a turnover surpassing 400 million chf, producing over 30% of Vaud's sand and gravel. Their particularity is the full vertical integration strategy combined with the systematic land acquisition: they own and control each step of the demolition circuit

== History ==
In 1989, at the age of 14, Avni Orllati and his twin brother Basri arrived in Switzerland through family reunification and in 1995 they rented a machine to break concrete. Two years later, on April 18, 1997, they established Orllati SA after acquiring a struggling company with a fleet of construction equipment. Later, their older brother Gjevgjet Orllati joined the business.

In 2001, Orllati acquired LMT SA and relocated to a former cantonal gravel pit in Bioley-Orjulaz, in the Gros-de-Vaud region. This provided a larger fleet of machinery and a site for processing uncontaminated excavation waste.

Initially discreet, Orllati gained prominence in 2005 when Avni Orllati began acquiring land and expanding into real estate alongside civil engineering activities.

In 2017, Orllati inaugurated new facilities at its Vaud site for treating contaminated soil, a first in French-speaking Switzerland. This allowed the company to process soil locally, reducing its ecological footprint and supporting its environmental remediation goals.

== Controversies ==
In late 2016, Groupe Orllati SA faced anonymous accusations of environmental pollution at its Bioley-Orjulaz site. Investigations identified the accuser as former journalist Fabien Dunand. A judicial investigation, dubbed Operation Cracoucass, concluded that the allegations were baseless and driven by economic rivalries, notably involving a competing Vaud real estate developer. In October 2021, Dunand was convicted of slander and raising a false alarm, receiving a 150-day fine. His appeal was rejected by the Cantonal Court, which upheld the conviction with a four-year suspension. On August 23, 2023, the Federal Supreme Court confirmed the conviction.

In 2023 Valérie Dittli questioned the authorisation from the rural land commission of a purchase of agricultural land made by the subsidiary Orllati Real Estate SA. The agricultural land, less expensive than land for real estate, legally only able to be acquired by farmers and be exploited for agricultural use, was sold to Orllati after the other potential buyers had withdrawn their offers.

In 2023 activists occupy a forest in Vufflens in the Vaud region of Switzerland, protesting Orllati's plans to turn it into a gravel pit and the “concrete economy”.

In 2024 the organisation Grondements de terre occupied the Ballens-forest in Morges, that had been bought by a subsidiary of Orllati.

== Gallery ==
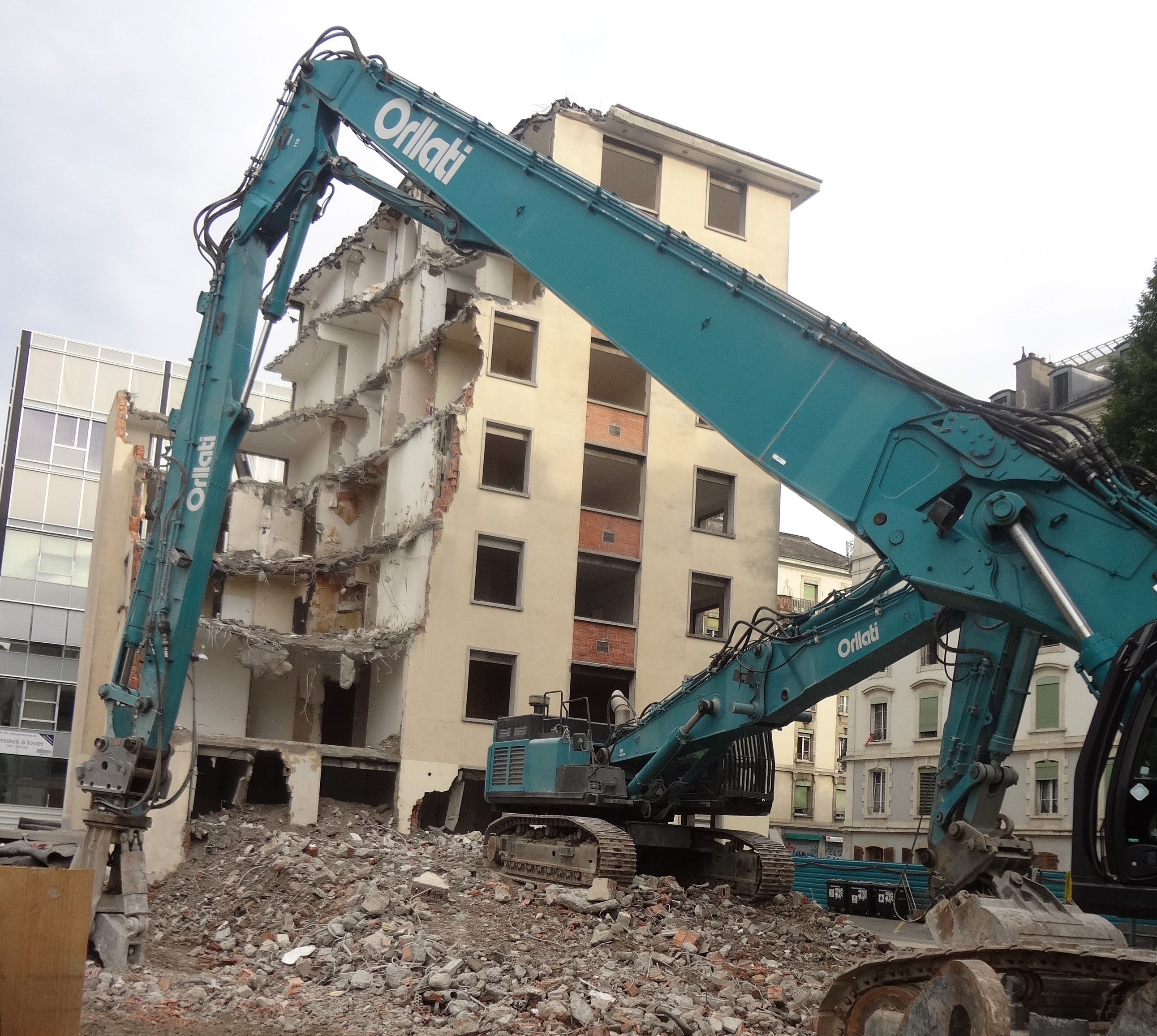
Demolition of buildings in Geneva, 2020.

== See also ==
- Environmental services
- Canton of Vaud
- Swiss economy
- Demolition
- List of companies of Switzerland
