= CO2 Act (Switzerland) =

Swiss federal law

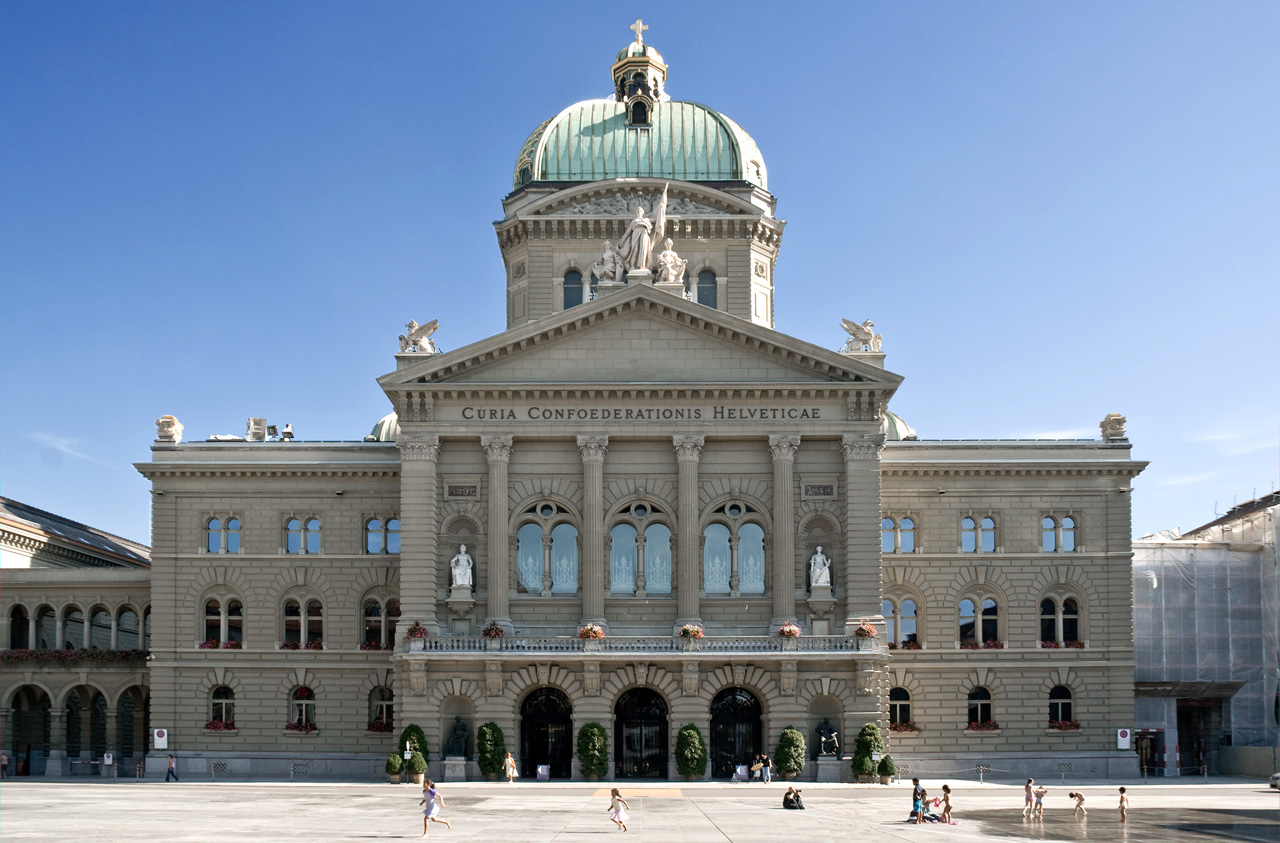

Federal Assembly of Switzerland
- Long title: Federal Act on the Reduction of CO2 Emissions (SR 641.71)
- Territorial extent: Switzerland
- Enacted by: Federal Assembly of Switzerland
- Enacted: 23 December 2011
- Commenced: 1 January 2013

Repeals
- CO2 Act (2000)
- Status: Current legislation

The Federal Act on the Reduction of CO_{2} Emissions (CO_{2} Act) (Note: German: CO2-Gesetz; French: Loi sur le CO2; Italian: Legge sul CO2) is a Swiss federal law that regulates carbon dioxide emissions to mitigate climate change.

The CO_{2} Act is at the core of Switzerland's climate political measures. One of the key measures is the introduction of a carbon tax, to disincentivize greenhouse gas emissions. Part of the levy is used for climate protection, and the remaining amounts are redistributed to the population and business community in proportion to their original payment (art. 36). Another pillar of the tax is the introduction of an emissions trading scheme.

The law is based on articles 74 and 89 of the Swiss Constitution. According to these, the Confederation shall "legislate on the protection of the population and its natural environment against damage or nuisance" (art. 74) and "on the use of energy by installations, vehicles and appliances" (art. 89).

From 2023, the CO_{2} Act is supplemented by the Act on Climate Protection Targets, Innovation and Strengthening Energy Security. It sets the objective for Switzerland to reach net-zero greenhouse gas emissions by 2050.

== History ==
=== Context ===
Since 1992, the United Nations Framework Convention on Climate Change has aimed to stabilise "at a level that would prevent dangerous anthropogenic (human induced) interference with the climate system" (in force in Switzerland since 1994).

The first CO_{2} Act was adopted in 1999 and came into force in 2000. The law is totally revised in 2011, and enters into force in 2013.

=== Failed revisions ===
In 2017, Switzerland ratified the Paris Climate Agreement, which calls for keeping the increase in the global average temperature well below 2°C above pre-industrial levels, preferably 1.5°C. As a result, the Federal Council proposed in 2017 a total revision of the CO_{2} Act for the period after 2020. During the debates in the National Council, the bill is considerably weakened and finally rejected in December 2018.

In October 2018, the IPCC publishes the Special Report on Global Warming of 1.5°C. In 2019, the popular initiative "for a healthy climate (glacier initiative)" (Note: German: Für ein gesundes Klima (Gletscher-Initiative), French: pour un climat sain (initiative pour les glaciers), Italian: Per un clima sano (Iniziativa per i ghiacciai)) is filed, calling for zero net emissions by 2050 and at least a linear reduction by then. As a reaction, the Federal Council announces in August 2019 that aims to achieve carbon neutrality by 2050.

In autumn 2019, following the student climate strikes, the Council of States takes up the Federal Council's draft. In September 2020, after the 2019 federal elections, the new draft is approved by the Federal Assembly. On 25 September 2020, the Council of States adopts the total revision in a final vote by 33 votes to 5 and 6 abstentions, the National Council does the same later that morning by 129 to 59 and 8 abstentions.

New measures:

- Target to limit global warming to 1.5 degrees;
- Target to reduce CO_{2} emissions by 50% by 2030 (compared to 1990);
- Three quarters of the CO_{2} reductions must be achieved in Switzerland;
- Tax on airline tickets and private jets;
- Reduction of CO_{2} emissions from new heating systems;
- Increase in the cap on the tax on fossil fuels;
- Fuel importers to offset their emissions;
- Redistribution of a large part of the CO_{2} tax to the population;
- Creation of a climate fund to finance projects;
- The Swiss Financial Market Supervisory Authority and the Swiss National Bank measure financial climate risks.

In the federal referendum of 13 June 2021, a referendum is held and the revision of the CO_{2} Act is rejected by 51.59% of voters.

=== Act on Climate Protection Targets ===
In September 2021, the Federal Council announced that it would propose a new bill by the end of the year and that the bill would not introduce a new tax and would rely on incentives. According to the Swiss Academy of Sciences, the project will only achieve the climate targets through the massive purchase of foreign certificates, and this at the expense of taxpayers rather than domestic polluters.

In December 2021, the Federal Council puts the new bill out to consultation, with the aim of halving emissions by 2030 and providing incentives for insulating buildings and replacing heating systems. In June 2023, the new climate and innovation law is approved by Swiss voters (Federal Act on Climate Protection Targets, Innovation and Strengthening Energy Security). It sets the objective for Switzerland to reach net-zero greenhouse gas emissions by 2050; it also provides financial support over ten years for home-owners and businesses to invest in green technologies.

In 2022, the Green Party and the Socialist Party launched the popular initiative "for a climate fund", which aims to invest 3 to 7 billion francs in the ecological transition.
