= Tamoil =

Petroleum company in the Netherlands

Oilinvest Group B. V.
- Company type: Private
- Industry: Petroleum
- Founded: 1988
- Headquarters: The Hague, Netherlands
- Area served: Global
- Services: Oil
- Owner: Oilinvest Group
- Number of employees: 1,300 direct employees (2013)
- Parent: Oilinvest Group
- Subsidiaries: Tamoil Nederland B.V. (Netherlands); Tamoil Italia S.p.A. (Italy); Deutsche Tamoil GmbH (Germany); Tamoil S.A. (Switzerland)
- Website: www.tamoil.com

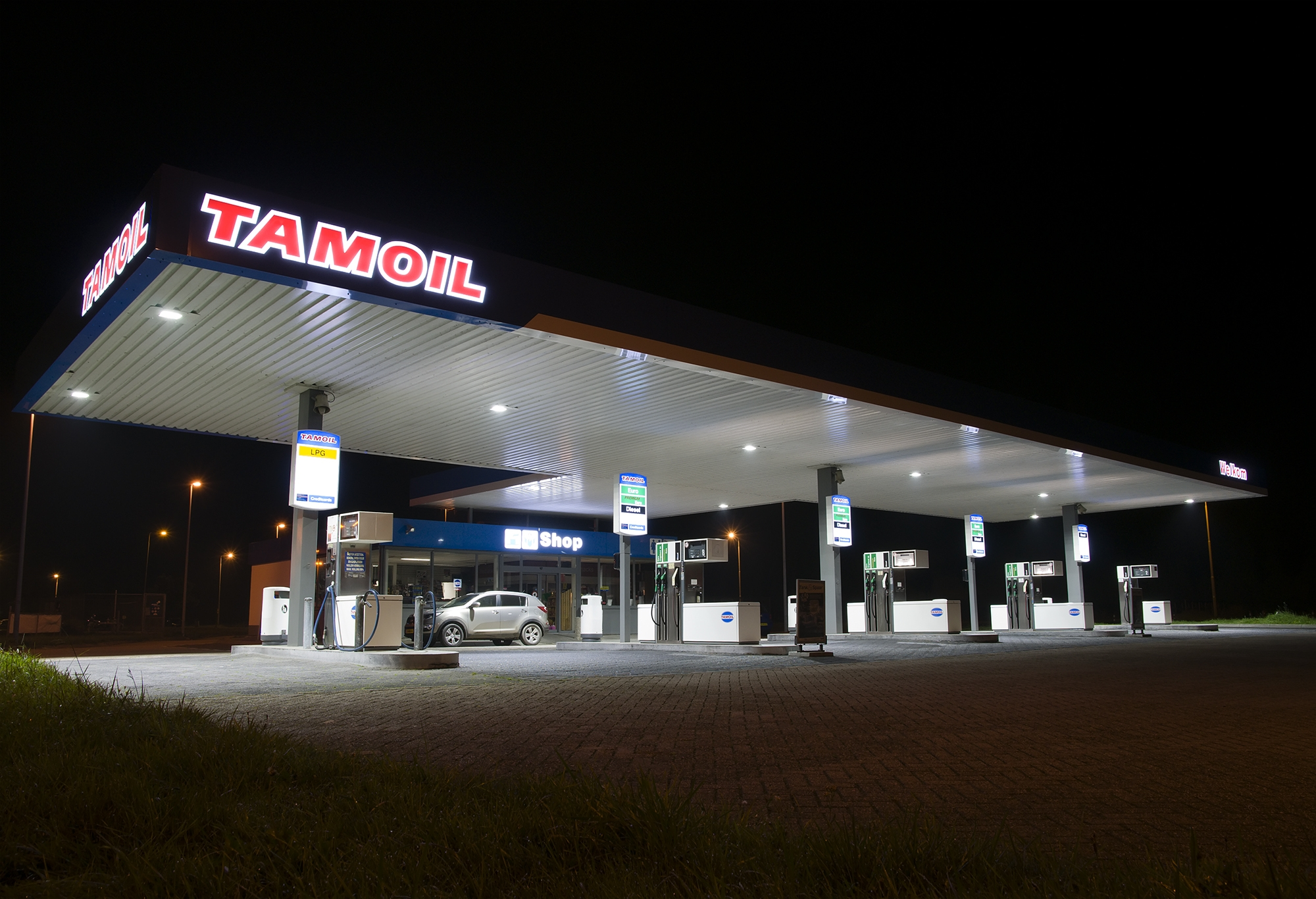
Service station in the Netherlands

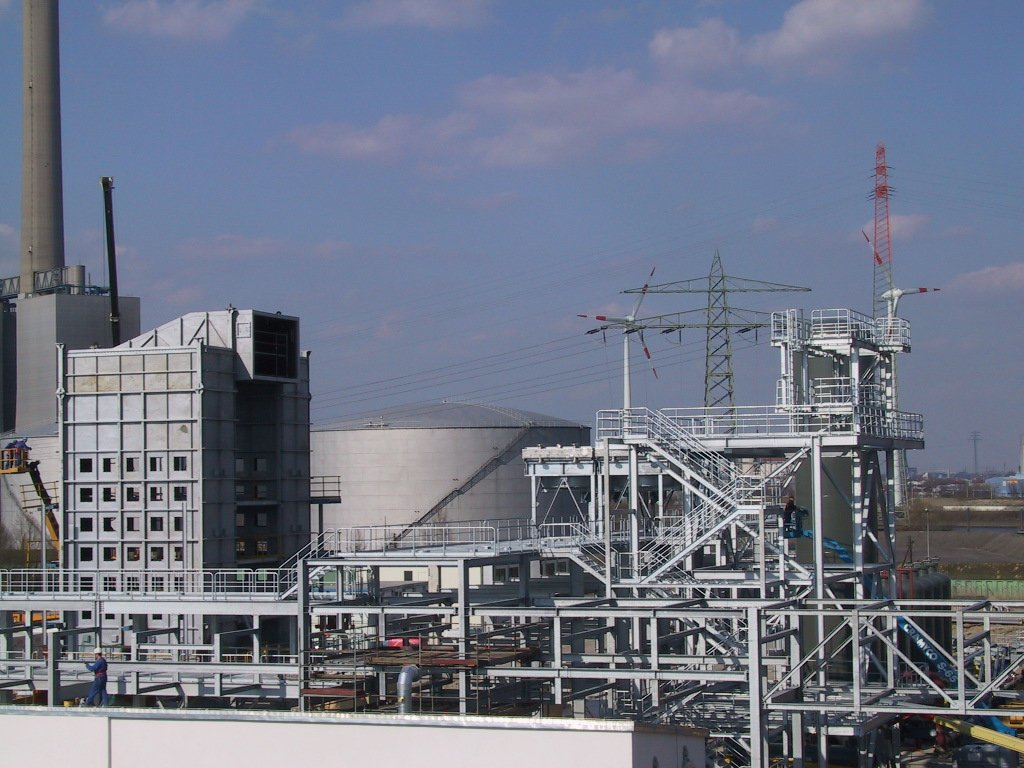
Holborn refinery, Germany

Tamoil is the trading name of the Oilinvest Group, a fuel energy provider within the European downstream oil and gas sector. The Oilinvest Group refines crude oil and markets refined oil products primarily under the Tamoil and the HEM brands in Europe. The Oilinvest Group is involved in supplying, trading, refining and selling petroleum products in Italy, Germany, Switzerland, Spain and the Netherlands and carries out its trading activities from Cyprus.

The headquarters of Oilinvest (Netherlands) B.V. is located in the World Trade Center The Hague, from where it oversees all its investments in the European oil downstream markets.

== History ==
The origins of the Oilinvest Group date back to 1988, when the Group was established to consolidate a number of European energy investments that were made by the Libyan state. The ‘Tamoil’ brand name was born following the acquisition of a refinery and Amoco and Texaco retail network in Italy.

During the 1990s Oilinvest expanded its Tamoil brand rapidly by increasing its position in Italy and entering markets in Switzerland (1990), Germany (1991), Spain (1992) and the Netherlands (1993) before moving into Egypt in 1993. From 2000 onwards, Oilinvest expanded its activities in Africa in over 19 African countries before selling the African business to another Libyan company.

Oilinvest formally severed its link to the Muammar Gaddafi government of Libya in 2011 by moving most of its stock from the Libyan government to a Dutch stichting (foundation), which allowed the company to continue operation despite EU sanctions on Libya. As of September 2012 it had returned to 70% ownership by the Libyan National Oil Corporation and 30% by the Libyan government.
