= 2026 in Libya =

- Decades: 2000s; 2010s; 2020s
- See also: Other events of 2026; List of years in Libya

Events in Libya in 2026.

== Incumbents ==
- President: Mohamed al-Menfi
- Prime Minister: Contested
  - Abdul Hamid Dbeibeh (GNU)
  - Osama Hammad (GNS)

== Events ==
=== January ===
- 15 January – At least 21 bodies of migrants are found in a mass grave near Ajdabiya. Up to 10 survivors show signs of torture, and a farm owner is arrested after admitting the presence of the grave.
- 24 January – Libya signs a US$20 billion 25-year oil development deal with TotalEnergies and ConocoPhillips through Waha Oil Company.
- 31 January – Three members of the Libyan National Army are killed in an attack along the border with Niger.

=== February ===
- 3 February – Assassination of Saif al-Islam Gaddafi: Saif al-Islam Gaddafi, the second son of former leader Muammar Gaddafi, is shot dead in Zintan.
- 6 February –
  - The United States says it has captured Zubayr Al-Bakoush, a key participant in the 2012 Benghazi attack.
  - A rubber boat carrying migrants capsizes off Zuwara, leaving 53 people dead or missing and only two survivors.
- 9 February – A medical helicopter crashes at the Maaten al-Sarra Air Base, killing all five occupants on board.
- 11 February – Libya grants oil exploration and production licences for the first time since 2009 to several foreign energy firms, including Chevron Corporation and Aiteo.
- 21 February – The bodies of five migrants are found washed up on the coast of Qasr al-Akhyar.
- 24 February – Dozens of soldiers are killed in clashes in areas bordering Niger and Chad over several days during a joint operation affiliated with the Libyan National Army.

=== March ===
- 3 March – The Russian tanker Arctic Metagaz is attacked by a suspected Ukrainian naval drone off the coast of Libya. All 30 crew are rescued.

=== April ===
- 18 April – The bodies of 17 migrants are recovered by authorities from the coast near Zuwarah.
- 28 April – The Tripoli Criminal Court sentences four members of a human trafficking gang to between 12 and 22 years in prison for migrant smuggling, abduction, and torture.
- 29 April – A boat carrying migrants sinks off Tobruk, leaving 17 people dead, nine missing and seven rescued.

=== June ===
- 12 June – A boat carrying migrants capsizes off eastern Libya, leaving 51 passengers dead or missing and 10 survivors.
- 15 June – The bodies of 15 migrants are discovered along the coast of Al-Khums.
- 21 June – Ossama Anjiem aka Ossama al-Masri, a warlord who led the Tripoli branch of the Reform and Rehabilitation Institution, is convicted for committing human rights violations on inmates at the facility.
- 23 June – The eastern-based Government of National Stability led by Osama Hammad bans the entry of nationals from Sudan, Eritrea, Ethiopia, and Somalia, citing a reorganization of foreign nationals' entry procedures.

=== July ===
- 24 July – The United States imposes a 12.5% tariff on Libya, citing the presence of alleged forced labour in the supply chain.
- 27 July – 2026 Libyan protests: Protests break out in Tripoli over an electricity crisis and deteriorating standard of living.
- 29 July – Mohammed Takala is re-elected as Head of the High Council of State with 80 votes out of 136. Naji Mukhtar is elected as First Deputy Speaker with 69 votes, Omar Dabushah as Second Deputy Speaker and Belgassem Dabraz as Rapporteur with 70 votes.

=== August ===
- 10 August – Fawzi al-Mansouri, commander of the Libyan National Army's intelligence branch, is assassinated in a car bombing outside his home in Benghazi.
- 11 August – A drone assault hits the Zawia Oil Refining Company for the third time in two days.
- 12 August – An attack on the South Zawiya substation causes a complete power outage across wide areas south of Zawiya; more than 700 MW of the Zawiya power station’s 1,300 capacity remains unavailable.
- 17 August – Seven migrants are found dead after a charity rescue ship rescues 50 others from a wooden boat in international waters off Libya; the survivors claim to have had departed Zuwara the previous day.
- 25 August – The country’s two rival governments reach an initial agreement to overhaul the electoral system.

=== October ===
- 7 October – The House of Representatives dismisses Aguila Saleh Issa as speaker.
- 9 October – The Subul al-Salam Infantry Brigade seizes more than 1.3 million narcotic pills, following a firefight between the military and smugglers in Kufra.
- 13 October – Two people are killed by torrential rain and severe flooding in Tripoli.
- 18 October – Eight people are killed and eight others are injured after a mortar shell explosion in Zawiya, Tripolitania.
- 20 October – A 2019 maritime border agreement with Turkey is unanimously approved by the House of Representatives.
- 23 October – The International Civil Aviation Organization formally lifts airspace restrictions on Libya imposed in 2015 during the Libyan civil war.
- 28 October – The eastern-based Government of National Stability bans nationals from Iran and Afghanistan from entering the country.

=== November ===
- 3 November – Grand Mufti Sadiq al-Gharyani bans the sale of Nike products, citing its pagan etymology and symbolism.
- 7 November – Egypt reopens its embassy in Tripoli after a 12-year closure, citing an improvement in relations with the western-based Government of National Unity.
- 11 November – One worker is killed in an explosion caused by a gas leak and a fire at the Sirte Oil Company's gas complex in Brega.
- 17 November – Eastern Libyan authorities seize more than 4 million narcotic pills and 29 kg (64 lb) of cocaine and hashish in Derna, after arresting multiple members of a drug-trafficking gang.
- 22 November – Suspected Ukrainian unmanned surface vehicles strike and severely damage the Russian Navy corvette Merkury at the Benghazi naval base, injuring several personnel. Both rival Libyan governments condemn the attack as a violation of national sovereignty, while eastern authorities launch a joint investigation with Russia.

== Holidays ==
- 17 February – Revolution Day
- 30 March–1 April – End of Ramadan
- 5 June – Arafat Day
- 6–8 June – Feast of Sacrifice
- 26 June – Islamic New Year
- 4 September – The Prophet's Birthday
- 16 September – Martyrs' Day
- 23 October – Liberation Day
- 24 December – Independence Day

== Deaths ==
- 3 February – Saif al-Islam Gaddafi, 53, second son of former leader Muammar Gaddafi.
- 25 August – Lamin Khalifah Fhimah, 70, station manager (Libyan Arab Airlines), co-defendant in the Pan Am Flight 103 bombing trial.
- 3 November – Abu Bakr Baira, 85, Academic, member of the House of Representatives and its Speaker from 4 August until 5 August 2014.
