= 2025 in Libya =

- Decades: 2000s; 2010s; 2020s
- See also: Other events of 2025; List of years in Libya

Events in Libya in 2025.

== Incumbents ==
- President: Mohamed al-Menfi
- Prime Minister: Contested Abdul Hamid Dbeibeh (GNU) Osama Hammad (GNS)

== Events ==
=== January ===
- 12 January – A bus crashes along a highway in Al-Loud, killing 23 people and injuring five others.
- 19 January – Ossama Anjiem aka Ossama al-Masri, a warlord wanted by the International Criminal Court for war crimes during the Libyan Civil War, is arrested in Turin, Italy, under the ICC warrant but is released and deported to Libya after a court declines to approve his arrest.

=== February ===
- 7 February – The bodies of at least 49 migrants are found in two mass graves in Kufra.
- 8–9 February – A boat carrying migrants sinks off the coast of Marsa Dela Port, killing at least 16 people and leaving 10 others missing.

=== March ===
- 20 March – Samir Shegwara, the mayor of Hay al Andalous and author of a book accusing the Mukhabarat el-Jamahiriya of involvement in the Lockerbie bombing in 1988, is arrested on charges of unauthorized possession of classified security documents.
- 22 March – A bus collides with a truck on the Jalu-Kufra highway, killing six people and injuring another.

=== April ===
- 4 April – The government orders the suspension of operations of 10 international aid organizations, including Doctors Without Borders, the Norwegian Refugee Council, the Danish Refugee Council, Terre des hommes, CARE International, Acted, Intersos and Cesvi on charges of threatening the country's demographics by assisting the settlement of migrants from other African countries.

=== May ===
- 1 May – The bodies of six bodies of migrants are recovered near Misrata.
- 10 May – At least three migrants, including two children, die during a sea crossing from Zawiya to Italy.
- 12 May – 2025 Tripoli clashes: Abdel Ghani al-Kikli, commander of the Stability Support Apparatus (SSA) militia, is assassinated, leading to armed clashes between the SSA and the Government of National Unity (GNU) that leave at least six people dead in Tripoli.
- 14 May – At least one person is killed during clashes between rival militias in Tripoli.
- 15 May – Libya formally grants the International Criminal Court jurisdiction over crimes committed on its soil from 2011 through 2027.
- 16 May – A police officer is killed during protests against Prime Minister Abdul Hamid Dbeibeh in Tripoli.
- 17 May – Nine unidentified corpses are discovered in a morgue refrigerator at Al-Khadra Hospital, previously controlled by the SSA.
- 19 May – At least 58 unidentified corpses, showing signs of burning, are found in the morgue refrigerator of Abu Salim Accidents Hospital in Tripoli previously under SSA control.
- 23 May – Seven Sudanese refugees are found dead inside a broken-down vehicle in the deserts of Kufra.
- 30 May – A vehicle carrying Sudanese migrants collides with a truck in the deserts of Kufra, killing 11 passengers and the Libyan driver.

=== June ===
- 4 June – US President Donald Trump issues a proclamation barring Libyan nationals from entering the United States.
- 17 June – At least 60 people are feared missing after two ships wreck off of the coast of Libya.
- 18 June – A Portuguese referee is injured along with several fans amid clashes and a pitch invasion during a football match between Al Ahli SC and Al Ittihad SCSC in Tripoli.

=== July ===
- 9 July – The Government of National Stability declares European Union migration commissioner Magnus Brunner, Greek Migration and Asylum Minister Thanos Plevris, Italian Interior Minister Matteo Piantedosi and Maltese Home Affairs Minister Byron Camilleri "persona non grata" in areas of eastern Libya under its control in response to their earlier meeting with officials of the rival Government of National Unity in Tripoli.
- 14 July – Over 100 migrants are freed from captivity by a gang in Ajdabiya; five traffickers are arrested.
- 18 July –
  - Khaled Mohamed Ali El Hishri aka Al-Buti, a former official of Mitiga Prison in Tripoli wanted by the International Criminal Court for war crimes and crimes against humanity committed on prison inmates in 2015, is arrested in Germany.
  - The Government of National Stability deports 700 Sudanese migrants.
- 25 July – A boat carrying migrants towards Europe sinks near Tobruk, killing at least 15 people.

=== August ===
- 8 August – The International Criminal Court unseals an arrest warrant against Al-Saiqa Brigade member Saif Suleiman Sneidel, who is accused of committing war crimes in the Benghazi area from 2016 to 2017.
- 16 August – 2025 Libyan municipal elections.
- 21 August – A rocket attack is made near the headquarters of the United Nations mission to Libya in Janzur.
- 24 August – The Libyan Coast Guard is accused of opening fire at a humanitarian aid ship operated by SOS Mediterranee about 40 nautical miles north of the Libyan coast.

=== September ===
- 9 September – A boat carrying migrants sinks off the coast of Kambut, killing 19 passengers and leaving 42 others missing.
- 14 September – A boat carrying 75 Sudanese refugees catches fire off the Libyan coast, killing at least 50 passengers.
- 16 September – Thirty-five migrants are rescued by the Libyan Navy near Zuwarah.
- 24 September – The bodies of five suspected migrants are recovered in the Great Sand Sea.

=== October ===
- 18 October – 2025 Libyan municipal elections.
- 20 October –
  - 2025 Libyan municipal elections.
  - A 16 in (410 mm)-segment of pipeline between the Sabah and Zella oilfields leaks oil, which is then contained by the Zueitina Oil Company with no reported agricultural damage or environmental degradation.
- 28 October – The Libyan Red Crescent in Sabratha reports that at least 18 migrants died and over 90 were rescued, after a boat capsizes near Surman.

=== November ===
- 3 November – A boat carrying migrants capsizes in the Bouri Field, leaving 42 passengers missing and seven survivors.
- 7 November – Thirteen Mediterranean NGOs cut ties with the Libyan Coast Guard over abuses of asylum seekers. The Justice Fleet is launched in response, to document incidents and pursue legal action.
- 15 November – Two migrant boats capsize off Al-Khums, killing at least four passengers on the first vessel.

=== December ===
- 1 December – Khaled Mohamed Ali El Hishri is surrendered by German authorities to the International Criminal Court in The Hague, the Netherlands to face trial for war crimes and crimes against humanity.
- 12 December – Ahmed Oumar al-Fitouri al-Dabbashi, a militia commander sanctioned by the United Nations for his role in trafficking migrants across the Mediterranean Sea, is killed in a raid by security forces in Sabratha.
- 22 December – The Grand National Assembly of Turkey extends the mandate for Turkish military intervention in Libya until 2027.
- 23 December – A jet crashes shortly after takeoff from Ankara, Turkey, killing all eight occupants, including Mohammed Ali Ahmed al-Haddad, the chief of staff of the Libyan Army.
- 29 December – The National Museum of Libya reopens for the first time since 2011.

== Holidays ==
- 17 February – Revolution Day
- 30 March–1 April – End of Ramadan
- 5 June – Arafat Day
- 6–8 June – Feast of Sacrifice
- 26 June – Islamic New Year
- 4 September – The Prophet's Birthday
- 16 September – Martyrs' Day
- 23 October – Liberation Day
- 24 December – Independence Day

== Deaths ==
- Abdel Ghani al-Kikli, military leader
- Ashour Bourashed, politician and diplomat
