= 2027 in Libya =

- Decades: 2000s; 2010s; 2020s
- See also: Other events of 2027; List of years in Libya

Events in Libya in 2027.

== Events ==
=== Predicted and scheduled ===
- By 17 February – 2027 Libyan presidential and parliamentary election
- 2 August – Solar eclipse of August 2, 2027 (partial eclipse)

== Holidays ==
- 17 February – Revolution Day
- 10–11 March – End of Ramadan
- 15 May – Arafat Day
- 17–18 May – Feast of Sacrifice
- 6 June – Islamic New Year
- 14 August – The Prophet's Birthday
- 16 September – Martyrs' Day
- 23 October – Liberation Day
- 24 December – Independence Day
