= Racial disparities in the COVID-19 pandemic in the United States =

Unequal impact between different groups

The COVID-19 pandemic has had an unequal impact on different racial and ethnic groups in the United States, resulting in new disparities of health outcomes as well as exacerbating existing health and economic disparities.

The pandemic struck the United States in March 2020, causing almost 2 million known cases by June 1, 2020. During that initial wave, known cases were more than twice as common among Black Americans (62 cases per 10,000) and over three times as common among Latino Americans (73 cases per 10,000) as among White Americans (23 cases per 10,000). In the US, minority groups were disproportionately impacted by the health and economic consequences of the pandemic. Non-Hispanic Black Americans and Hispanic/Latin Americans have been hospitalized at 4.7 times the rate of White Americans, while non-Hispanic Native Americans have been hospitalized at 5.3 times the rate of White Americans.

Effects on racial minorities have most widely been discussed by news sources in terms of increased infection and mortality rates, but these effects extend to other domains including long-lasting detriment to educational outcomes and decreased economic stability. As such, the COVID-19 pandemic has brought to light existing racial and ethnic disparities in the United States through the risks of COVID, economic and financial tolls, and racism faced disproportionately by minority groups.

For instance, Black and Hispanic people have faced economic hardship during the COVID-19 pandemic due to their social and economic standing in the United States. Additionally, anti-Asian racism has been prevalent throughout the pandemic. As COVID vaccines began to be distributed to the public in December 2020, vaccinations were distributed unequally by race: in some states, Black and Hispanic people received smaller shares of the vaccinations even if their infection rates were higher. For example, Colorado had 10% of vaccinations going to Hispanic people even though Hispanics accounted for 41% of total cases. In the same state, White people received 80% of vaccinations even though they comprise 68% of the population.

== Racial disparities ==
The COVID-19 pandemic has revealed and exacerbated inequalities through uneven effects across social domains. Some of these impacts include disproportionate financial toll, crime, education, human rights, xenophobia and racism, disproportionate impacts by gender, and racial inequalities. Racial disparities in the public health and socioeconomic impacts of COVID-19 have also been attributed to racial capitalism.

=== Black Americans ===
==== Infection rate ====
Black Americans have a greater propensity for infection than White Americans. For instance, a study from April 2020 showed that Black Americans in Chicago accounted for over 50% of COVID-19 cases, while comprising only 30% of the city's population. In Michigan, Black Americans, who comprise 14% of the population, suffered 33% of the state's COVID-19 cases. These examples are representative of the scale and magnitude of disparities affecting Black communities across the US. In fact, in April 2020 the Johns Hopkins University and American Community Survey noted from responses by 131 predominantly Black communities in the US that the infection rate of Black Americans was 137.5 per 100,000 individuals, more than three times that of White Americans.

As the pandemic has progressed, racial inequalities have persisted. Data from September 2020 indicated that Black Americans still suffered a disproportionate infection rate. Further analysis through March 2021 further confirmed that Black Americans had a higher infection rate than their White counterparts.

Due to higher death rates from COVID-19 and deaths at younger ages, Black Americans suffered a greater decline in life expectancy in 2020 than their White counterparts. Specifically, projected life expectancy declined by 0.73 years for White people but 2.26 years for Black people.

===== Co-occurrence of chronic disease =====
Closely associated with infection rates is the co-occurrence of chronic disease, since underlying disease has been tightly linked to greater COVID-19 infection rates and poorer outcomes.

Chronic disease has been associated with a number of factors, with diet and nutrition being a key contributor. According to the Third National Health and Nutrition Examination Survey conducted from 1999 to 2002, Black Americans were 43% percent less likely than White Americans to consume vegetables and fruits at quantities meeting the USDA guidelines. Moreover, according to the Behavioral Risk Factor Surveillance Survey data from 2000, Black Americans were the racial group least likely to consume vegetables and fruits five or more times per day.

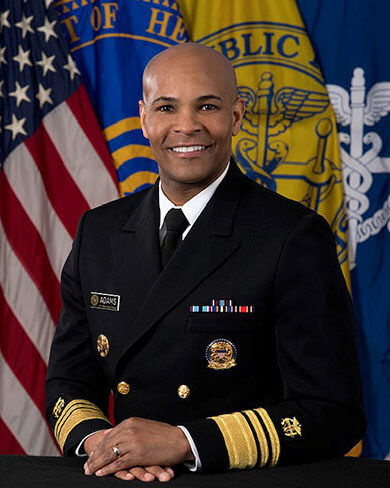
US Surgeon General Jerome Adams

While older studies demonstrate the long-standing disparity in access and quality of food consumption, new studies support persistence of unequal access to and consumption of fruits and vegetables. In fact, some studies goes as far as to say "African Americans have an increased risk of cardiovascular disease partly due to low fruit and vegetable consumption", and that reduced peripheral artery disease is associated with greater fruit and vegetable consumption. In fact, the connection between nutrition and COVID-19 outcomes has been demonstrated directly in recent studies. One study noted that a western diet with low fruit and vegetable consumption may link to higher infection susceptibility and worse COVID-19 outcomes in Black and other minority communities, exacerbating a long-standing problem existing even before COVID-19 arrival in the US.

Considering the link between nutrition and chronic disease discussed above, underlying disease itself has been associated with greater COVID-19 disease burden. For instance, one study noted that Black Americans and other minority groups "have a disproportionate burden of chronic disease, SARS-CoV-2 infection, and COVID-19 diagnosis, hospitalization, and mortality", demonstrating how co-occurrence of chronic disease can adversely affect Black Americans. US Surgeon General Jerome Adams described this intersection of factors in a video released by his office:

Number 1 -- [Black] people, unfortunately, are likely to be of low socioeconomic status, which makes it harder to social distance,

Number 2 -- We know that Blacks are more likely to have diabetes, heart disease, lung disease ...

I've shared myself personally that I have high blood pressure, that I have heart disease and spent a week in the ICU due to a heart condition, that I actually have asthma and I'm prediabetic, and so I represent that legacy of growing up poor and Black in America.

===== Association with physical and built environment =====
To address the question of why some racial groups are disproportionately affected by COVID-19, the CDC compiled a list of factors linking a racial group to increased risk of COVID-19 exposure. These factors are well-linked to the social determinants of health, the social contributors that influence health outcomes for a particular group. These factors include:

1. Physical environment, including social factors and residence in areas of high COVID-19 incidence
2. Housing, and in specific their built environment
3. Occupation, particularly because racial minorities are over-represented in essential service occupations
4. Education and income, linking to pre-existing disparities

Specific to the physical and built environment, early during the COVID-19 pandemic, social distancing was heavily encouraged to minimize spread of COVID-19. Naturally, these burden fell hardest on minority groups who are more constrained in their built environment. Racial and ethnic minority groups have long been affected by challenges in finding affordable housing, partitioning them into regions that are often contain more buildings built upwards with less green space. Often, these build environments suffer from overcrowding, and individuals tend to live in multi-generational homes, which makes it difficult to maintain adequate social distancing. Furthermore, studies have found a link between air pollution, socioeconomic status, and racial group, suggesting that air pollution unevenly contributes to poor health in areas where minorities live.

==== Mortality rate ====
The disproportionate impacts on Black Americans has been manifest by dramatically increased mortality rates compared to other racial groups.

From data publicly available in April 2020, Black Americans averaged 6.3 deaths per 100,000 people, far greater than the 1.1 deaths per 100,000 for White Americans. More detailed statistical analysis conducted in October 2020 revealed a significant increase in mortality rate for Black (1.9%) vs non-Black (0.8%) participants, and even after adjusting for age the mortality rate disproportionately affected Black participants. Even more recently in September 2021, the Hamilton Project at the Brookings Institution tabulated that Black mortality rate due to COVID-19 was almost 1.5x that of White Americans. They argue that not only does increased mortality rates affect life expectancy for Black Americans, it also threatens their recovery from COVID-19-related damages.

==== Association with economic stability ====
Even prior to the COVID-19 pandemic, the Black-White wealth gap was pronounced, with many studies discussing its magnitude. Data from the Center for American Progress demonstrates that Black Americans, with less in way of savings, were harder hit economically by the pandemic-associated recession. Not only did the economic impacts have implications for long-term investment, they also affected quality and access to education during the pandemic, health outcomes, and retirement savings.

The Economic Policy Institute wrote that, especially early in the pandemic, there were three categories of workers: "[1.] those who have lost their jobs and face economic insecurity, [2.] those who are classified as essential workers and face health insecurity as a result, and [3.] those who are able to continue working from the safety of their homes". Further investigation found that Black Americans were losing their jobs at rates higher than White Americans, and those who retained their jobs were likely to be essential workers (namely working in healthcare facilities, farms, grocery stores, public transportation, and food production) exposed to higher health risks. In fact, almost 25% of Hispanic and Black Americans work in the service industry and 30% of nurses are Black Americans.

===== Association with social and work relationships =====
In October 2020, the KFF/Undefeated Survey on Race and Health found that 50% of Black respondents (compared to 42% White respondents) reported that they had lost a job or had their income reduced as a result of COVID-19. Moreover, 32% Black respondents reported that COVID-19 had a major impact on their ability to care for children (compared to 13% Whites) and 25% reported a major impact in their relationship with family members (compared to 12% Whites). These factors culminated in respondents stating that "it is a bad time to be Black in America".

These were not isolated findings. In April 2020, an analysis by the Center on Poverty and Social Policy at Columbia University found that working-age individuals, children, and Black Americans were most likely to fall into poverty due to COVID-19. A prominent nexus of these categories includes Black children, who are more likely than other groups to suffer long-term consequences from COVID-19.

===== Association with education access and quality =====
A number of studies have documented unequal access to online education due to internet connectivity, technology access, among other factors. These studies often bring attention to the inequalities in Black and White education quality, access, and outcomes, even before COVID-19.

Collectively, these many studies presented reflect themes of disproportionately decreased economic stability, job layoffs or employment in dangerous working conditions, worsened social relationships, and poorer educational outcomes for Black Americans.

==== Availability of vaccines ====
The New York Times reported in October 2022 that many Black and Latino communities had limited access to Covid vaccines when they became available at the end of 2020. The Biden administration provided vaccines from state stockpiles to community health clinics, put federal clinics in those communities, and "helped local organizations set up clinics at churches, barbershops and beauty salons." By the end of 2021, Covid death rates among Black and Latino Americans were generally lower than those of white Americans.

=== Indigenous Americans ===
In 2020 and 2021, after two years of the pandemic, Native Americans and Alaska Natives experienced a precipitous drop in life expectancy to 65 years of age, which was a loss of more than 6.5 years since 2019. On par with the average American life expectancy in 1944 and lower than every country in the Americas except Haiti, this decrease in life expectancy was the worst among all racial groups in the United States. High rates of diabetes and obesity, combined with crowded multigenerational housing, added significantly to the risk of higher mortality among U.S. indigenous populations.

=== Latino Americans ===
Latino Americans have a greater propensity for infection than White Americans.

Latino Americans have also suffered a greater decrease in life expectancy. While the projected life expectancy of White people declined by 0.73 years, the drop for Latino people was more than a factor of 4 greater, at 3.28 years.

=== Filipino Americans ===
Filipino Americans have been impacted by COVID-19 perhaps more than any ethnic community in the United States. This is because a significant proportion of nurses in critical care and emergency rooms are Filipino-American. This demographic also makes up a higher percentage of essential workers in the United States compared to Black and Hispanic Americans.

=== General trends ===
Several studies have investigated why there were disparities in infection and mortality rate during COVID. One study looked at patterns of COVID testing and mortality by race and ethnicity in veterans. The study found that Black and Hispanic individuals were twice as likely to test positive for COVID, even after adjusting for underlying conditions, geographic location, and other demographics. As a result, the researchers found that age, rural or urban residence, and place of care were better predictors of disparity.

However, another study found that the gaps in COVID incidence and mortality cannot be explained by population age or sex distribution. Instead, they mentioned that the disparities could be attributed to underlying chronic illnesses that predispose individuals to mortality, lack of access to healthcare, as well as variations in community, household, and workplace exposure.

One article by Rohan Khazanchi, Charlesnika Evans, and Jasmine Marcelin pulled two studies to determine why there were racial disparities in COVID. The studies used shared the result of socioeconomic status and comorbidity burdens being the reason for COVID-19 racial disparities. Both came to the understanding that Black and Hispanic individuals were disproportionately affected by low socioeconomic status and comorbidity burdens.

A common thread is that race as a biological factor is not the cause for racial disparities in COVID, but that societal racism in the environment Black and Hispanic live and work in is a strong cause for the disparities present.

=== Impact of COVID-19 over time ===
On April 4, 2020, the CDC reported the number of cases per 100,000 people. Non-Hispanic White people had the lowest amount with 17.80 per 100,000 while Hispanic and non-Hispanic Black people had the highest with 52.6 and 49.73 per 100,000 respectively. When looking at deaths per 100,000 for the same day, American Indians had the lowest amount with 1.3 per 100,000, followed by White people with 3.07 per 100,000, ending with Black people with 7.10 per 100,000 people.

== Financial and economic toll ==
In addition to the health tolls that individuals faced, there was also a financial and economic toll that was disproportionate for racial and ethnic minorities. Pre-COVID, there were inequities in receiving higher education which then led to limited, lower paying, or less stable job opportunities. With these jobs, there were less options for paid sick leave, making it difficult to take off of work if an individual was sick.

When the pandemic hit, racial and ethnic minorities were impacted more than their white counterparts. A poll conducted by the Washington Post in 2020 found that Hispanic people were twice as likely to be laid off as their white counterparts. The CDC reported that as of August 2020, "more Hispanic or Latino people (53%) and non-Hispanic Black people (43%) reported that they had lost a job or taken a pay cut because of COVID-19 compared with non-Hispanic White people (38%). More non-Hispanic Black and Hispanic or Latino people, 40% and 43%, respectively, reported that they had to use money from savings or retirement to pay bills since the outbreak began, compared with 29% of non-Hispanic White people. Additionally, 43% of non-Hispanic Black people and 37% of Hispanic or Latino people reported having trouble paying their bills in full compared with non-Hispanic White people (18%)."

Overall, minority groups were more vulnerable due to their social and economic standing in the United States and faced more financial hardship during the pandemic. If comparing the pandemic to other disasters that impacted people of color (the Great Recession, Hurricane Katrina, etc.), it can be expected that racial and ethnic minority groups who are more socially and economically disadvantaged will be slower to recover due to their standing.

== Racism and xenophobia ==
During the COVID-19 pandemic, Asian Americans have faced racism and anti-Asian rhetoric in addition to the danger of the pandemic to everyone. Asian Americans have faced scape-goating and xenophobia due to anti-Chinese rhetoric. According to Human Rights Watch, racism and xenophobia were encouraged by government officials such as former President Donald Trump calling COVID the "Chinese virus."

== COVID-19 vaccines ==
Some groups have historically mistrusted medical practices and new medical procedures. As COVID vaccines became more prevalent, there was a push to get the vaccine to disproportionately affected groups. However, White people were receiving higher rates of vaccination even though the pandemic disproportionately affected people of color. Across the United States, Black and Hispanic people have received fewer vaccines in relation to their COVID cases and deaths. Across 43 states, White people had a vaccination rate of 1.7 times higher than Hispanic people and 1.6 times higher than Black people.
