= Rue Saint-Denis =

Rue Saint-Denis may refer to:

- Rue Saint-Denis (Montreal)
- Rue Saint-Denis (Paris)
