= 2024 in Libya =

- Decades: 2000s; 2010s; 2020s
- See also: Other events of 2024; List of years in Libya

Events in Libya in 2024.

== Incumbents ==
- President: Mohamed al-Menfi
- Prime Minister: Contested Abdul Hamid Dbeibeh (GNU) Osama Hammad (GNS)

== Events ==
=== April ===
- 16 April – Abdoulaye Bathily resigns as United Nations envoy to Libya, citing a "lack of political will and good faith" by politicians in the country.

=== May ===
- 18 May – One person is killed during clashes between militias loyal to the Government of National Unity in Zawiya.

=== July ===
- 22 July - Clashes break out in Balanja between Sudanese militia units stationed in Libya.
- 23 July - Chad repatriates 157 citizens detained in Libya, with more repatriation flights planned to return all detained Chadians.
- 28 July - A court in Derna convicts 12 city officials for mismanagement, negligence and other offences that contributed to the Derna dam collapses in 2023 and sentences them to between nine and 27 years' imprisonment.

=== August ===
- 9 August – Nine people are killed during clashes between rival militias in Tripoli.
- 18 August:
  - Musab Msallem, the IT director of the Central Bank of Libya, is abducted from his residence in Tripoli, prompting the bank to suspend operations while he is not released.
  - Sadiq al-Kabir is dismissed as governor of the Central Bank of Libya by the Presidential Council and is replaced by Mohamed Abdul Salam al-Shukri. Kabir later flees the country, citing threats by militias.
- 26 August – The Government of National Stability shuts down oil production and exportation in areas it holds, citing "force majeure" related to the ongoing problems in the Central Bank.
- 27 August – United States Africa Command General Michael Langley meets with top Libyan National Army officials, including Khalifa Haftar, in Benghazi, to help mediate an end to the political crisis.

=== September ===
- 1 September – Abdel-Rahman Milad, a Libyan Coast Guard commander based in Zawiya who was sanctioned by the UN for his role in human trafficking, is shot dead inside his vehicle in Tripoli.
- 3 September – A boat carrying migrants capsizes near Tobruk, killing one person and leaving 22 others missing. Nine passengers are rescued.
- 30 September – The House of Representatives unanimously appoints Naji Mohamed Issa Belqasem as governor of the Central Bank, after United Nations-mediated talks with the High Council of State and Presidential Council.

=== October ===
- 3 October – The National Oil Corporation resumes oil production from the El Sharara and El-Feel oil fields, as well as oil exportation from the port of Sidra following their "force majeure" shutdown in August.
- 4 October – The International Criminal Court unseals arrest warrants for six individuals wanted for committing war crimes in Tarhuna during the Second Libyan Civil War.
- 28 October – A boat carrying migrants bound for Europe from Egypt sinks off the coast of Tobruk, killing all but one of the 13 passengers on board.

=== November ===
- 6 November – Brigadier General Mustafa al-Whayshi, the head of the Central Security Department, is abducted, triggering protests and disruptions to oil production in Zintan.
- 16 November – Local elections are held in 58 municipalities nationwide, marking the first time the vote was held simultaneously in the eastern and western halves of the country since 2014.
- 28 November – A rubber boat carrying migrants deflates off the coast of Libya, leaving 28 passengers missing after they were taken by unidentified gunmen on speedboats during rescue efforts.

=== December ===
- 15 December - The main refinery in Zawiya is shut down after clashes between local militias cause fires to the building's infrastructure.

== Holidays ==
- 17 February - Revolution Day
- 19 March – Commemoration of the Victory over Gaddafi
- 10–13 April – Little Feast
- 15–19 June – Feast of the Sacrifice
- 7 July – Islamic New Year
- 15 September – The Prophet's Birthday
- 16 September – Martyrs' Day
- 23 October – Liberation Day
- 24 December – Independence Day
