= Rue Saint-Denis (Paris) =

Street in Paris, France

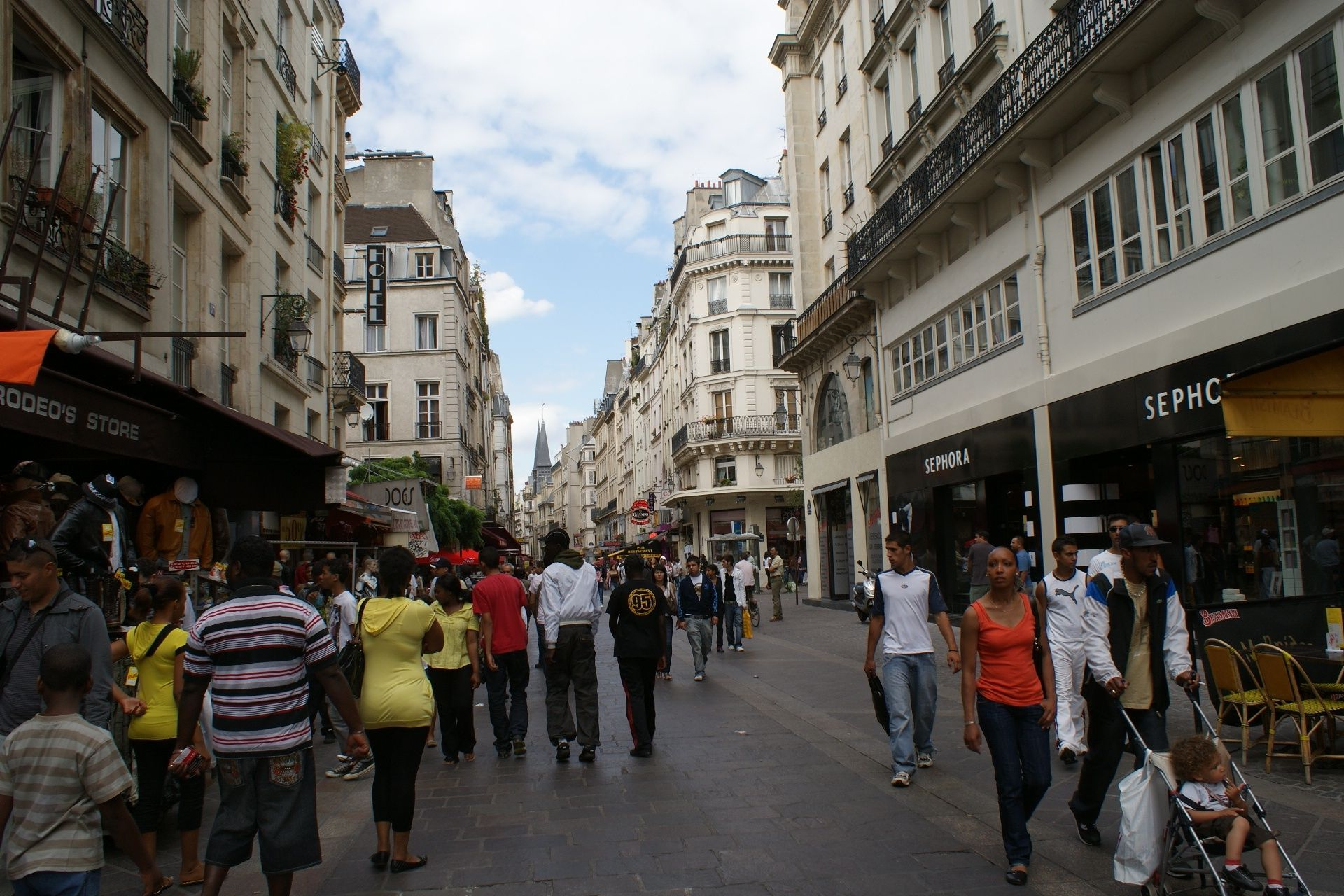
- Pedestrian Rue Saint Denis in Les Halles district

- Location within Paris
- Length: 1,334 m (4,377 ft)
- Width: 1,630 m (5,350 ft)
- Arrondissement: 1st, 2nd
- Quarter: Quartier Saint-Germain l'Auxerrois Saint-Germain l'Auxerrois, Halles, Quartier Bonne-Nouvelle
- Coordinates: 48°51′51″N 2°21′0″E
- From: Avenue Victoria
- To: Boulevard de Bonne Nouvelle

Construction
- Completion: 1st century

The Rue Saint-Denis (French pronunciation: [ʁy sɛ̃ dəni]) is one of the oldest streets in Paris. Its route was first laid out in the 1st century by the Romans, and then extended to the north in the Middle Ages. From the Middle Ages to the present day, the street has been notorious as a place of prostitution. Its name derives from it being the historic route to Saint-Denis.

The street extends as far as the 1st arrondissement and the Rue de Rivoli to the south and as far as the 2nd arrondissement and the Boulevard Saint-Denis to the north. It runs parallel to the Boulevard de Sébastopol.

== History ==
The ancient Roman route (Flanders road) leading to Saint-Denis, Pontoise and Rouen competed with the Route de Senlis (Rue Saint-Martin) but gained an advantage over it with the demolition of the Grand Pont (see Pont au Change) and the development of the royal Abbey of Saint-Denis, becoming the triumphal way for royal entries into the capital. For this reason, it was also known as the rue Royale.

Flanked by houses from 1134 onward, the street has borne the alternative names of Sellerie de Paris and Sellerie de la Grande Rue (13th century), Grand'rue de Paris, Grande rue, Rue des Saints Innocents, and Grande chaussée de Monsieur/Monseigneur Saint-Denis (14th century). During the French Revolution, it was known as the Rue de Franciade.

The street was one of the centres of the June Rebellion of 1832, immortalised in Victor Hugo's novel Les Misérables, and which is referred to in the book as the "Epic of the Rue Saint-Denis". The street contains clothes shops, bars and restaurants, the church of Saint-Leu-Saint-Gilles, a bank, and the Chambre des notaires building.

== Prostitution ==
For many decades, the Rue Saint-Denis and its surrounding neighborhood were famous for the prostitution trade that took place there. Sex shops also were situated between the Rue Réaumur and the Boulevard Saint-Denis.

== Famous buildings ==
- No. 60 (corner of the Rue de la Cossonnerie): Remains of the Cour Batave, a collection of buildings constructed for Dutch speculators by Jean-Nicolas Sobre and Célestin-Joseph Happe in 1790, one of Paris's first examples of private housing development.
- No. 92 : Église Saint-Leu-Saint-Gilles
- No. 142 (corner of the Rue Grénéta): House built in 1732 by Jacques-Richard Cochois for Claude Aubry. Attached to it is the "Fontaine Greneta", rebuilt at the same time as the house, but whose original dates back to at least 1502.
- Nos. 224–226: Maison des Dames de Saint-Chaumont (Couvent des Filles de l'Union chrétienne), established in 1685 in a Hôtel de Saint-Chaumond, of which nothing survives except its name in the name of the community. The nuns had constructed 1734–1735 by Jacques Hardouin-Mansart de Sagonne a lodge which has been conserved (but raised up), a building of exceptional quality decorated by Nicolas Pineau. It is the only survivor of the many pious or charitable establishments built along the Rue Saint-Denis. Its simple entrance is next to the Boulevard de Sébastopol and a garden extends between the building and the street. In the corner of the Rue de Tracy could be found the convent's chapel, built in 1782 by Pierre Convers in the ancient style but now lost.
- At the end of the Rue Saint-Denis, at the intersection of the Grands Boulevards, can be found the Porte Saint-Denis. The Rue Saint-Denis then extends out into what was medieval Paris's faubourg by the Rue du Faubourg-Saint-Denis
