= Franciade =

Day added to French Republican calendars for solar alignment

In the French Republican calendar, the franciade was the period of four years at the end of which it was necessary to add a day to the calendar year to keep it aligned with the solar year (c. 365 1/4 days).

The franciade was defined in 1793 in article 10 of the Décret de la Convention nationale portant sur la création du calendrier républicain, as follows:

The period of 4 years, at the end of which this addition of one day is usually necessary, is named the franciade, in memory of the revolution which, after 4 years of toils, led France to its Republican government.

La période de quatre ans, au bout de laquelle cette addition d'un jour est ordinairement nécessaire, est appelée la franciade, en mémoire de la révolution qui, après quatre ans d'efforts, a conduit la France au gouvernement républicain.

The day that was thus added at the end of the jours complémentaires was called the jour de la révolution (Revolution Day).

Franciade was also the name given to Saint-Denis on October 21, 1793 by the National Convention after the people of Saint-Denis requested it.
