= Public holidays in Libya =

This is a list of public holidays in Libya.

== Public holidays ==
Date	English name	Local Arabic name	Remarks
17 February	February 17 Revolution Day	يوم ثورة 17 فبراير	The start of the Libyan Revolution on 17 February 2011.
1 May	Labour Day	عيد العمال	Celebrates the achievements of workers.
16 September	Martyrs' Day	يوم الشهيد	Remembers Libyans killed or exiled under Italian rule and those who are killed in the February 17 Revolution Day.
23 October	Liberation Day	يوم التحرير	Day of Liberation from Gaddafi's Jamahiriya declared on 23 October 2011.
24 December	Independence Day	عيد الاستقلال	Anniversary of Libyan independence in 1951.

In addition, the following Muslim holidays, which may take place according to the Islamic Calendar (Hijri year), are observed as public holidays:

Date	English name	Local Arabic name	Description
1st Muharram	Islamic New Year	رأس السنة الهجرية	Islamic New Year (also known as: Hijri New Year).
12th Rabiul Awwal	The Prophet's Birthday	المولد النبوي	Commemorates Muhammad's Birthday, celebrated in most parts of the Muslim world.
1st, 2nd, 3rd Shawwal	End of Ramadan	عيد الفطر	Commemorates end of Ramadan.
9th Zulhijjah	Arafat Day	يوم عرفة	The peak of the Hajj pilgrimage season and the eve of the Eid-ul-Adha celebrations.
10th, 11th, 12th Zulhijjah	Feast of Sacrifice	عيد الأضحى	Commemorates Ibrahim's willingness to sacrifice his son. Also known as the Big Feast (celebrated from the 10th to 12th).

== See also ==
- Day of Revenge, historical
