= Human rights issues related to the COVID-19 pandemic =

The public health measures associated with the COVID-19 pandemic effectively contained and reduced the spread of the SARS-CoV-2 virus on a global scale between 2020–2023, and had several other positive effects on the natural environment of planet Earth and human societies as well, including improved air quality and oxygen levels due to reduced air and water pollution, lower crime rates across the world, and less frequent violent crimes perpetrated by violent non-state actors, such as ISIS and other Islamic terrorist organizations.

The World Health Organization (WHO) has stated that stay-at-home responses for slowing the pandemic, such as the quarantine mandates, should not be implemented at the expense of human rights. Broader concerns have been expressed about the effect of COVID-19 containment measures on human rights, democracy, and governance. Numerous experts report that various issues intersect, and are no longer an issue of only one category.

== Freedom of speech and expression ==
Based on a Freedom House report, at least 91 countries experienced restrictions on the news media as part of their response to the COVID-19 pandemic, with these restrictions occurring in 62% of 'Partly Free countries' and 67% of 'Not Free countries.' Furthermore, they also reported that additional government restrictions on free speech have been imposed in at least 72 countries.

=== Azerbaijan ===
Human Rights Watch reported that at least 6 activists and pro-opposition journalists have been detained following criticising the governments response to the pandemic, accusing them of abusing the restrictions to silence political opposition.

=== Bangladesh ===
The Government of Bangladesh has been accused of using the virus as a way to crack down on government critics. In May 2020, Human Rights Watch reported that 11 people, including bloggers, cartoonists and journalists, were arrested for their reporting of the pandemic.

=== China ===
The government of China enforced early censorship to suppress information about COVID-19 and the dangers it poses to public health. There were criticisms that the epidemic was allowed to spread for weeks before efforts were undertaken to contain the virus. Li Wenliang, a Chinese doctor who alerted his colleagues about COVID-19 was censored and then detained for "spreading false rumors". He later succumbed to the virus after being infected by a patient. Amnesty International criticized that China's aggressive lobbying of the WHO included minimizing the severity of the outbreak.

Plague Inc., a mobile game that focuses on the simulation of global pandemics, was banned by the Cyberspace Administration of China on the grounds that it had "illegal content" and was promptly removed from all Chinese digital stores. Ndemic Creations, the game developer, said that it is unclear whether this was in connection to the COVID-19 pandemic, but that they had planned to work hard to get their game back into Chinese players' hands.

=== Israel ===
On 3 October 2020, tens of thousands of Israelis came on streets in hundreds of regions across Israel, amidst a COVID-19 lockdown, to protest following the parliament's approval to a new law that curbed anti-government protests. People were barred from conducting such demonstrations more than 1 km from their homes, under the new law, which forced stricter social distancing rules. Critics called it a blow to freedom of speech. The demonstrations flouted the law, as it kept pressure on PM Benjamin Netanyahu over his handling of the pandemic and allegations of corruption.

=== Poland ===
An experienced midwife working during the pandemic in a Polish hospital was fired after she published a report on Facebook on 18 March about the conditions of medical personnel and the hospital in relation to the pandemic. Reports came out afterwards that doctors were being forbidden from providing information to the media. On 25 March 2020, the Polish Ombudsman Adam Bodnar informed the Minister of Health that medical staff's freedom of speech and the public's right to know are guaranteed under Articles 2, 54 and 61 of the Polish Constitution and that firing or punishing doctors for informing the public during the pandemic could be a violation of the "obligatory standards".

On 26 March, Poland's secretary of state of the Ministry of Health, Józefa Szczurek-Żelazko, published a written statement forbidding voivodeship medical consultants from making statements related to COVID-19 unless they first consulted with the Ministry of Health or Główny Inspektorat Sanitarny (GIS, the national health agency). A doctors' group, Porozumieniu Chirurgów SKALPEL, described the order as blackmail and said that it risked catastrophe.

=== Turkey ===
Law enforcement agencies detained 19 social media users whose posts were "unfounded and provocative", causing panic and fear according to the officials. Some newspapers considered these actions to be censorship. As of 6 April, at least seven journalists, who were each reporting for local media, were detained for how they covered the pandemic, and the state media watchdog had fined at least three channels for their coverage of the outbreak, including the mainstream channel Habertürk, which was penalized after its medical expert stated that the low level of testing and the high rate of transmission of the virus meant there were many undiagnosed cases, greatly exceeding the government's confirmed case figures.

Due to the COVID-19 pandemic, the Turkish parliament accepted a bill which could enable the release of up to 100,000 prisoners, including people responsible for deaths. However, the law excludes Turkey's around 50,000 political prisoners, including journalists and human rights defenders, who are said to remain jailed despite overcrowding and unsanitary living conditions already posing severe health threat.

=== Turkmenistan ===
The government of Turkmenistan outlawed the word "coronavirus" on media.

=== Social networks ===
Various social networks applied anti-spam measures for content posted about SARS-CoV-2 and the pandemic. Facebook allegedly censored informative content about the virus. According to users, posts about COVID-19 from reliable sources of media were blocked and hidden from other users. Facebook claimed a bug was responsible for this, but conspiracies are circulating that this was done deliberately to suppress information.

YouTube demonetized several videos in which the term "corona" was used. The demonetization was cited under the rules of sensitive content.

== Right to health ==
The pandemic revealed deep inequities in capacity and access.

=== China ===
In China, many patients had to be turned away from hospitals after hours of queuing due to the high number of ill people. Shortage of testing and treating material were reported.

=== Italy ===
Due to the high volume of patient inflow in Italy, doctors were forced to decide on whether or not to treat the elderly, or leave them to die. A photo of a nurse who collapsed due to huge workload in an Italian hospital was widely circulated as a symbol of the overwhelmed system.

=== Libya ===
In Libya, the medical situation was worsening amidst the ongoing war, where hospitals were constantly being attacked. In April 2020, the UN humanitarian coordinator for Libya, Yacoub El Hillo confirmed that 27 health facilities have been damaged and 14 close in five weeks. On April 6, UAE-backed forces of Khalifa Haftar launched a Grad rocket attack against the Al Khadra General Hospital and damaged the 400-bed facility, where 300 patients, including two COVID-19 patients, were being treated. The attack was condemned as a violation of international humanitarian law by Yacoub El Hillo.

=== Russian Federation ===
Specialized hospitals were transferred for patients with respiratory infectious diseases. This has worsened the availability of medical care for patients with various serious diseases. According to the team of experts, this caused an increase in mortality that was many times higher than the death rate from pneumonia.

== Freedom from discrimination ==
=== Racism and xenophobia ===
There have been increased reports of racism against Asian people, particularly against Chinese people in Europe and the Americas. The World Health Organization's Emergency Committee issued a statement advising all countries to be mindful of the "principles of Article 3 of the IHR (the International Health Regulations)," which the WHO says is a caution against "actions that promote stigma or discrimination," when conducting national response measures to the outbreak.

A Washington Post staff photographer captured a snapshot of US President Donald Trump's speech notes in which he had crossed out the word "coronavirus" and replaced it with the words "Chinese virus." Trump referred to COVID-19 as "Chinese virus" in his speeches amidst growing protests of racism from different quarters. However, he stated that he does not believe his statements were racist because the virus originated there, and he also stated that he was intending to counter Chinese propaganda which claimed that American soldiers originally brought the virus to China.

India has seen many cases of people from its north-east parts being called 'coronavirus' because of their racial similarities to the people of China, the country where the pandemic originated. This is in the backdrop of existing problems of racism that people from these regions continue to face. Indian government's Minister for State for Minority Affairs, Kiren Rijiju made a statement against the increasing instances of racist comments against the people of North-east India.

In June 2020, a report in the United Kingdom highlighted that ethnic minorities are at a higher risk of losing their lives due to COVID-19. On 5 June, the Equality and Human Rights Commission (EHRC) announced to launch a statutory inquiry into racial inequalities, which have been exposed amidst a surge of COVID-19 cases in the UK. The human rights watchdog's investigation was to provide evidence-based information, compelled from government departments and organizations.

On June 30, an article from The Wall Street Journal revealed that the rates of hospitalization and death in America linked to COVID-19 have been observed to be higher for non-white groups even after adjusting for factors such as age and geography. In a report released by Centers for Disease Control and Prevention studying the COVID-19 hospitalizations among American children, it was found that 40% of the studied hospitalized children were Hispanic and 33% were Black. The study concluded that minority communities were more at risk due to systemic social inequalities, such as economic instability and insurance status.

=== Stigmatization ===
People have reported experiencing social stigma after recovering from the illness. Some healthcare workers caring for individuals with COVID-19 have also reported experiencing mental health difficulties due to the fear of being stigmatized by their family and community.

Shincheonji Church of Jesus, a religious minority group based in South Korea, and its related members have faced discrimination and harassment due to its link to an initial outbreak of COVID-19 in Daegu, South Korea. The church reported about 4,000 instances of discrimination against its members, including some being fired from their jobs and some being abused by their spouses.

In November 2020, the National Human Rights Commission of Korea and the Korea Insight Research Institute reported that there were 86,451 cases of online hate speech and expression targeted towards Shincheonji, between February 2020 and May 2020, on various social media platforms, online community boards, and blogs, blaming Shincheonji for the spread of COVID-19. There were two incidents of women driven to suicide as a result of COVID-19 blaming and discrimination against Shincheonji members. On February 26, a female Shincheonji member was reportedly being attacked by her husband who was trying to compel her to leave Shincheonji, and died after falling from her seventh floor apartment. On May 4, a 42-year-old female Shincheonji congregation member, who was a victim of spousal abuse allegedly due to her affiliation with Shincheonji, died after falling from her 11th floor apartment.

=== Non-discrimination ===
On 17 April 2020, OSCE High Commissioner on National Minorities issued a document called "Streamlining diversity: COVID-19 measures that support social cohesion". The document included recommendations to the OSCE participating States were included on how the governmental responses to COVID-19 could ensure inclusiveness and be sensitive to social diversity. Key principles included: upholding human rights, being inclusive and sensitive to language needs, and also maintaining zero tolerance for discrimination and xenophobia.

== Access to Justice ==
Public health measures enacted during COVID-19 meant that courts either had to cease operations completely or adopt measures to socially distance. Access to justice therefore became a concern during the pandemic as people's ability to report issues to law enforcement or to access courts were limited.

== Freedom of information ==
=== Suppression of information ===
Amnesty International reports that the Chinese government has censored numerous articles related to the COVID-19 pandemic in China. Nicholas Bequelin, Regional Director at Amnesty International has criticized that "the Chinese authorities risk withholding information that could help the medical community tackle the coronavirus and help people protect themselves from being exposed to it".

Twitter blocked the sharing of a post, published by Brazil's Ministry of Health on January 13, 2021, which urged people to seek early treatment for COVID-19 infections. The Ministry's tweet advised: "To combat Covid-19, the guideline is not to wait. The sooner treatment is started, the greater the chances of recovery. So, stay tuned! When showing symptoms of Covid-19, # Don't Wait, go to a Health Unit and request early treatment." In blocking the tweet, Twitter said: "This Tweet violated the Twitter Rules about spreading misleading and potentially harmful information related to COVID-19."

== Freedom from arbitrary arrest and detention ==
Activists sharing information about the COVID-19 epidemiological situation in China were intimidated and harassed. In the United States, the Department of Justice reached to Congress for the ability to ask chief judges to detain people indefinitely without trial during emergencies — part of a push for new powers that came as COVID-19 initially spread throughout the United States.

On May 15, the UN High Commissioner for Human Rights Michelle Bachelet warned that the emergency powers and lockdowns imposed amidst the COVID-19 pandemic has been exploited by some governments. Taking advantage of the situation, the aforementioned governments were attempting to silence dissidents and to curb political foes, human rights activists and journalists. She also stated that the response to the crisis should be "driven by science-based facts", rather than politics or the economy.

In their report 'Democracy under lockdown', Freedom House research found evidence of police violence against civilians in at least 59 countries, and detentions and arrests linked to the pandemic response in at least 66 countries. Examples of this include Kenya, whose police are accused of beating and teargassing people on their way home from work, and Zimbabwe, whose government has been accused by Amnesty International of using the pandemic as justification for cracking down on human rights activists.

=== Detention of migrants, refugees and asylum seekers ===
Several countries have unlawfully and arbitrarily held migrants, refugees and asylum-seekers in detention, constituting a violation of international law and human rights. Amnesty International criticized the governments of the United States, Mexico, Canada, Curaçao, and Trinidad and Tobago for continuing to "collectively detain tens of thousands of adults, families, and children in immigration detention facilities" amid COVID-19.

== Freedom of movement ==
=== Border control and quarantine ===
==== Turkmenistan ====
Border service of Turkmenistan received an online training on "management of border crossing points (BCP) in the context of the global fight against the COVID-19 pandemic". The event was organized by OSCE Centre in Ashgabat together with WHO Country Office in Turkmenistan, the WHO Regional Office for Europe, the Ministry of Healthcare, and the Medical Industry of Turkmenistan.

==== Australia ====
The Australian government sent hundreds of Australians evacuated from Wuhan in February 2020 to an immigration detention centre on Christmas Island, where the conditions were previously described as "inhumane" by the Australian Medical Association. The evacuees later reported that while they were concerned about the treatment they would receive before arriving at Christmas Island, they described the arrangements for their period in quarantine at the centre as being good.

In October 2020 Human Rights Watch stated that the strict domestic border closure imposed by the Government of Western Australia was "causing undue hardship for families". The organisation recommended that "the government should make more exceptions for compassionate cases, prioritize family reunions, provide greater transparency about the approval process, and provide clearer explanations to people who have been refused permission to return to their home state".

The academics Jane McAdam and Ben Saul raised concerns in December 2020 that the restrictions placed on the numbers of Australians who were able to enter the country and the way places in the hotel quarantine program were being allocated could constitute a violation of human rights.

==== Argentina ====
In Argentina, a state of emergency has restricted fundamental constitutional rights (personal freedom, freedom of movement, freedom of assembly), and militarized public space. No legal challenges to the measures are known. The Supreme Court of Argentina has extended its annual judicial leave, restricting access to justice.

== Freedom of assembly ==
Restrictions on movement, including lockdowns, influenced the expression of freedom of assembly by imposing a limit of people that could meet at each gathering, or banning any gathering outright.

== Freedom of religion ==
Lockdown restrictions in certain countries imposed a limit of practitioners attending a religious ceremony.

Authorities in some countries allowed the Muslim call to prayer to be heard from minarets during Ramadan. In Austria, Poland, France and a few other European countries, officials imposed face covering as a protective measure, while a few years earlier denied the right to cover the face by Muslim women who wished to do so as part of religious clothing.

== Right to privacy ==
Governments in many countries have been conducting mass surveillance in order to carry out contact tracing of the disease spread and its carriers. In China, government installed CCTV at the doors of quarantined individuals to ensure that they don't leave. Some residents in Hong Kong were made to wear a wrist-band linked to a smartphone app for alerting the authorities if the person broke quarantine. In some parts of India, passengers were stamped with indelible ink on their hands, the date until the person should remain in quarantine.

On May 13, 2020, Human Rights Watch reported that mobile location tracking applications that governments around the globe are using to counter COVID-19 crisis, pose human rights risk. The rights group alleged that the utility of such programs was still questionable and with easy access to user's geopolitical location and proximity information, disproportionate surveillance can threaten their personal privacy. On May 18, 2020, the Scottish Human Rights Commission wrote a letter to Holyrood's Justice Committee highlighting the grave conditions inside Scotland prisons during the pandemic. In its letter, the commission argued that the present status could lead to inhumane treatment of inmates, which is in breach of article 3 of the European Convention on Human Rights. The commission's chair said: "People in prison are likely to be more vulnerable to the risks and impacts of COVID-19. Closed conditions of detention make social distancing virtually impossible; many prisoners are currently living together in cells designed for one person; and prisoners are spending more time in their cells with no possibility of receiving a visit from their family."

On 1 July 2020, human rights organization and the ASEAN Intergovernmental Commission on Human Rights (AICHR) sent an open letter to the Indonesian government to issue a regulation on its COVID-19 contact tracing efforts, including on the data collected and how the data should be treated to protect privacy of individuals.

== Violations in prisons ==
On 10 April 2020, footage shared by Amnesty International revealed that detainees in a Cambodian prison are living in "inhumane conditions." With at least 25 prisoners lying on the floor of a single small cell, the prison is claimed to be extremely overcrowded and violates physical distancing requirements. It has been called a "ticking time bomb, especially during the coronavirus outbreak."

The quarantine measures amidst the COVID-19 pandemic severed the conditions in the unsanitary and overcrowded detention centers of Latin America. The unavailability of food, which is usually provided by the relatives of inmates, led to a new set of upheaval in a Venezuelan prison, inside the Los Llanos Penitentiary Centre (CEPELLA) in Guanare. The eruption of riot inside the prison killed at least 46 prisoners and injured over 70, including a national guard officer and a warden. Human rights groups, including the Amnesty International, called for the investigation and analyzation of the authorities' deadly response.

On May 19, 2020, 20 Human rights organizations sent a letter to the President of Tanzania John Magufuli requesting to take necessary steps to tackle COVID-19 situation in the congested prisons and also urged to ensure that the prisoners and detainees have proper access to a lawyer. The organizations that sent the letter includes, Legal and Human Rights Center in Dar es Salaam, Amnesty International, and Human Rights Watch.

On June 10, 2020, the Human Rights Watch called out the authorities in UAE to take urgent action ensuring the safety of prisoners in at least 3 detention centers amid COVID-19 pandemic. The relatives of the prisoners at al-Wathba prison, al-Awir prison, and new al-Barsha detention center, informed the HRW that some of the prisoners who were tested positive with COVID-19 and many prisoners with chronic health conditions were denied proper medical aid. The prisons are overcrowded and the authorities have not maintained hygiene and proper sanitation, worsening the spread of the virus.

On 20 July 2020, Human Rights Watch reported Egypt's prisons were experiencing surging cases with COVID-19 and had killed at least 14 detainees. Authorities sought to stifle news of the virus spreading within prisons and arresting health workers, journalists, and critics who raised their voice regarding concerns over the government's handling of the pandemic.

According to the report by a local human rights group, the leaked letter from 2 prisons and Human Rights Watch investigation, as of 15 July 2020 at least 10 detention facilities in Egypt have been infected with COVID-19 and about 14 prisoners have died after contracting the disease. The detainees have minimal access to medical care and no access to COVID-19 testing.

Despite Human Rights Watch warnings about the danger of unsanitary prison conditions in the US, the infection rate of prisoners was 5.5 times higher than that of the general population. Consequently, the death rate in prisons was higher compared to outside of prisons.

In December 2020, the Human Rights Watch revealed that Saudi Arabia was keeping thousands of African migrants under filthy conditions in its detention centers. Detainees, who were interviewed, reported that the Saudi authorities took no measures to control the spread of COVID-19 inside the prison, even though some of them inside the facility showed the COVID-19 symptoms.

A report released by Amnesty International highlighted torture and cruelty that the prisoners of conscience in Egyptian prisoners have been subjected to. The report, "What do I care if you die?" Negligence and denial of health care in the Egyptian prisons" was released on the 10th anniversary of the Arab uprising of 2011 in Egypt. Besides the torture of men and women arrested for demanding social and political justice, the Amnesty report also threw light on the negligence of health care measures for the protection of prisoners against the COVID-19 pandemic. Philip Luther, the Middle East and North Africa Research and Advocacy Director for Amnesty International told that the prison authorities let the prisoners rely on their families for food, medication, and basics like soap, and denied them medical care or timely transfer to the hospitals.

In June 2021, a prominent human rights activist of Bahrain, Husain Barakat (48) died in the country's Jau Prison after contracting Covid-19. He had been fully vaccinated in March 2021. The incident led to rare protests in the country, where hundreds gathered for demonstrations that held King Hamad bin Isa Al Khalifa responsible for Barakat's death due to improper care. Several human rights defenders and groups called it "systematic medical negligence", where the Bahraini government was accused of ignoring the scale of the problem. Despite the high vaccination rate, Bahrain was facing a significant surge in the COVID-19 cases. The country depended on China's Sinopharm BIBP vaccine which was incapable of inducing sufficient antibodies to protect from the virus.

== Minority rights ==
=== United States ===
In the United States, many minority racial and ethnic groups have been disproportionately affected by COVID-19.

Filipino-Americans have been disproportionately affected by COVID-19. Many Filipino Americans work as nurses in the ICU where COVID patients are treated, and many of them are not provided with PPE. Filipino Americans had a higher mortality rate, which has been attributed to their diet which has led to higher cases of obesity, high blood pressure and heart disease. In certain industries in Utah between March and June, it is found that Hispanic and non-white workers made up 73% of cases in workplace outbreaks. Hispanics are also financially impacted, experiencing a higher-than-national-average unemployment rate.

== Right to respect for private and family life ==
=== France ===
In Strasbourg and Lyon, administrative courts had overturned or limited local ordinances which prescribed a face mask wearing duty, but the French Council of State, France's supreme administrative court, upheld the regulations.

=== Germany ===
Many injunction motions against state decrees prescribing measures against the spread of SARS-2 have been filed with the German constitutional court in 2020, but all have been rejected either in form or content. In most cases, the plaintiffs had been referred to the regular administrative courts.

Among the provisions challenged were:

- Compulsory COVID-19 testing of people arriving from countries associated with a high risk of SARS-2 infection, challenged on grounds of bodily integrity and child custody.
- Physical distancing of schoolchildren in Bavaria, challenged on grounds of the right to education, the right to free development of personality, and the proportionality principle.
- Social distancing (contact restrictions), contact tracing, and the mandatory use of face masks have been challenged on grounds of proportionality.
- Quarantine for people entering or returning to Germany from countries outside Europe, challenged on grounds of the right to a fair trial.

== See also ==
- Impact of the COVID-19 pandemic on sports
- Impact of the COVID-19 pandemic on religion
- Impact of the COVID-19 pandemic on education
- Impact of the COVID-19 pandemic on cinema
