= Ashour Bourashed =

Libyan politician

Ashour Hamed Bourashed (Arabic: عاشور بو راشد) was a member of the Libyan National Transitional Council representing the city of Derna, where he was born. He served as Libya's ambassador to Egypt and the Arab League until his resignation on 3 January 2016. On 9 May 2025, he died in Benghazi after an unspecified illness.
