= Intersos =

International humanitarian organization

INTERSOS Humanitarian Aid Organization
- Formation: 1992
- Type: International NGO
- Purpose: Humanitarian aid
- Headquarters: Rome
- President: Mamadou Ndiaye
- General Director: Konstantinos Moschochoritis
- Budget: €109,436,392 (2022)
- Staff: 3,756 (2022)
- Website: https://www.intersos.org/en/

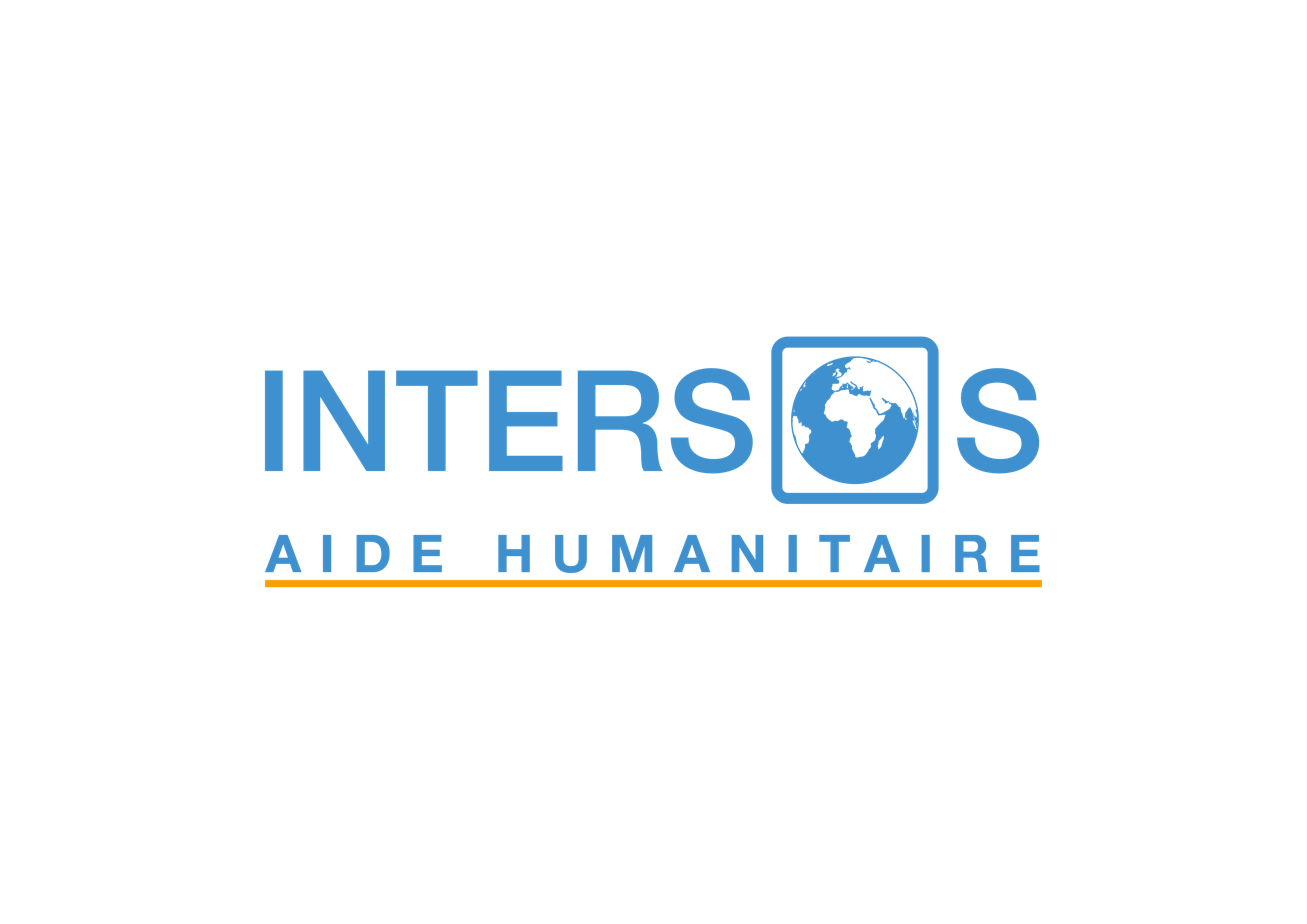
INTERSOS logo

INTERSOS is an international humanitarian organization, based in Italy, which intervenes in emergencies and crises to bring immediate aid to people whose lives are threatened by conflict, violence, extreme poverty, and natural or artificial disasters.

INTERSOS is an independent organization, partnering with numerous associations and organizations in the countries it operates and with major European and international institutions and agencies. It is a member of ICVA, VOICE, LINK 2007, enjoys consultative status in the United Nations Economic and Social Council and observer status at the International Organization for Migration.

In Greece, INTERSOS has established a partner organization, INTERSOS Hellas, which directly manages humanitarian programs in the country.

== History ==
INTERSOS was founded on 25 November 1992.

Initially, the organization operated in Somalia, starting its first project and acquiring the Jowhar Regional Hospital. Missions then expanded to Burundi and Rwanda, assisting Rwandan refugees and supporting the National Health System.

In subsequent years, INTERSOS expanded its reach, establishing the Mine Action Unit with demining operations in Bosnia, Angola, Afghanistan and Iraq. Humanitarian operations expanded to central and northern Bosnia, responding to the needs of the war-affected population, and Mozambique, facilitating the return of refugees from Malawi. In addition, INTERSOS offered support to Chechen refugees in Ingushetia and Chechnya and intervened in Albania with food distributions, infrastructure rehabilitation and health support.

The turn of the last century also saw INTERSOS engaged in food security projects in Angola, response to the drought emergency in Eritrea and humanitarian projects in Kosovo. Humanitarian missions expanded to Nicaragua in response to Hurricane Mitch, refugee assistance, repatriation, and medical rehabilitation.

In the early years of the 21st century, INTERSOS expanded its presence in Sudan, Chad, Lebanon, Yemen, Mauritania and the Democratic Republic of Congo, supporting displaced persons, responding to humanitarian emergencies, and contributing to post-earthquake reconstruction in Indonesia. The organization assisted Afghan refugees in Pakistan and responded to crises such as the hurricane in Haiti.

The next decade saw INTERSOS on new missions to Jordan, the Central African Republic, and Italy: here, it opened INTERSOS24 in Rome to protect vulnerable migrant women and minors from COVID-19.

The last few years have taken INTERSOS to Greece, Nigeria, Libya, Syria, and Niger and initiated intervention in Ukraine. It has supported the COVAX initiative for the equitable distribution of COVID-19 vaccines worldwide.

It is currently present in 23 countries.

Since 2015, Konstantinos Moschochoritis has been its Director General.

== Presidency ==
- Nino Sergi 1992 – 1996 (president emeritus)
- Raffaele Morese 1996 – 2009
- Marco Rotelli 2009 – 2022
- Mamadou Ndiaye since 2022

== Activities ==
INTERSOS runs projects, directly and in collaboration with other humanitarian organizations, to assist in humanitarian emergencies in Italy and abroad. The areas of intervention in which it operates are protection, water and hygiene, emergency distributions and shelters, health and nutrition, food security, and emergency education.

In Italy, it runs several projects to protect migrants, the individual and children through programs such as INTERSOS24, a "Safe Space & Child-Friendly Space" for women and children with a clinic in the Torre Spaccata area of Rome.

In addition, in 1997, INTERSOS set up a humanitarian mine clearance unit (first intervention in Bosnia and then Angola, Afghanistan and Iraq), which ended in 2007.
