= Sansculottides =

Holidays following the 12th month of the French Republican Calendar

- Observed by: Republicans
- Frequency: Annual

The Sansculottides (French pronunciation: [sɑ̃kylɔtid]; also Epagomènes; French: Sans-culottides, Sanculottides, jours complémentaires, jours épagomènes) are holidays following the last month of the year on the French Republican calendar which was used following the French Revolution from approximately 1793 to 1805.

The Sansculottides, named after the sans-culottes, append the twelve, 30-day months of the Republican Calendar with five complementary days in a common year or six complementary days in a leap year, so that the calendar year would approximately match the tropical year. They follow the last day of Fructidor, the last month of the year, and precede the first day of Vendémiaire.

Each of the Sansculottides were assigned as one of the ten days of the week. Even though the five or six days were less than a full week, the following 1 Vendémiaire would still be a primidi, skipping four or five days of the week. The Sansculottides belong to the summer quarter. They begin on 17 or 18 September and approximately the end on the autumn equinox, on 22 or 23 September on the Gregorian calendar.

Conversion between Republican and Gregorian calendar for the years I - XIV

1
Jours complémentaires
I

Jour de la vertu
Jour du génie
Jour du travail
Jour de l'opinion
Jour des récompenses

décade 37
1	Tuesday; 17 September 1793
2	Wednesday; 18 September 1793
3	Thursday; 19 September 1793
4	Friday; 20 September 1793
5	Saturday; 21 September 1793

10 h
8:69:96

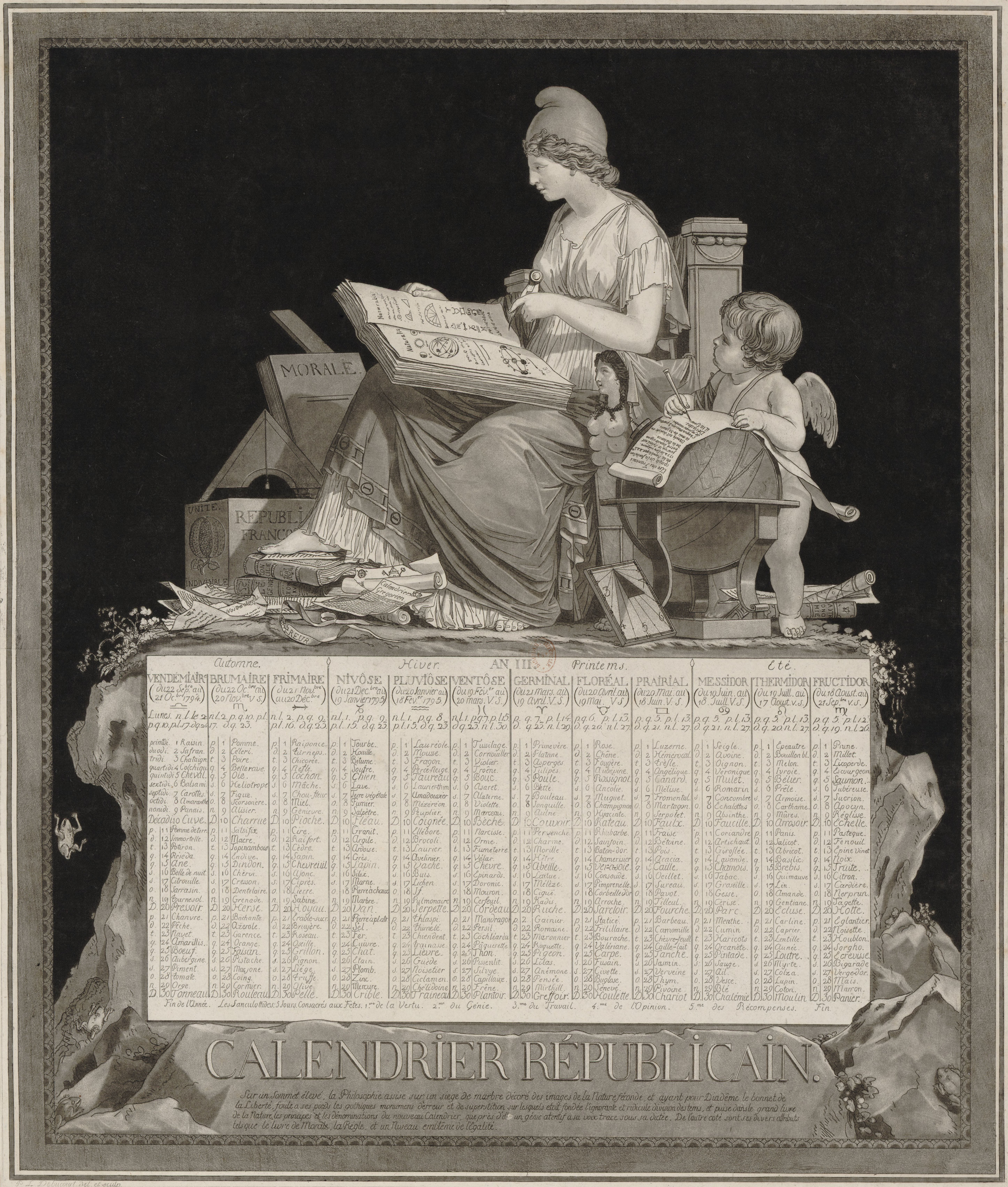

20:52:45
24 h

2
Jours complémentaires
II

Jour de la vertu
Jour du génie
Jour du travail
Jour de l'opinion
Jour des récompenses

décade 37
1	Wednesday; 17 September 1794
2	Thursday; 18 September 1794
3	Friday; 19 September 1794
4	Saturday; 20 September 1794
5	Sunday; 21 September 1794

10 h
8:69:96

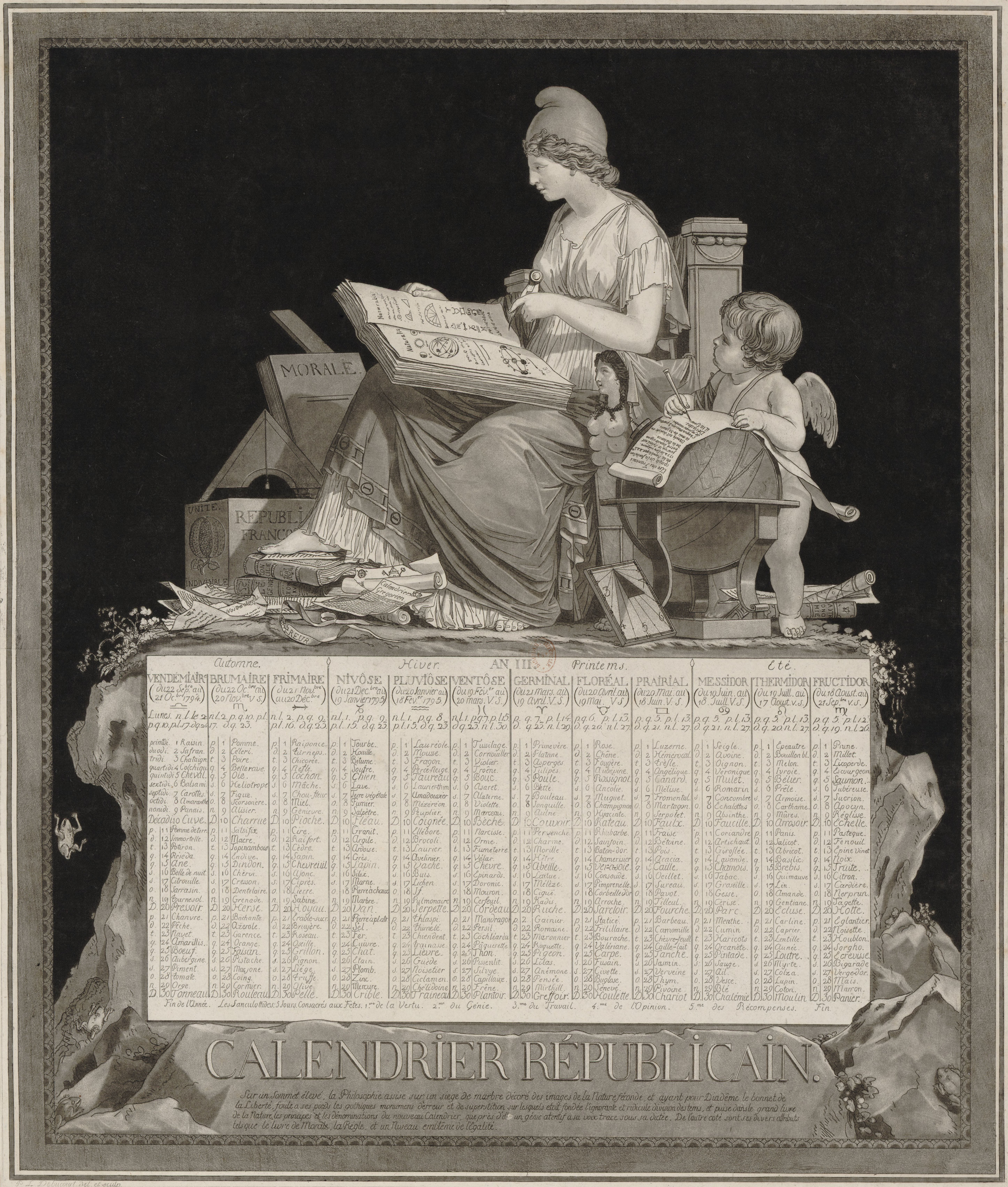

20:52:45
24 h

3
Jours complémentaires
III

Jour de la vertu
Jour du génie
Jour du travail
Jour de l'opinion
Jour des récompenses
Jour de la révolution

décade 37
1	Thursday; 17 September 1795
2	Friday; 18 September 1795
3	Saturday; 19 September 1795
4	Sunday; 20 September 1795
5	Monday; 21 September 1795
6	Tuesday; 22 September 1795

10 h
8:69:96

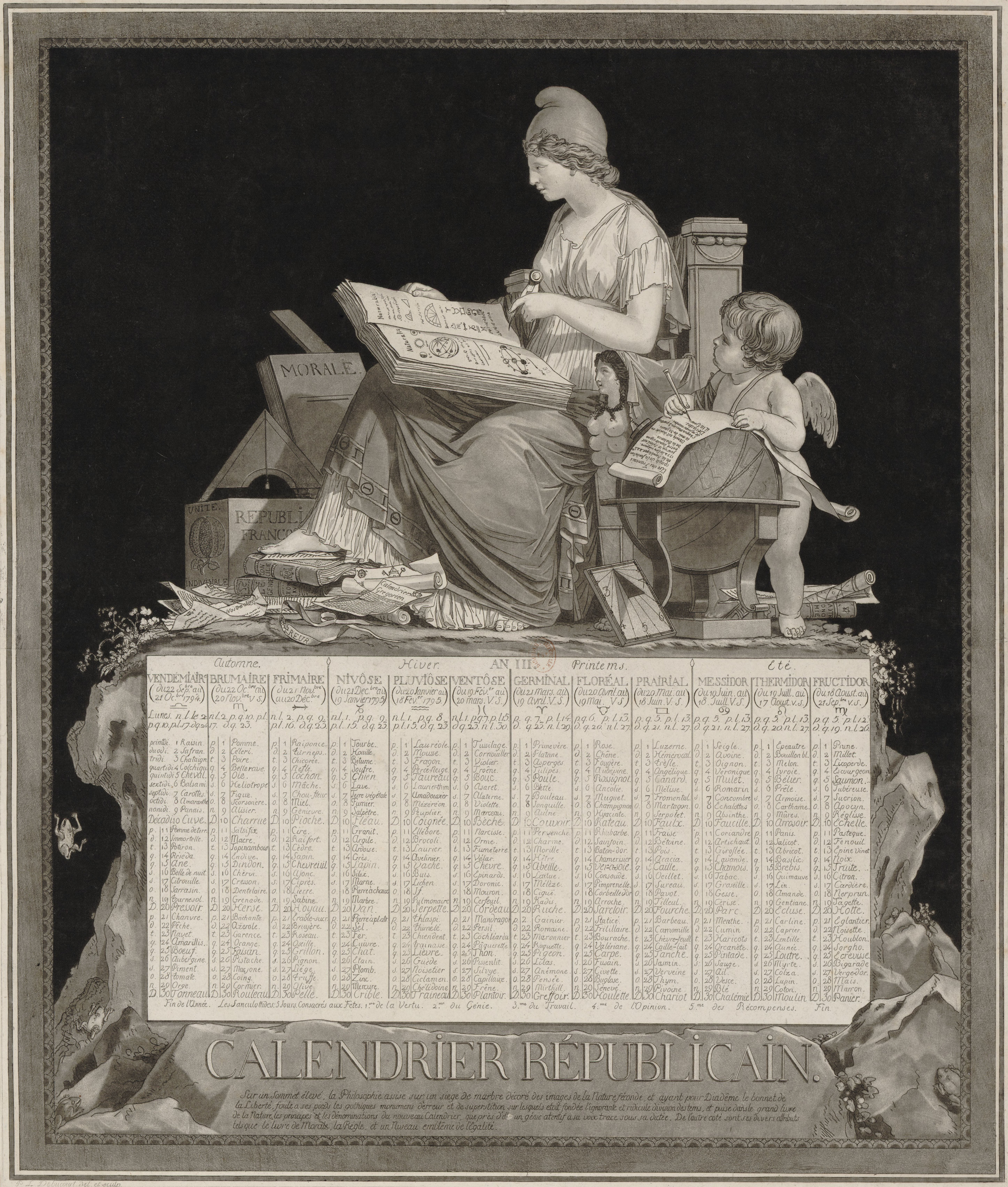

20:52:45
24 h

4
Jours complémentaires
IV

Jour de la vertu
Jour du génie
Jour du travail
Jour de l'opinion
Jour des récompenses

décade 37
1	Saturday; 17 September 1796
2	Sunday; 18 September 1796
3	Monday; 19 September 1796
4	Tuesday; 20 September 1796
5	Wednesday; 21 September 1796

10 h
8:69:96

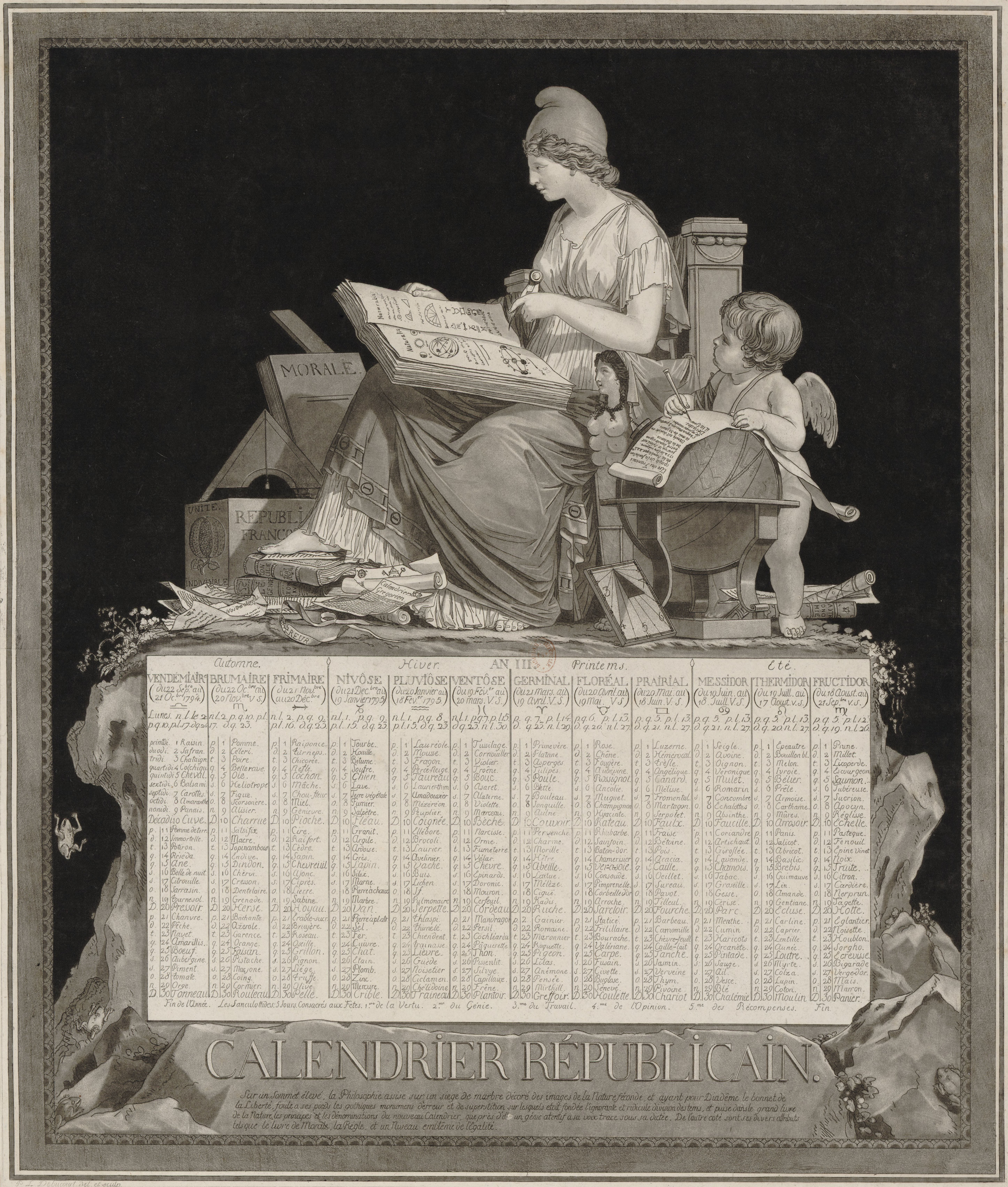

20:52:45
24 h

5
Jours complémentaires
V

Jour de la vertu
Jour du génie
Jour du travail
Jour de l'opinion
Jour des récompenses

décade 37
1	Sunday; 17 September 1797
2	Monday; 18 September 1797
3	Tuesday; 19 September 1797
4	Wednesday; 20 September 1797
5	Thursday; 21 September 1797

10 h
8:69:96

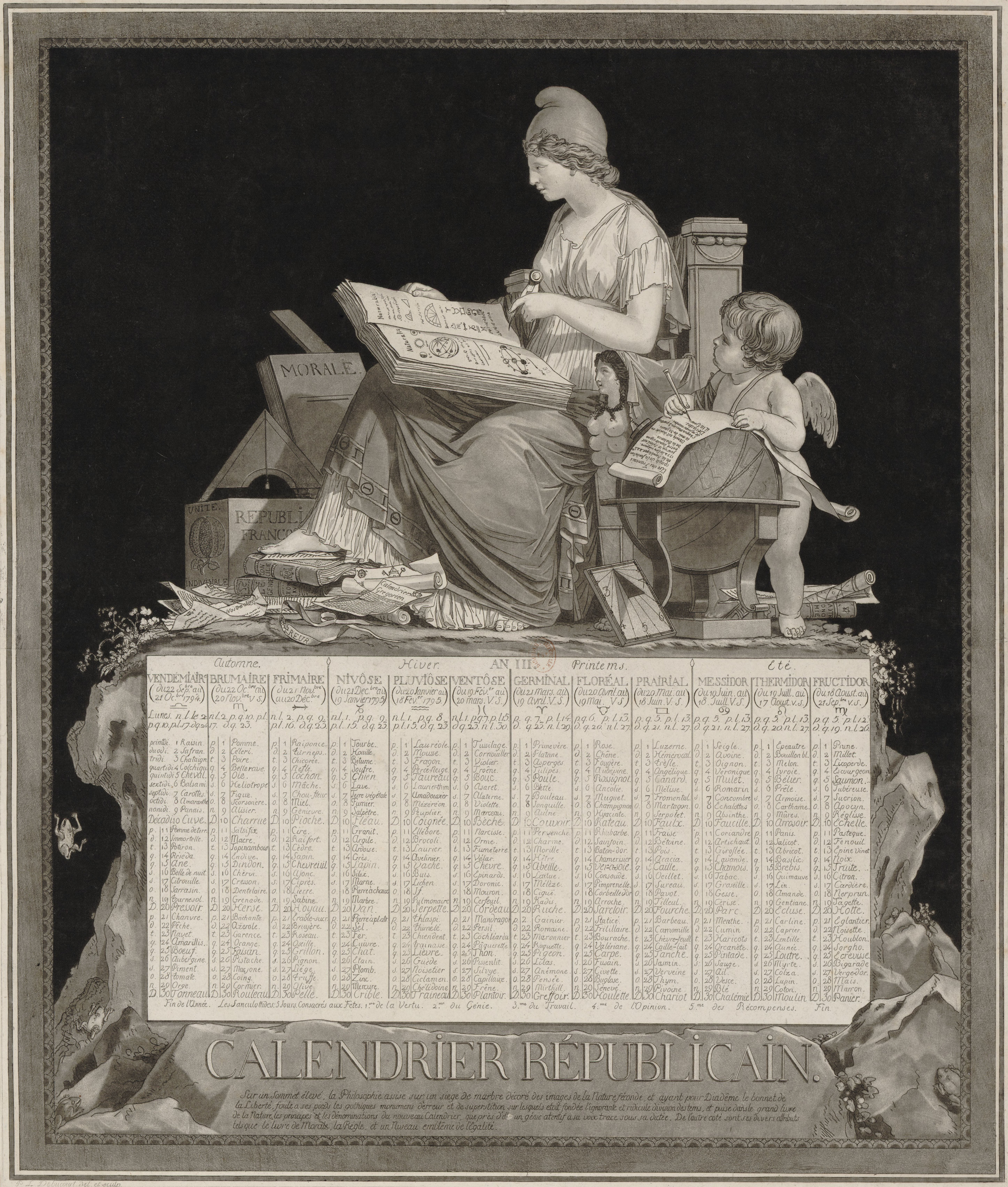

20:52:45
24 h

6
Jours complémentaires
VI

Jour de la vertu
Jour du génie
Jour du travail
Jour de l'opinion
Jour des récompenses

décade 37
1	Monday; 17 September 1798
2	Tuesday; 18 September 1798
3	Wednesday; 19 September 1798
4	Thursday; 20 September 1798
5	Friday; 21 September 1798

10 h
8:69:96

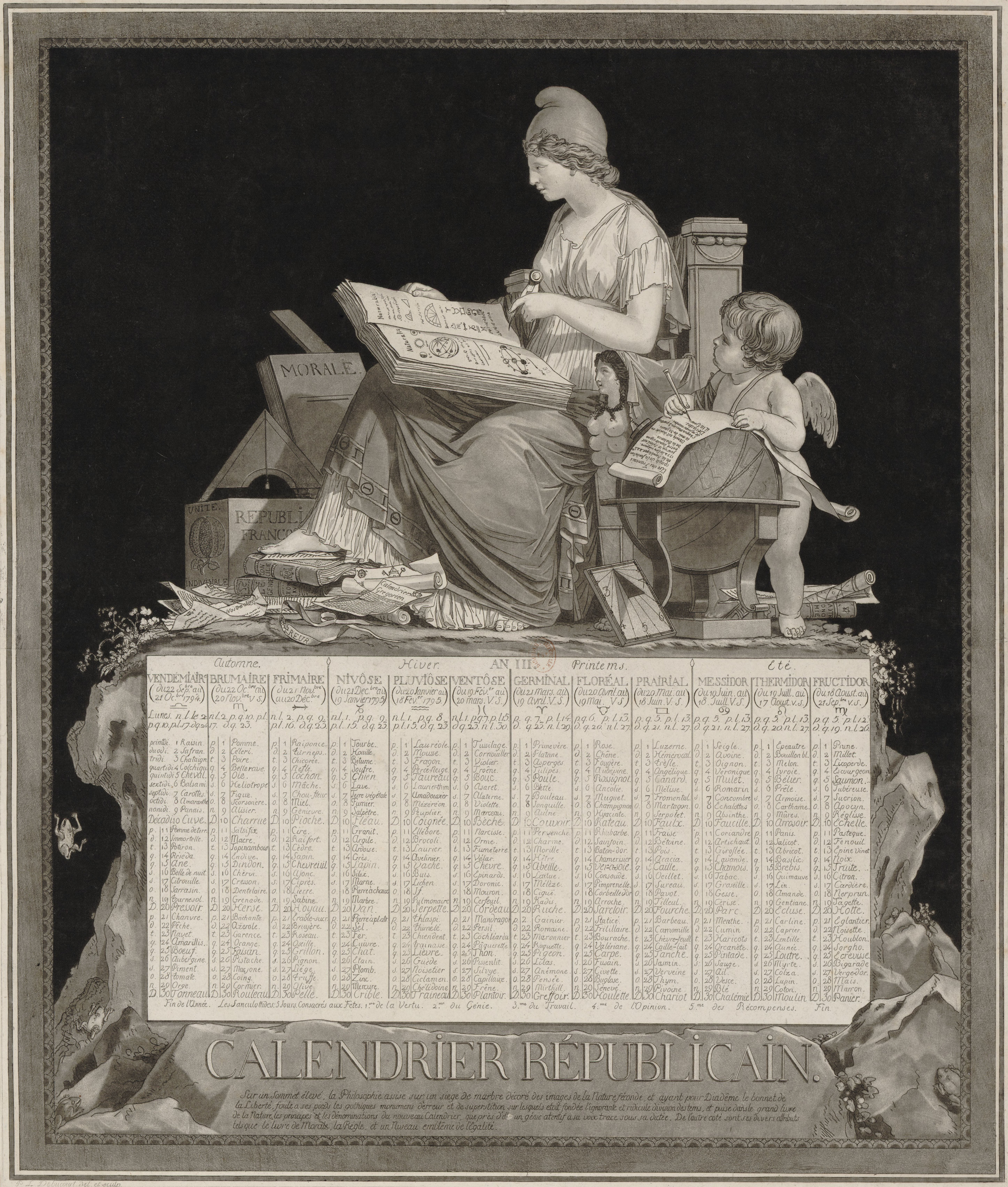

20:52:45
24 h

7
Jours complémentaires
VII

Jour de la vertu
Jour du génie
Jour du travail
Jour de l'opinion
Jour des récompenses
Jour de la révolution

décade 37
1	Tuesday; 17 September 1799
2	Wednesday; 18 September 1799
3	Thursday; 19 September 1799
4	Friday; 20 September 1799
5	Saturday; 21 September 1799
6	Sunday; 22 September 1799

10 h
8:69:96

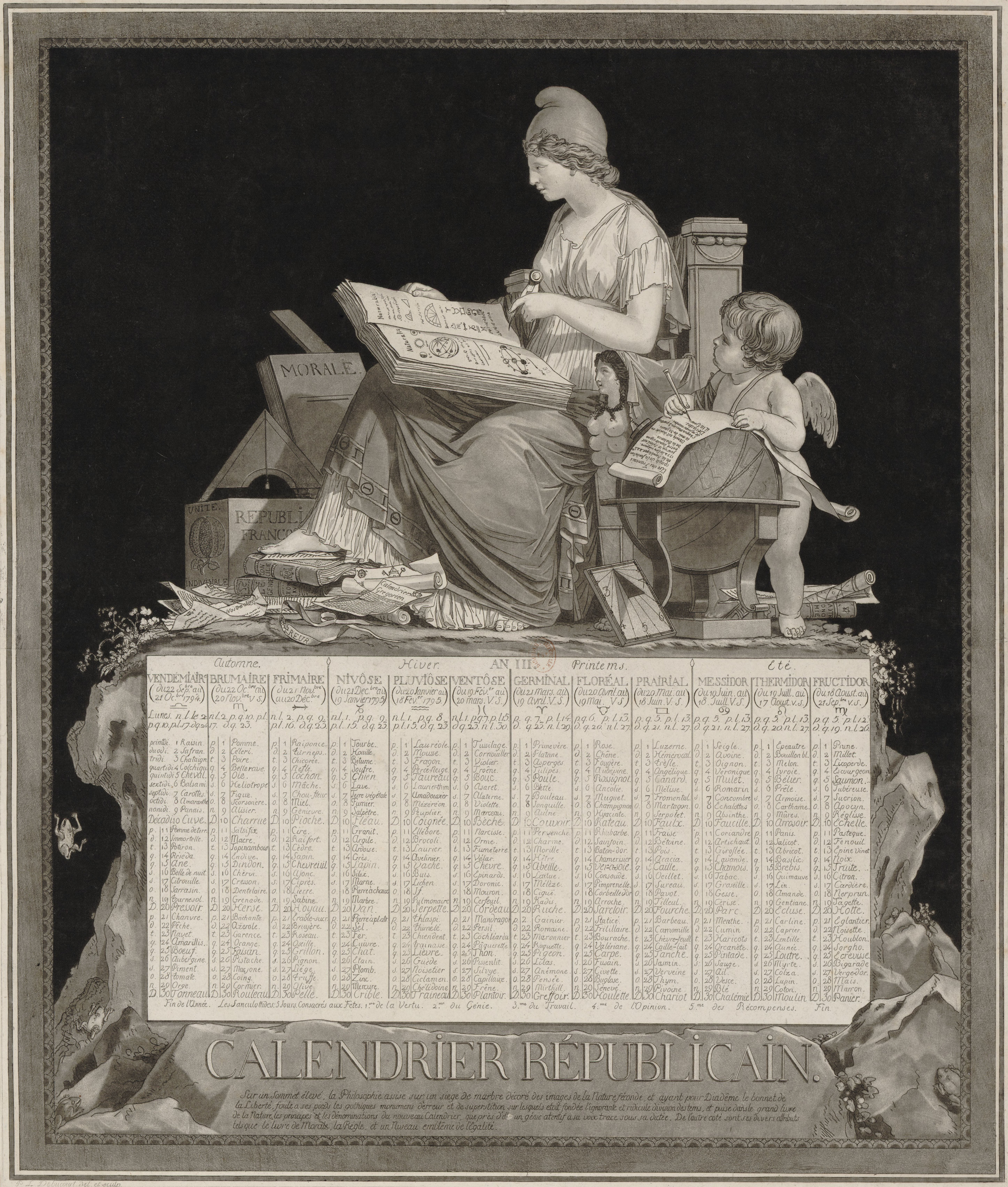

20:52:45
24 h

8
Jours complémentaires
VIII

Jour de la vertu
Jour du génie
Jour du travail
Jour de l'opinion
Jour des récompenses

décade 37
1	Thursday; 18 September 1800
2	Friday; 19 September 1800
3	Saturday; 20 September 1800
4	Sunday; 21 September 1800
5	Monday; 22 September 1800

10 h
8:69:96

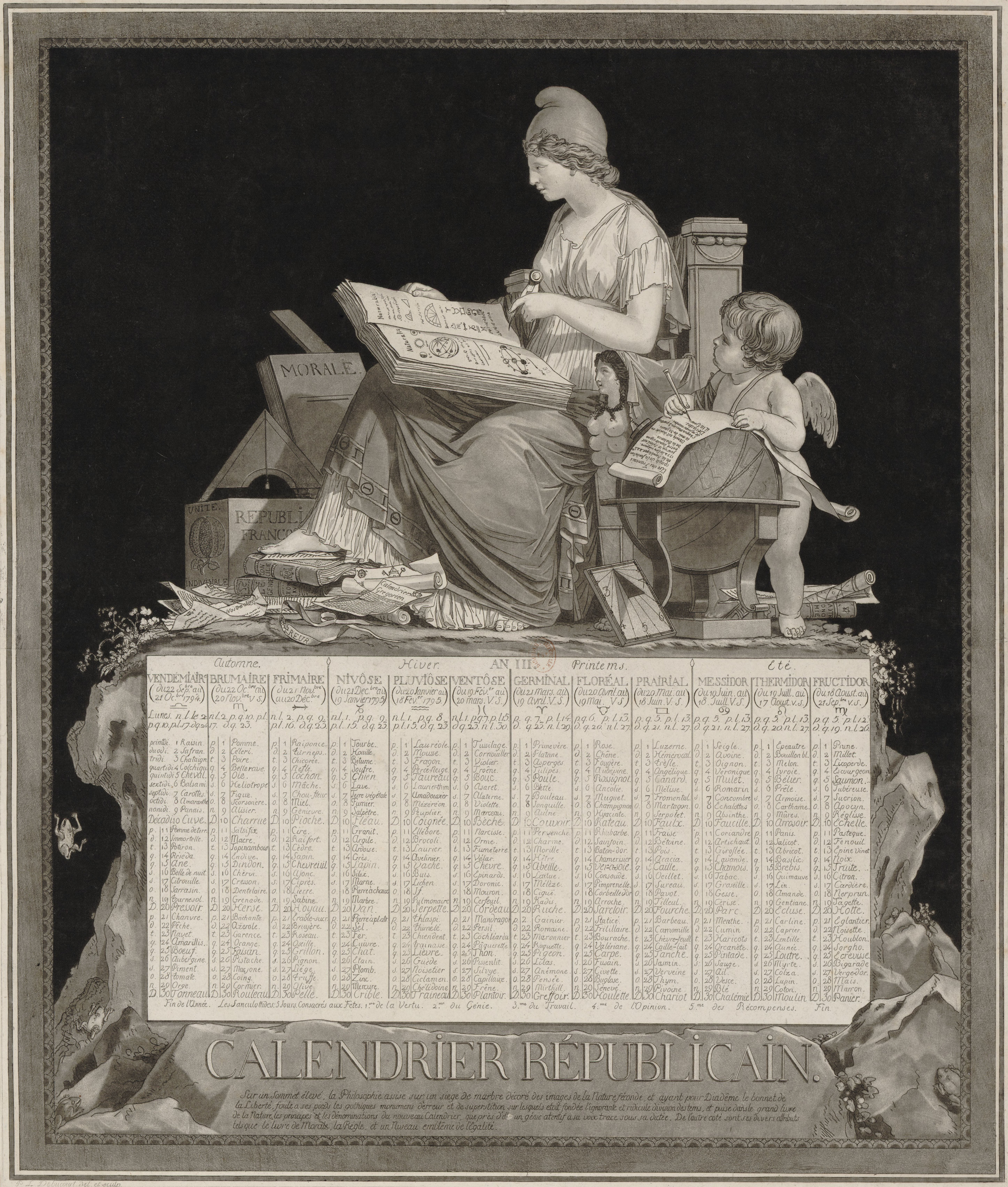

20:52:45
24 h

9
Jours complémentaires
IX

Jour de la vertu
Jour du génie
Jour du travail
Jour de l'opinion
Jour des récompenses

décade 37
1	Friday; 18 September 1801
2	Saturday; 19 September 1801
3	Sunday; 20 September 1801
4	Monday; 21 September 1801
5	Tuesday; 22 September 1801

10 h
8:69:96

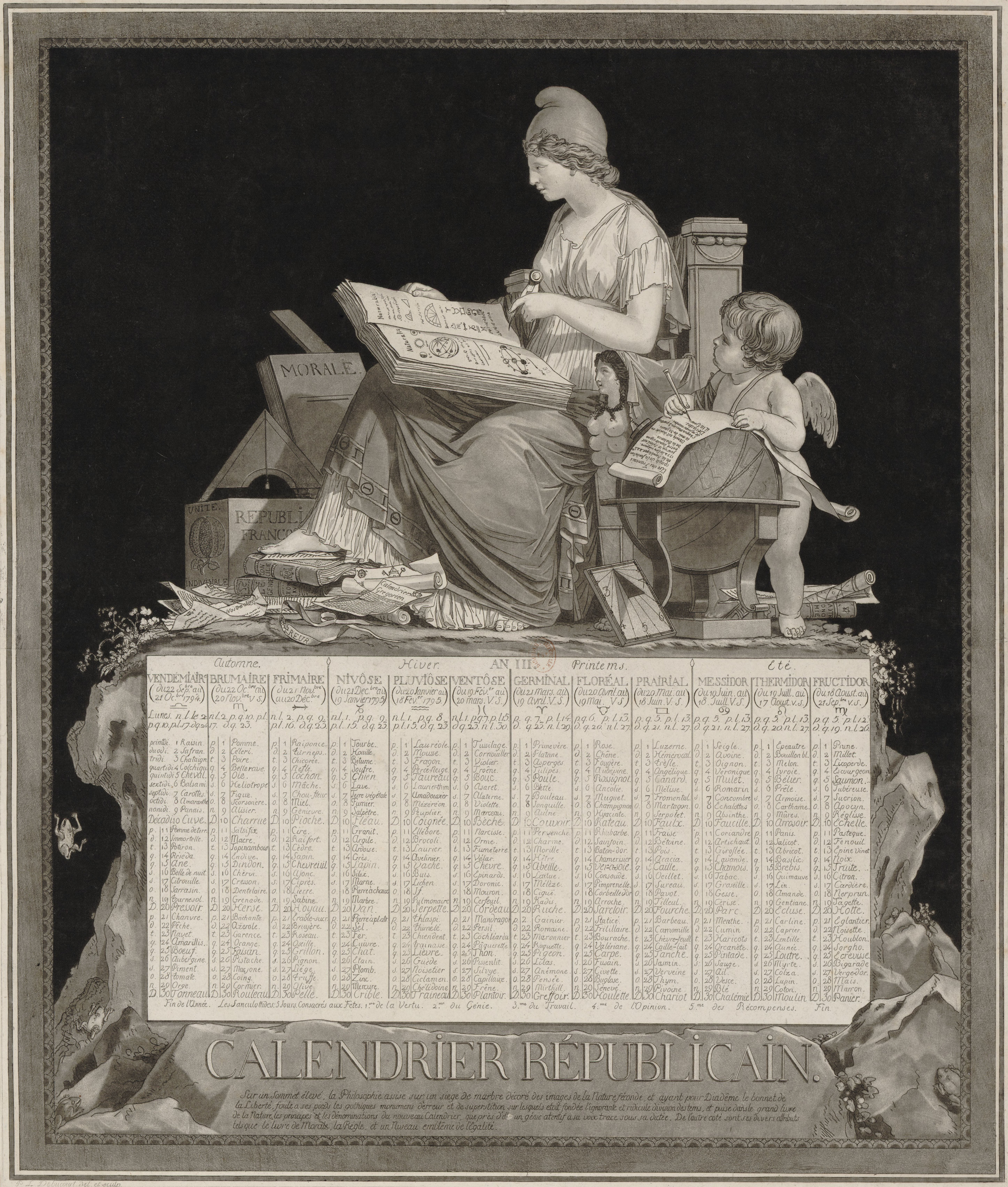

20:52:45
24 h

10
Jours complémentaires
X

Jour de la vertu
Jour du génie
Jour du travail
Jour de l'opinion
Jour des récompenses

décade 37
1	Saturday; 18 September 1802
2	Sunday; 19 September 1802
3	Monday; 20 September 1802
4	Tuesday; 21 September 1802
5	Wednesday; 22 September 1802

10 h
8:69:96

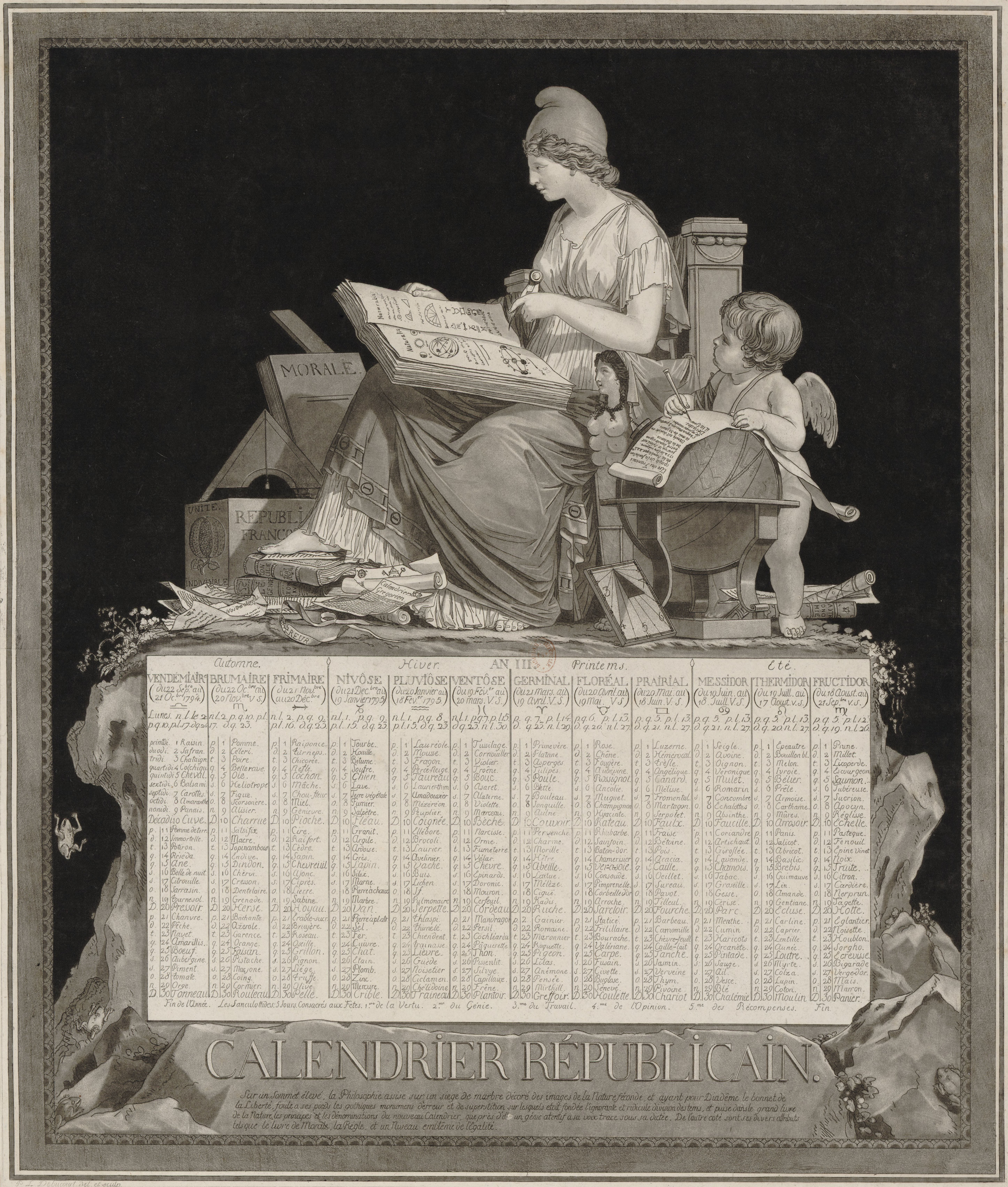

20:52:45
24 h

11
Jours complémentaires
XI

Jour de la vertu
Jour du génie
Jour du travail
Jour de l'opinion
Jour des récompenses
Jour de la révolution

décade 37
1	Sunday; 18 September 1803
2	Monday; 19 September 1803
3	Tuesday; 20 September 1803
4	Wednesday; 21 September 1803
5	Thursday; 22 September 1803
6	Friday; 23 September 1803

10 h
8:69:96

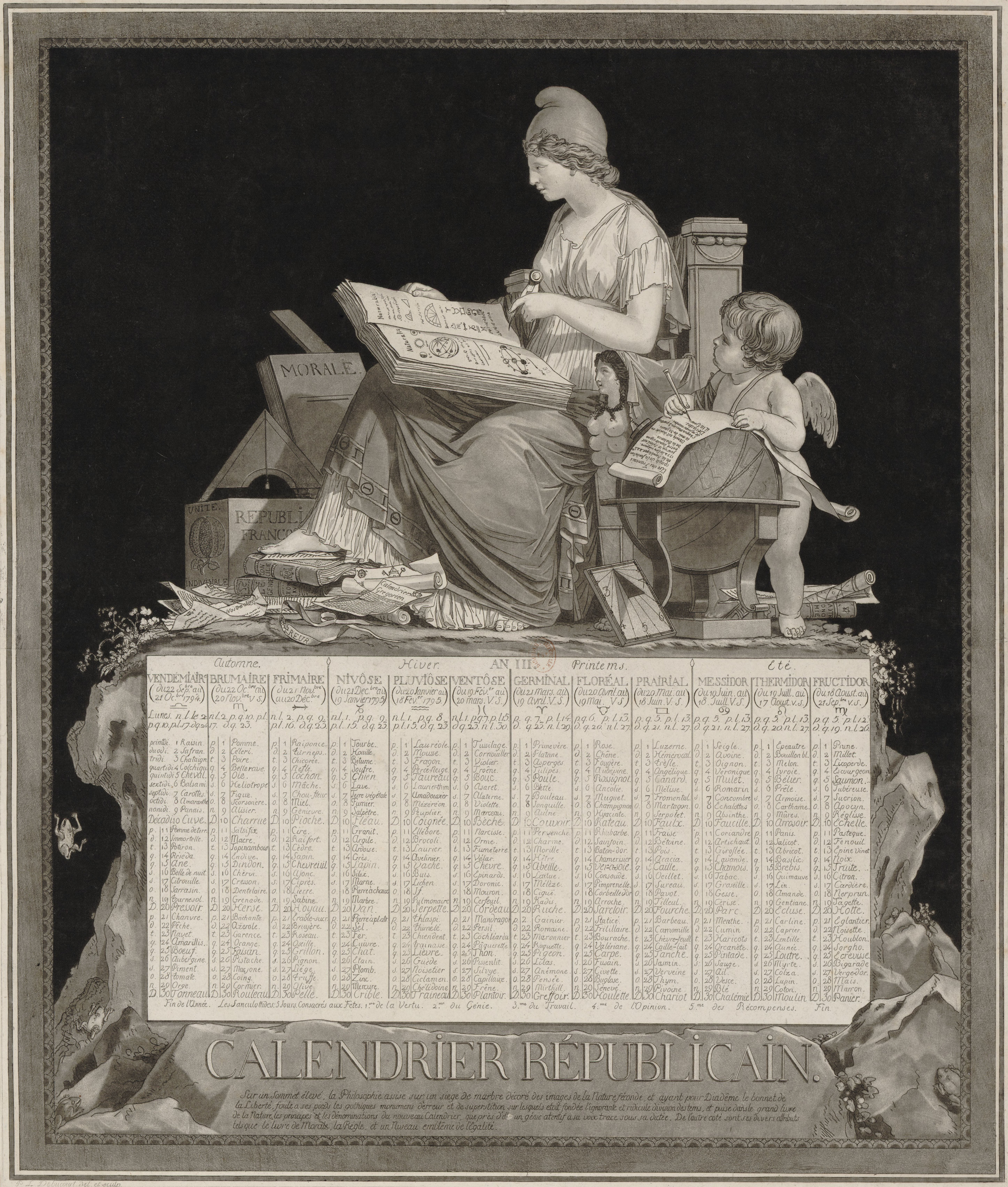

20:52:45
24 h

12
Jours complémentaires
XII

Jour de la vertu
Jour du génie
Jour du travail
Jour de l'opinion
Jour des récompenses

décade 37
1	Tuesday; 18 September 1804
2	Wednesday; 19 September 1804
3	Thursday; 20 September 1804
4	Friday; 21 September 1804
5	Saturday; 22 September 1804

10 h
8:69:96

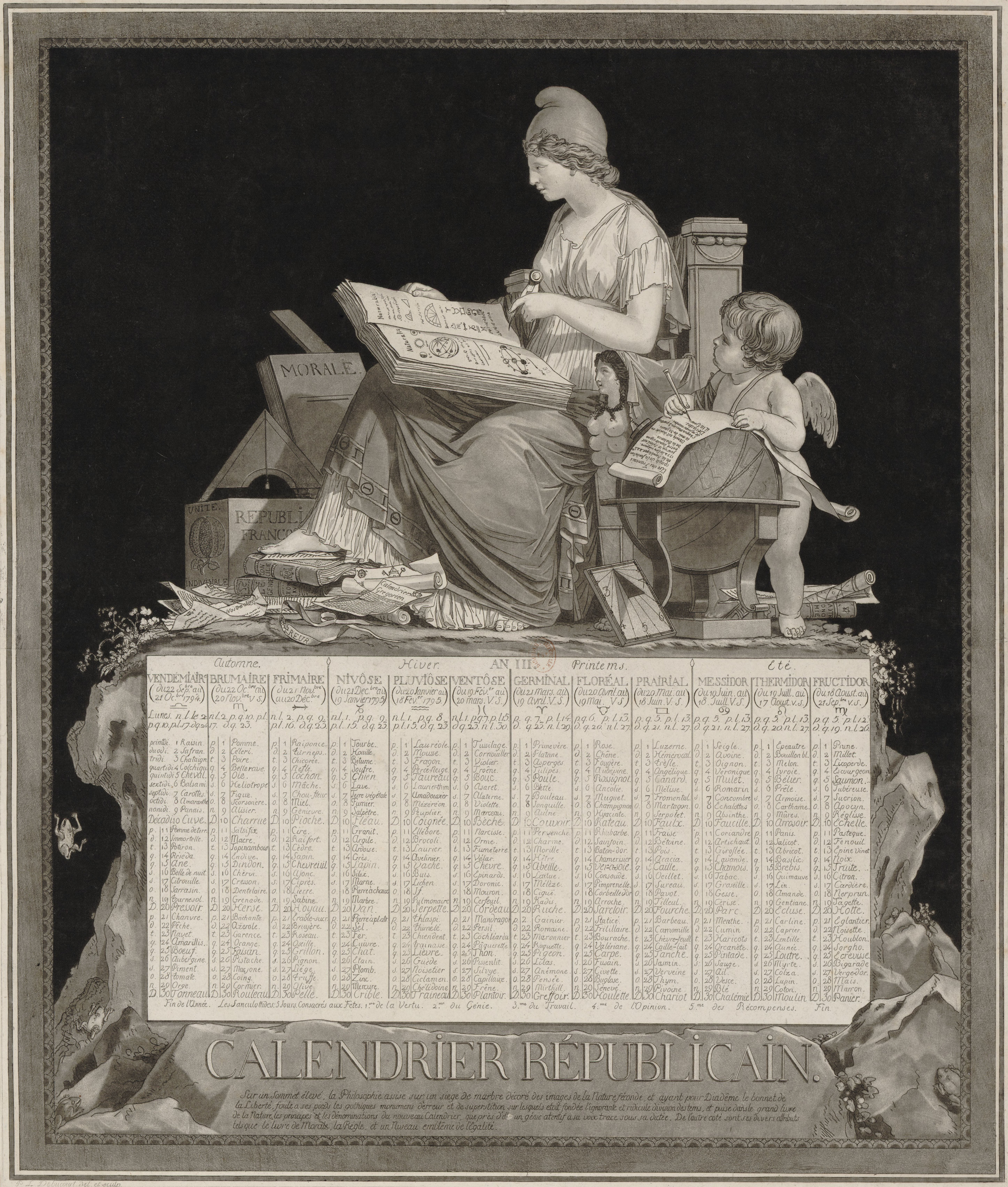

20:52:45
24 h

13
Jours complémentaires
XIII

Jour de la vertu
Jour du génie
Jour du travail
Jour de l'opinion
Jour des récompenses

décade 37
1	Wednesday; 18 September 1805
2	Thursday; 19 September 1805
3	Friday; 20 September 1805
4	Saturday; 21 September 1805
5	Sunday; 22 September 1805

10 h
8:69:96

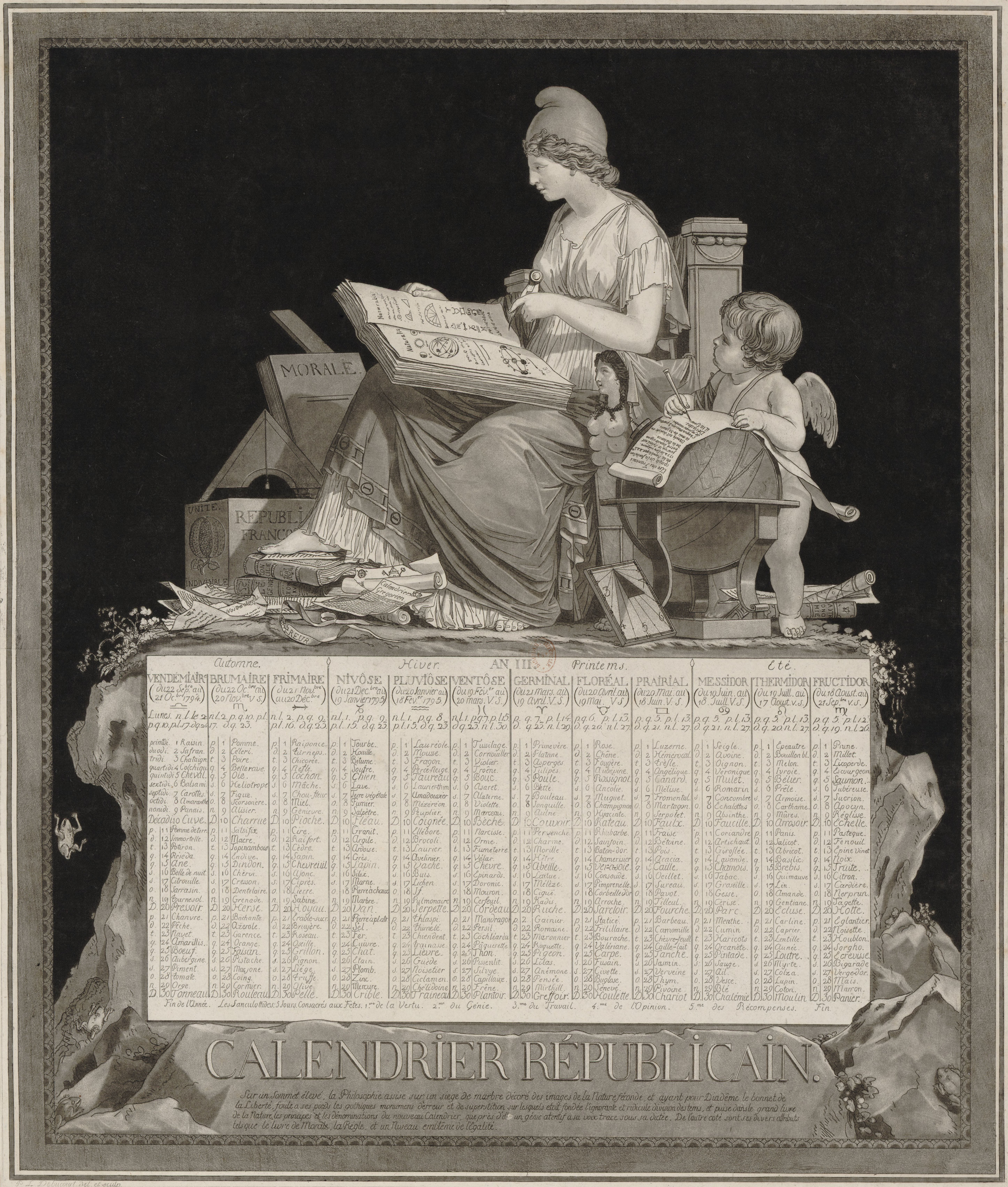

20:52:45
24 h

14
Jours complémentaires
XIV

Jour de la vertu
Jour du génie
Jour du travail
Jour de l'opinion
Jour des récompenses

décade 37
1	Thursday; 18 September 1806
2	Friday; 19 September 1806
3	Saturday; 20 September 1806
4	Sunday; 21 September 1806
5	Monday; 22 September 1806

10 h
8:69:96

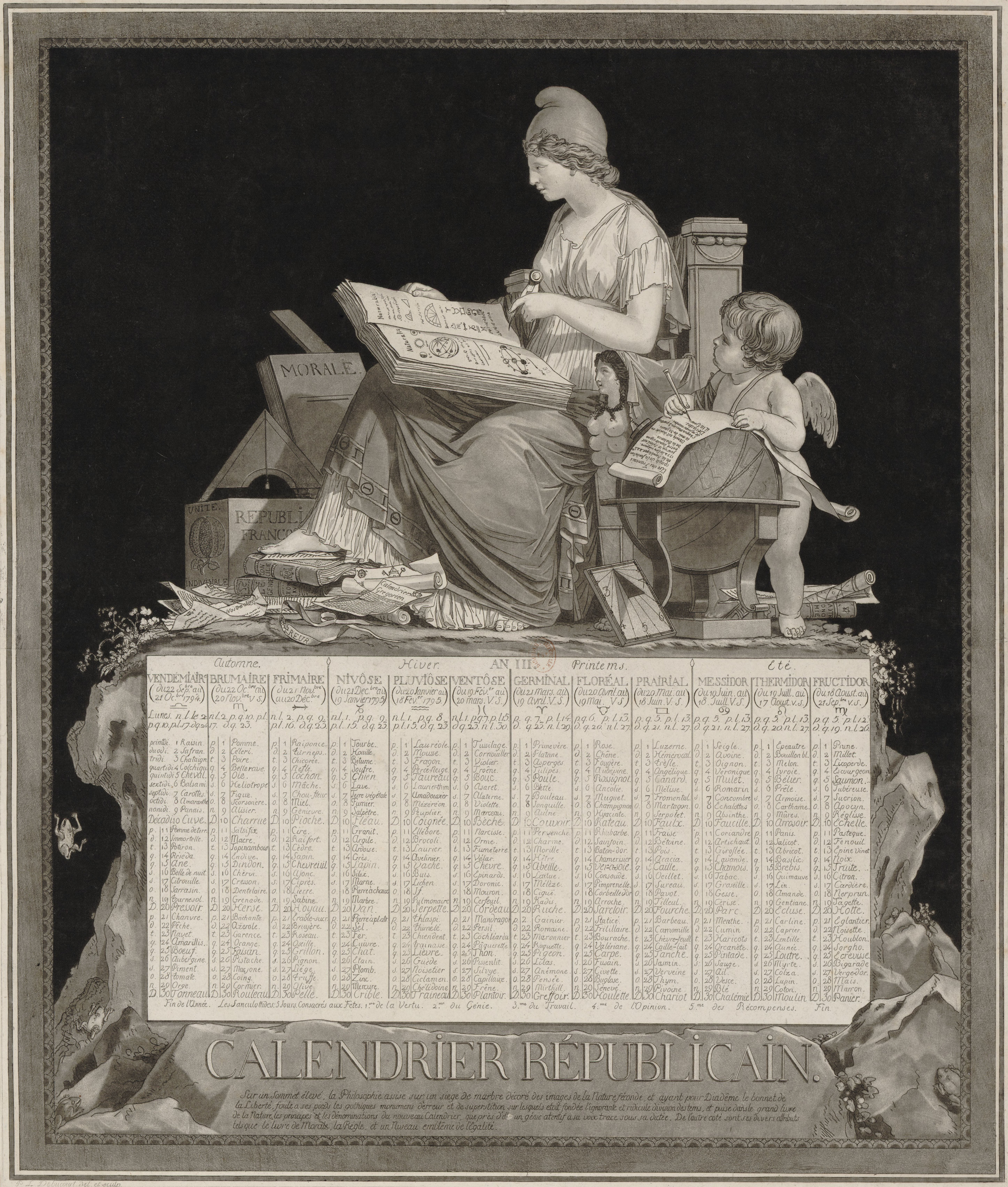

20:52:45
24 h

== History ==
In the decree of 5 October 1793 (le 14 du 1er mois de l'an II; later: le 14 Vendémiaire de l'an II) by the National Convention, the days following the last month of the year were named jours complémentaires and numbered serially. Only the leap day (jour intercalaire) received a name:

1. premier jour complémentaire — First Complementary Day
2. second jour complémentaire — Second Complementary Day
3. troisième jour complémentaire — Third Complementary Day
4. quatrième jour complémentaire — Fourth Complementary Day
5. cinquième jour complémentaire — Fifth Complementary Day
6. jour de la Révolution — Revolution Day

The other days, decades, and months were also serially numbered.

On 24 October (le 3 du 2e mois; later: le 3 Brumaire) of the same year, the poet Philippe-François-Nazaire Fabre, known as Fabre d'Églantine, made public his dislike of this naming convention ("le premier jour de la première décade du premier mois de la première année"). He suggested proper names for the months, the days of the months, and the days of the decades. For the jours complémentaires, he introduced the name Sansculottides. The individual days should have the following names:

1. fête du génie — Celebration of Talent
2. fête du travail — Celebration of Labour
3. fête des actions — Celebration of Policy
4. fête des récompenses — Celebration of Honors
5. fête de l’opinion — Celebration of Convictions
6. la Sans-culottide / la Sanculottide — (rough meaning:) "Recognition of the Uprising" or "Festival of the Masses" (in modern American parlance:) Festival of the 99%

According to the proposal by Fabre d'Églantine:

The fête du génie should be dedicated to the most precious and, for the nation, most useful achievements of the human mind accomplished in the past year.

The fête du travail should be focused on industry, physical labour, and production of useful things.

On the fête des actions, good and beneficial policies should be praised that have been helpful, even if only of benefit to individuals rather than to the nation.

On the fête des récompenses, people should be rewarded for the merits exemplifying the previous three days' mottos.

On the fête de l’opinion, people should criticise the administration, without fear of punishment, in the form of songs, caricatures, and ironic and sarcastic speeches. By this, d'Églantine meant: "I dare to say that this one day will cause public servants to do their duty more than even the laws of a Draco ever could."

The Sanculottide, celebrated in leap years, should be the celebration of national unity. Representatives from all parts of the country should meet each other in the capital and celebrate together.

On 24 November 1793 these proposals were accepted with slight modifications. It was decided that the name should be written fêtes Sansculotides (one 't'). The alternate spellings Sans-culotides and Sans-culottides were also used. The fête des actions was shifted to the first place and named fête de la vertu. The fête des récompenses went to the last place and the leap year day regained its old name:

1. fête de la vertu — Celebration of Virtue
2. fête du génie — Celebration of Talent
3. fête du travail — Celebration of Labour
4. fête de l’opinion — Celebration of Convictions
5. fête des récompenses — Celebration of Honors
6. fête de la Révolution — Celebration of the Revolution

On 24 August 1795 (le 7 Fructidor de l'an III), the Sansculottides were renamed again to jours complémentaires (Complementary Days). The fête du travail was also known as the fête du labour. The fête de l'opinion was also termed fête de l'option (Celebration of Choice) or fête de la raison (Celebration of Reason).

The Basque translation of the calendar for 1799 simply names the bethagail-egunak as bethagail-legun, bethagail-bigun,... ("complementary primidi", "complementary duodi",...).

== Conversion table ==
Table for conversion between Republican and Gregorian Calendar
referring to the "Sansculottides"

Common Years

I. / II. / IV. / V. / VI.
Fête de la vertu	Fête du génie	Fête du travail	Fête de l'opinion	Fête des recompenses
17	18	19	20	21
September / 1793 / 1794 / 1796 / 1797 / 1798

VIII. / IX. / X. / XII. / XIII.
Fête de la vertu	Fête du génie	Fête du travail	Fête de l'opinion	Fête des recompenses
18	19	20	21	22
September / 1800 / 1801 / 1802 / 1804 / 1805

Leap Years

III. / VII.
Fête de la vertu	Fête du génie	Fête du travail	Fête de l'opinion	Fête des recompenses	Fête de la révolution
17	18	19	20	21	22
September / 1795 / 1799

XI.
Fête de la vertu	Fête du génie	Fête du travail	Fête de l'opinion	Fête des recompenses	Fête de la révolution
18	19	20	21	22	23
September / 1803
