= Al Khadra, Libya =

Al Khadra الخضرا
- Village
- Location in Libya
- Coordinates: 32°33′N 21°47′E
- Country: Libya
- Region: Cyrenaica
- District: Jabal al Akhdar
- Time zone: UTC + 2

Al Khadra (Arabic: الخضرا ALA-LC: al-Khaḍrā) is a village in the District of Jabal al Akhdar in north-eastern Libya. It is located 35 km south of Bayda.
