= Revolution Day =

Public holidays of commemoration

Revolution Day or the Day of the Revolution refers to public holidays or remembrance days in various countries held in commemoration of an important event in the country's history, usually the starting point or a turning point in a revolution that led to significant political change.

- Burkina Faso, January 3 (1966). It relates to the anniversary of the 1966 Upper Voltan coup d'état. See Public holidays in Burkina Faso.
- Zanzibar, January 12 (1964). See Zanzibar Revolution.
- Egypt, January 25 (2011). Also known as January's Revolution Day. Marks the day of the beginning of the 2011 Egyptian revolution. See Public holidays in Egypt.
- Venezuela, February 2 (1999). Marks the day of the start of the Bolivarian Revolution. See Public holidays in Venezuela.
- Iran, February 11 (1979). Marks the day when the Shah of Iran was overthrown by a coalition of conservative Shia clerics, leftist political parties, and students. The anniversary of the 1979 Iranian revolution is celebrated every year.
- Libya, February 17 (2011). Marks the day when an armed revolution started against the Libyan government in aims of toppling it, sparking the first civil war. See Public holidays in Libya.
- Greece, March 25 (1821). Marks the day when the Greek Revolution was declared. See Greek Independence Day.
- United States, July 4 (1776). Also known as Independence Day. Marks the day that the United States Declaration of Independence was ratified during the American Revolutionary War.
- Nicaragua, July 19 (1979). Also known as Liberation Day. Marks the day that the FSLN Army defeated the Somoza dictatorships in the Nicaraguan Revolution.
- The Gambia, July 22 (1994). See Public holidays in the Gambia.
- Egypt, July 23 (1952). See Revolution Day (Egypt).
- Vietnam, August 19 (1945). See August Revolution.
- Eritrea, September 1 (1961). In commemoration of the Battle of Adal which started the Eritrean War of Independence.
- Libyan Arab Jamahiriya, September 1 (1969). In commemoration of the Green Revolution of Muammar Gaddafi. See Libyan coup d'état of 1969.
- Mozambique, September 25 (1964). See Public holidays in Mozambique.
- North Macedonia, October 11 (1941). Marks the beginning of the National Liberation War of Macedonia. See Public holidays in North Macedonia.
- Guatemala, October 20 (1944). One of two Patriotic Days, commemorates a coup d'état led by Francisco Javier Arana and Jacobo Arbenz Guzmán.
- Algeria, November 1 (1954). It relates to the Toussaint Rouge events that occurred on that day across French Algeria and is taken as the starting date for the Algerian War which lasted until 1962 and led to Algerian independence from France. See Public holidays in Algeria.
- Bangladesh, November 7 (1975). See National Revolution and Solidarity Day.
- Soviet Union, November 7 (1917). In commemoration of the October Revolution. See Public holidays in the Soviet Union.
- Mexico, November 20 (1910). See Revolution Day (Mexico).
- Tunisia, December 17 (2010). Marks the day of the beginning of the Tunisian Revolution. See Public holidays in Tunisia.
- Sudan, December 19 (2018). Marks the day of the start of mass protests in the Sudanese Revolution, ending with the 2019 Sudanese coup d'état. See Public holidays in Sudan.

The leap day in the French Republican Calendar, in use for several years after the French Revolution, added after a franciade, is also known as "Revolution Day" (Jour de la Révolution or Fête de la Révolution in French). See Sansculottides for details.

== See also ==
- Public holiday
- National Day
- Republic Day
- Independence Day
- Freedom Day
- Liberation Day
