= Sarir field =

Oilfield in Libya

Sarir Field
- Location of the El Sharara oil field within Libya
- Country: Libya
- Location/block: Sirte Basin, Concession 65
- Offshore/onshore: Onshore
- Coordinates: 28.22°N 19.13°E
- Operator: Arabian Gulf Oil Company
- Partner: National Oil Corporation

Field history
- Discovery: 1961
- Start of production: 1961
- Peak of production: NA
- Abandonment: NA

Production
- Estimated oil in place: 2,922 Mbbl (464,600,000 m^{3}) (Sarir C): 1,200 Mbbl (190,000,000 m^{3}) (Sarir L)
- Estimated gas in place: 0.6×10^{12} cu ft (17 km^{3}) (Sarir C)
- Producing formations: Cretaceous, Pre-Upper Cretaceous Fluvial Sandstones

The Sarir Field was discovered in southern Cyrenaica during 1961 and is considered to be the largest oil field in Libya, with estimated oil reserves of 12 Gbbl (1.9 km^{3}). Sarir is operated by the Arabian Gulf Oil Company (AGOCO), a subsidiary of the state-owned National Oil Corporation (NOC).

== Location ==
The Sarir field or, more specifically, Sarir C is on west edge of the Calanscio Sand Sea at the southeast margin of the Sirte Basin. Sarir C, which is part of a three-field complex, is 56 km long and 40 km wide covering 378 km^{2}. To its north is Sarir L, covering 15 sq mi (39 km^{2}). Situated between the two is a much smaller Sarir North pool. Estimated ultimate oil recovery from Sarir L is 1.2 Gbbl (190,000,000 m^{3}).

== Pre-Discovery ==
In 1957, the Libyan government granted Concession 65 to Bunker Hunt, an independent oil producer from Texas. By 1960, BP had assumed a 50% interest in C-65 and became the operator. After large discoveries in the Sirte Basin in 1958 and 1959, a reflection seismology survey was conducted on C-65, followed by an aeromagnetic survey showing the existence of large structures. Later that year, BP began drilling in C-65, 80, and 81, targeting Paleocene and Cretaceous carbonates that had yielded discoveries in the Nasser (Zelten), Defa, Raguba field, and Bahi fields. Mobil discovered Cretaceous basal sand at Amal in 1959, but early results did not recognize its full potential.

Before drilling the C-1-65 well, BP drilled six tests to basement in C-65, 80, and 81. None had high hydrocarbon shows. Eocene, Paleocene, and Cretaceous carbonates were generally freshwater bearing, and basement highs were draped in Late Cretaceous shales. There were occasional redbed vestiges at the shale-basement contact and bitumen veining. Many wells proved expensive due to lost circulation in Paleocene-Cretaceous carbonates and caving in underlying Late Cretaceous shales. This was so severe that the Sarir field was nearly bypassed because oil was not anticipated in the Nubian Formation. However BP's chief geologist insisted a basement core be taken in every well. This turned out to be a good decision, since C-1-65 was subsequently shown to be a prolific reservoir with initial production rates of 20,000 bbl/d (3,200 m^{3}/d).

== Discovery ==
For years BP avoided using gas detectors on its oil platforms, citing numerous false alarms. However, in 1961, Baroid was hired to set up gas detectors on BP's Libyan wells. C-1-65 gave high readings. This was assumed to be a false alarm, but high readings persisted. Examinations of shale caving samples revealed oil-stained sand grains at the bottom of the plates. 61 m of petroleum play was drilled. The top play in Lower Cretaceous sandstones occurred at 2631 m. On drill-stem tests C-1-65 produced at a rate of 3,900 bbl/d (620 m^{3}/d).

== Post-Discovery ==
C-1-65 had an oil column exceeding 76 m, above predicted closure for its shallow reflection structure. Although seismic maps gave structural indications, details were unreliable at the reservoirs top 1676 m below. Thus, while the second and third wells were drilled, a seismic refraction survey was shot. It gave control over the basement structure, but since the first four wells proved reservoir sands varied from 141-410m in thickness over a relatively short distance, the survey gave little control over the trapping structure. Seismic maps on both horizons and subsurface information showed the reservoir structure and helped limit drilling in dry holes.

After discovery continuous drilling occurred with up to five rigs at a time. Initially, short outsteps up to 4 km were made, followed by bolder drilling to confirm reserves and justify costs for a 516 km oil pipeline to Tobruk. Once confirmed, C-1-65 was steadily drilled on a 2 km grid spacing. At this time, two smaller fields were discovered: Sarir North and L-65.

In May 1965 five infill wells were sabotaged. The incident occurred during the reign of King Idris before the 1969 coup led by Colonel Qaddafi. The wild wells were not reported in the news media and the perpetrations not revealed. Until the Persian Gulf War of 1991 this was the largest simultaneous well fire ever. In recognition of the number and ferocity of the blowouts BP called for the fire fighter Red Adair plus his lieutenants Boots & Coots. On arrival the crew drove around the field to assess the task. One of the wells had not caught fire but was erupting crude. Living up to his larger than life reputation mirrored by John Wayne in the film Hellfighters Adair approached the well and closed the undamaged master valve saying (reputedly) "one down four to go". On return to the main camp he informed BP that he could cap the wells unaided and dispatched Boots & Coots back to Houston. He extinguished the fires in 3 weeks.

Initial production from the main Sarir oil wells averaged 8,000 bbl/d (1,300 m^{3}/d), with some achieving rates of 20,000 bbl/d (3,200 m^{3}/d). Since Sarir does not have a gas cap and GORs vary between 60-225 static ft³ per barrel, pressure maintenance was an issue. Fresh water was used, available from about 46 m to 518 m. Some areas used downhole pumps to maintain production. Desalters were also added, since the large salt amounts entrained in crude production were untolerable by many refineries.

| Statistic | Amount |
|---|---|
| Crude gravity | 37° API |
| Wax content | 19% |
| Sulfur content | < 0.25% |
| Reserves | 12 Gbbl (1.9 km^{3}) |
| Ultimate recoverable reserves | 6.5 Gbbl (1.03×10^{9} m^{3}) |
| Cummulate production | 1.5 Gbbl (240,000,000 m^{3}) (1983 est.) |

Notes:
1. Crude oil Amounts in billions of barrels.

== Discovery Method ==
Sarir was discovered by geophysical methods and subsurface geology with no topographic or geomorphic anomalies being reported. An air magnetometer revealed the southwestern A structure and its southeastern prolongation, which was later found to be a buried fault line. Sarir is located on the northwest plunge of a gravity maximum axis and overshadowed by two western features: (1) a large gravity maximum, the A structure; (2) a strong gravity maximum, the B structure. The eastern feature, rising to a gravity maximum, is known as the C structure (Sarir C).

Seismic reflection and refraction surveys (1960-1961) revealed that the C structure has a pronounced basement feature. An Eocene seismic reflection horizon was mapped, showing a few hundred feet of relief over the entire complex, compared to a refraction map showing up to 610 m. After drilling the first two wells in C-65 (A and B structures), an Eocene map showed the C structure as having 300 ft (91 m) of closure. This was considered sufficient justification to proceed with drilling.

== Structure ==
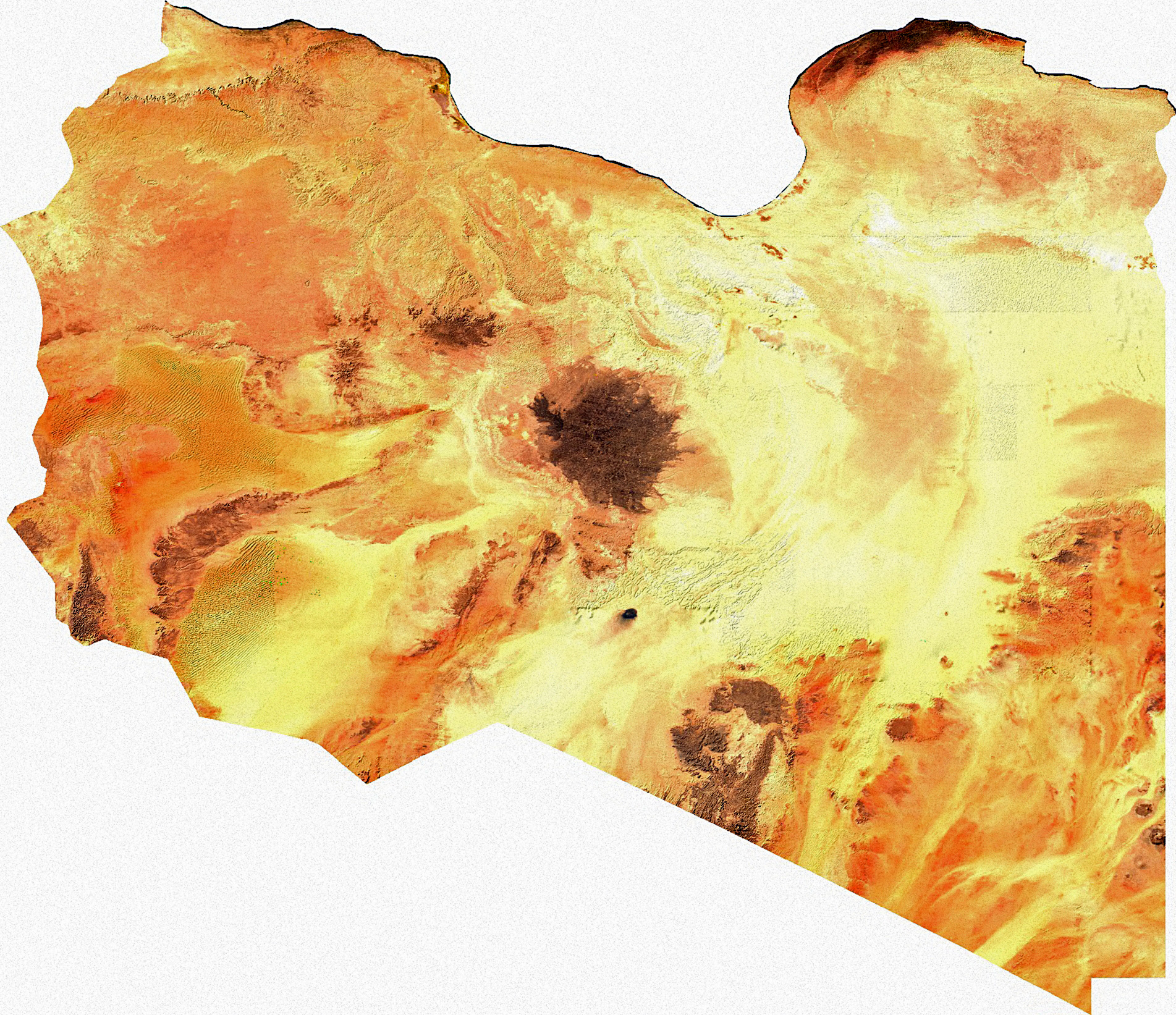
Satellite image of Libya, generated from raster graphics data supplied by The Map Library

The Sirte Basin province ranks 13th among the world’s petroleum provinces, having known reserves of 43.1 billion barrels (6.85×10^{9} m^{3}) of oil equivalent (36.7 billion barrels (5.83×10^{9} m^{3})) of oil, 37.7 trillion cubic feet (1,070 km^{3}) of gas, 100 million barrels (16,000,000 m^{3}) of natural gas liquids. It includes an area about the size of the Williston Basin of the northern United States and southern Canada (≈490,000 km^{2}). Late Mesozoic and Tertiary features developed on a Precambrian basement and eroded Paleozoic surface. The main northwest-to-southeast synclinal trough experienced repeated subsidence during fault adjustments. Several regional horst and graben trends originating in the Late Cretaceous remained active during the Tertiary as the Basin continued subsiding. The faults predominant trend is northwest-to-southeast, other northeast-to-southwest trends may form part of a conjugate pattern controlled by the gross texture basement.

In Pre-Cretaceous times, areas that became Sarir accumulations were occupied by topographic highs. It is probable that, even at this time, they were controlled by sets of conjugate faults trending northwest-to-southeast and northeast-to-southwest. The southern C structure may have been connected to a larger hinterland where Cretaceous sediments were derived and subsequently subsided.

Major fault movement occurred during Cretaceous sand deposition, most evident on north and west flanks of the C structure subject to uplift and erosion. This is expressed by a disconformity that removed successively deeper reservoir beds to the north and west. Major downwarping to the south probably began near the end of the Cretaceous period, isolating the C structure from its hinterland, forming it into a trap, and providing a deep shale trough that may have been a major hydrocarbon generating areas.

There was little fault movement during the Tertiary, but differential compaction created a simple anticline draped over the underlying Cretaceous structure. At basement level, Sarir C is less pronounced than structures to the south and northwest, which have poor sand development, in that Late Cretaceous shales rest on basement without the intervening sandstone reservoir of the Sarir field.

The fall from the Sarir C crest to the southern low is 1000 m, occurring over a 22 km distance equivalent to an overall dip of 2.5°. The steepest dip recorded is 4.5°. The triangular-shaped crest has an east-west base roughly 40 km long and a north-south perpendicular of 20 km. Vertical closure is 122 m. Sarir North and L-65 are on a northwest extension of the northeast side of the C structure. L-65, has a triangular shape with a southwest-trending flank. Structural evolution was marked by vertical tectonic movement with little evidence of horizontal stresses.

== Stratigraphy ==
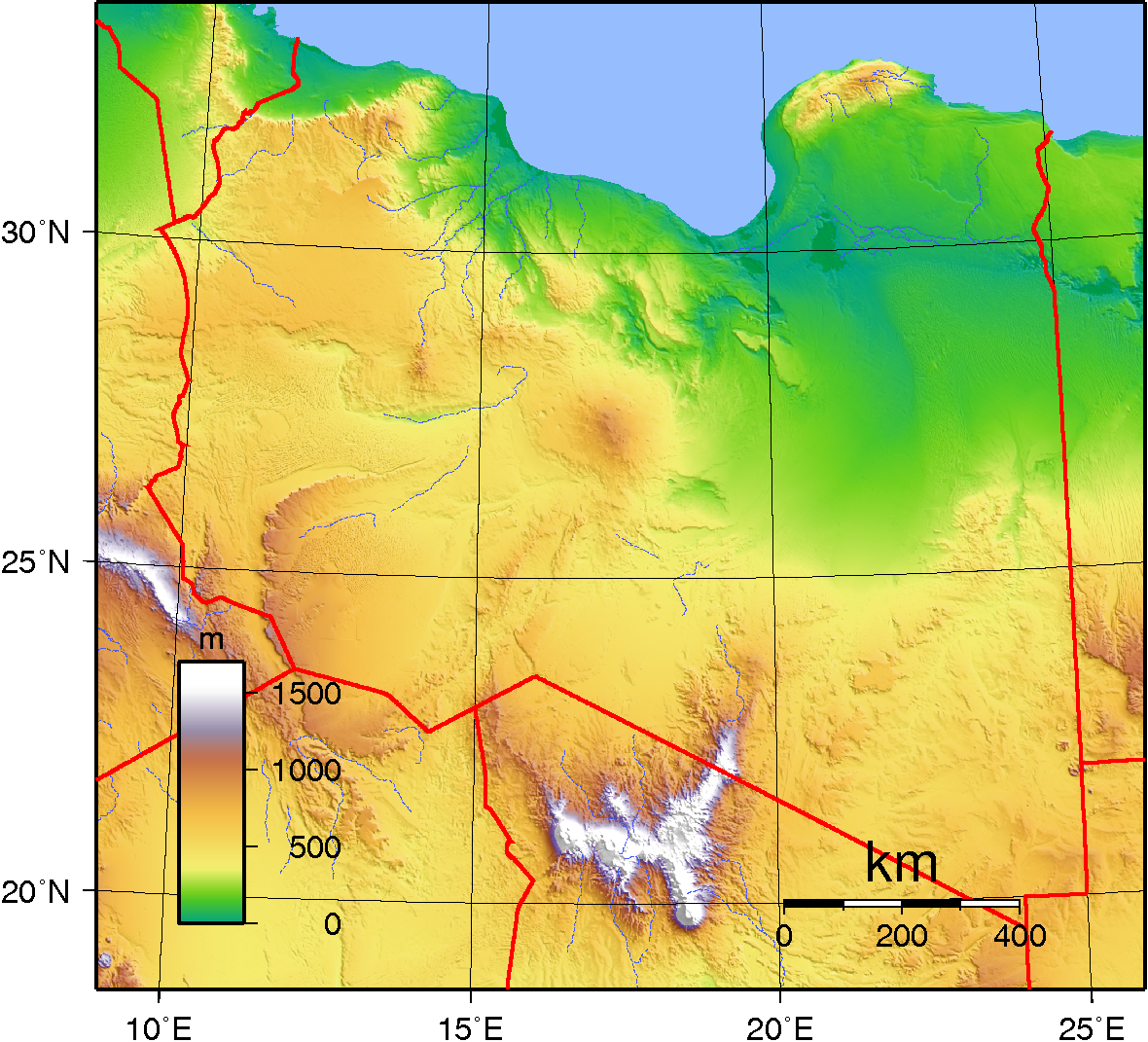
Topography of Libya

The Sarir stratigraphic column generally resembles succession patterns throughout the Sirte Basin, with some variations. In the early regressive phase, basal sandstones were deposited on a Precambrian basement of igneous and metamorphic rocks. Sandstones are dated on angiosperm pollen as younger than Albian, probably from the Late Cretaceous. After a lengthy hiatus, represented by unconformity and sandstone erosion, a transgressive sequence of red, green, and purple Anhydrite shales was laid. Variegated bed remnants occur in crestal sections of many northern structures, such as in wells B-1-65 and C-1-80.

Above the transgressive sequence are Late Cretaceous shales with tight, micritic carbonate, marking the top of the Mesozoic. These shales thicken into troughs, providing the field's sole source rock. The youngest fauna are Maastrichtian, with an apparent disconformity between the Late Cretaceous and Paleocene, marked by high levels of gamma radiation on logs.

The Paleocene is also a carbonate-shale succession with carbonate build-ups over structural highs, forming some of the basin's best reservoirs. Although thick carbonates exist over the field and other highs in C-65 and surrounding areas, no hydrocarbons were found. Reservoir water is usually fresh or brackish, suggesting flushing. Limestones were extensively dolomitized, resulting in large cavities and lost circulation while drilling.

In the Lower Eocene, Basin conditions became restricted, producing an alternating dolomite and anhydrite sequence with a consistent thickness. The mid-Eocene saw development of a wide carbonate platform, richly nummulitic, also constant in thickness. There are argillaceous limestone interbeds, marl, and occasional calcareous sandstones. The Late Eocene reflects more frequent lateral variations of interbedded limestones, dolomites, marls, and shales.

Recent to Oligocene succession consists of; (1) lower zone of fine to coarse sands with some clay partings and dolomite beds; (2) middle zone of gray-green, red-brown shales and clays; and (3) an upper zone of largely unconsolidated, slightly feldspathic sands. This is typical of the area where total thickness is 914 m, almost equally divided into the three main components.

== Trap ==
Sarir C is contained in a structural-stratigraphic trap, represented by dips to the east, south, and west and the major northeast-southwest-trending fault on its northwest flank. In much of the central and northwest, the reservoir subcrops and is sealed by shales that unconformably overlie it. Minor sand accumulations in the transgressive series above the basal sands occur in updip, pinchout traps.

Sarir C's main trap is not full to the spill point, which is downplunge on the ridge west of the structure. The oil column has a maximum height of 91 m, with a 122 m vertical closure. Crude distribution in the trap is affected by lithological variation. Oil-water levels are common in the main reservoir members, but the transgressive series is 43 m higher.

Sarir North is a separate trap with its own oil-water contact, 30 m deeper than Sarir C. L-65 also has an independent oil-water contact. The field has no gas cap; petroleum has a low gas-oil ratio between 60-225 standard ft3/bbl. Some crude differentiation occurs, probably due to gravity separation. Overall, it consists of a fairly light, waxy crude having a mean gravity of 37° API, wax content of 19%, and a sulfur content under 0.25%. The pour point ranges from 12° to 24 °C.

Gravity segregation of crude in the trap produced a peripheral tar mat in permeable intervals of the reservoir intersecting the oil-water level. The tar mat varies in thickness, reaching a 21 m maximum in the east. Viscous oil from the top of the tar mat has a mean gravity of 24°-25° API, a pour point of about 71 °C, wax content of 15%, and an asphaltene content of 14-22%.

== Terror Activity ==
Output from El Sarrir field was shut in after a bomb attack on 16 February 2015 damaged the field’s pipeline to Libya’s only operating land based oil port.

== See also ==
- United States Geological Survey
