= 2026 Zawiya refinery drone attacks =

Drone strikes in Libya

- Part of Libyan crisis
- Location: 32.78336°N 12.70193°E; Zawiya, Libya
- Date: 8 August 2026 – 14 August 2026
- Target: Zawiya Refinery
- Weapon: Drones
- Deaths: 0
- Injuries: 0
- Motive: Suspected rivalry between armed groups for Zawiya's resources

The 2026 Zawiya refinery drone attacks is a series of unclaimed drone attacks targeting the Zawiya refinery. Libya's largest operating refinery with a capacity of 120,000 barrels per day.

== Zawiya refinery ==
The Zawiya refinery is Libya's largest operating oil refinery, located approximately 40 kilometers (25 miles) west of Tripoli on the Mediterranean coast. Built in 1974 by the Italian company Snamprogetti and operated by the Zawia Oil Refining Company (a subsidiary of the National Oil Corporation), it has a processing capacity of about 120,000 barrels per day. The refinery is connected to the Sharara oilfield, Libya's largest active oilfield with a production capacity of 300,000 barrels per day. It serves as the main fuel supply hub for western Libya and generates approximately $1 million in revenue per day.

It has been repeatedly affected by Libya's internal instability, In December 2024, NOC declared force majeure after gunfire triggered fires in numerous storage tanks. Similar events happened in September 2025.

== Background ==
Tensions escalated in early August 2026. On 4 August 2026 overnight clashes between rival armed groups in Zawiya and the nearby city of Surman killed 4 people and injured 10 others. The GNU's joint security room launched a large scale operation targeting "outlaws" in Zawiya shortly after the incident.

== Attack ==
On 8 August 2026, At approximately 3:45 am local time, a drone struck the wall of untreated naphtha tank No. 1-7 at the Zawiya refinery. The drone exploded on impact, creating two holes and causing a naphtha leak. Company personnel contained the incident and stopped the leak. No fire broke out and no casualties were reported. The company appealed to all parties to protect the refinery's facilities and expressed concern over military equipment within its premises. Two days later, on 10 August, a drone hit a gasoline-storage tank at the Zawiya oil complex. The tank contained approximately 4.5 million liters of gasoline when struck, causing a major fire and the tank's collapse. According to the Brega Oil Marketing Company, the attack also destroyed a tank containing around 13 million liters of gasoline, triggering a fire that burned for several days before being brought under control. The fires did not damage the refinery itself, though production was briefly disrupted.

Drone attacks continued through 11 August, where a drone landed near a second tank without causing any casualties or damage, firefighters battled a massive blaze for 15 hours following a strike on a fuel laden tank. On 12 August, the South Zawiya electricity substation was struck by a drone causing it to set ablaze and causing widespread outages all over Western Libya. After the incident Libya's state-run General Electricity Company said more than 700 megawatts of the nearby power plant's 1,300-megawatt capacity remained unavailable. Another drone fell near the main fuel tank feeding the station. US energy company GE suspended work and withdrew its technical teams due to security concerns. On 14 August, NOC threatened to declare force majeure and declared a state of maximum emergency in the area, Libyan Ministry of Defence warned of "decisive action" against those responsible, describing the attacks as "systematic hostile acts" threatening national security, stability and the economy. It stated its "patience is beginning to run out" and that repeated attacks would no longer be met with warnings alone. An agreement was reportedly reached between the government and armed groups to temporarily avert a military offensive on Zawiya.

On 15 August, an explosion knocked multiple electricity generators offline, The General Electricity Company said teams began investigating the cause and working to gradually restore service. The blast caused widespread blackouts across Tripoli and western Libya. Videos shared online showed a thick column of smoke rising from the plant. This came approximately one week after unidentified drone attacks targeted critical infrastructure including oil storage tanks, desalination facilities and power infrastructure. On 16 August, RFI quoting multiple military sources suggested that Ukrainian-made FPV drones using fiber-optic technology may have been deployed in the attacks. According to the Washington Times, these attacks were a major blow to the Trump Administration's strategy to open Libyan oil as an alternative to Gulf supplies during the 2026 Iran War.
