= Waha field =

Oilfield in Sirte Basin, Libya

Waha Field
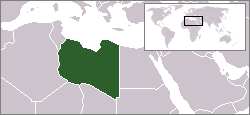
- Country: Libya
- Location/block: Sirte Basin
- Offshore/onshore: Onshore
- Coordinates: 28.299°N 19.922°E
- Operators: Waha Oil Company
- Partners: National Oil Corporation

Field history
- Discovery: 1961
- Start of production: 1969
- Peak of production: NA
- Abandonment: NA

Production
- Current production of oil: 350,000 barrels per day (~1.7×10^{7} t/a)
- Producing formations: NA

Waha field is an oil field located in the Libya Sirte basin and owned by the Waha Oil Company (WOC), which is a subsidiary of the National Oil Corporation (NOC). During 2006, the Waha fields produced around 350,000 barrels (56,000 m^{3}) per day, down from around 1 Mbbl/d (160,000 m^{3}/d) in 1969 and 400,000 bbl/d (64,000 m^{3}/d) in 1986. However, WOC expects to increase Waha output by around 200,000 bbl/d (32,000 m^{3}/d) over the next couple of years. In 2005, ConocoPhillips and co-venturers reached an agreement with NOC to both return to its operations in Libya and to extend the Waha concession by another 25 years. ConocoPhillips operates the Waha fields with a 16.33% share in the project. NOC has the largest share of the Waha concession at 59.17%, and additional partners include Marathon Oil (16.33%), and Amerada Hess (8.17%). The Waha oil field was captured by ISIS soldiers on March 5, 2015 but has since been recaptured.
