= Basin and range topography =

Alternating landscape of parallel mountain ranges and valleys

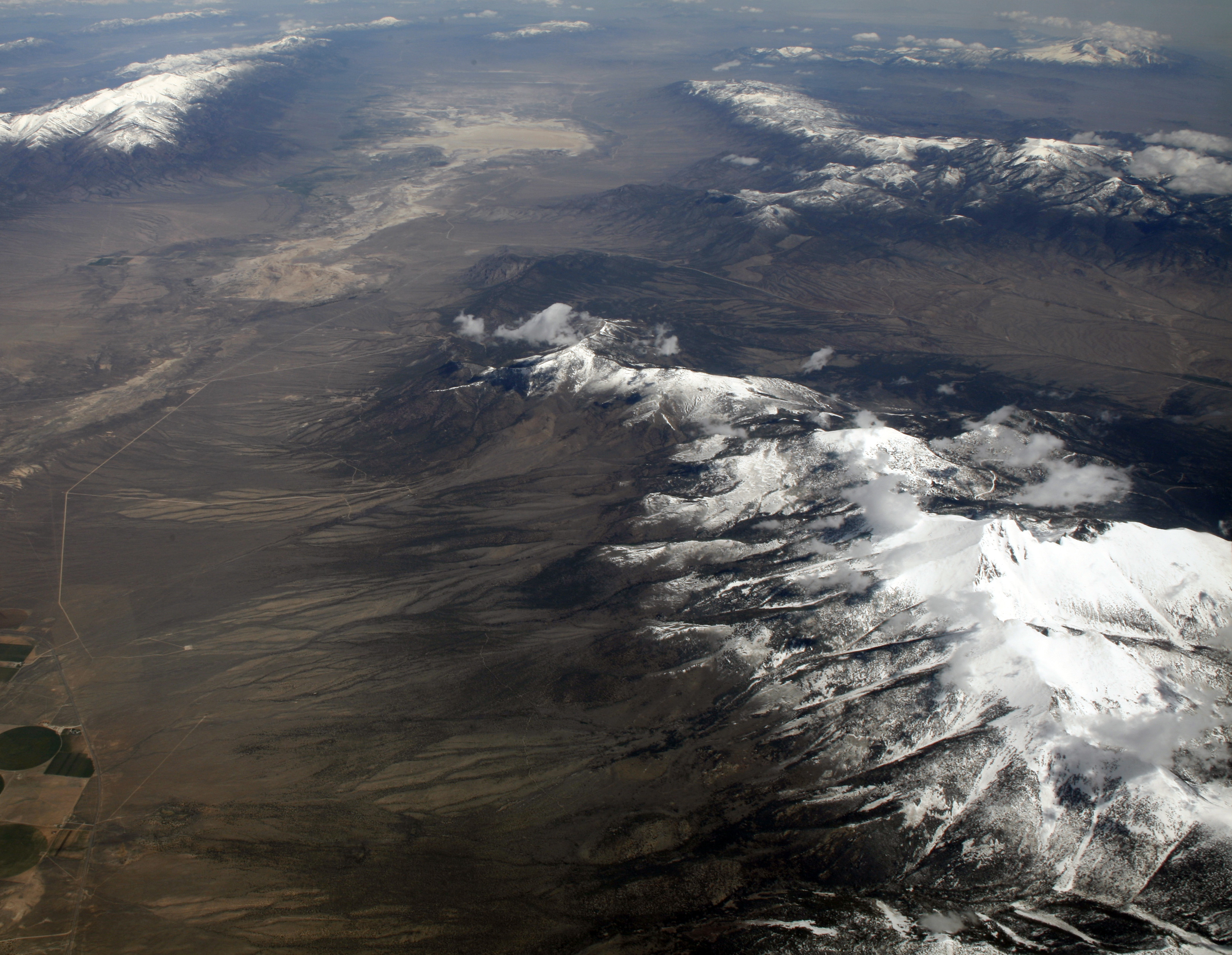
Basin and range topography has alternating parallel mountain ranges and valleys

Basin and range topography is characterized by alternating parallel mountain ranges and valleys. It is a result of crustal extension due to mantle upwelling, gravitational collapse, crustal thickening, or relaxation of confining stresses. The extension results in the thinning and deformation of the upper crust, causing it to fracture and create a series of long parallel normal faults. This results in block faulting, where the blocks of rock between the normal faults either subside, uplift, or tilt. The movement of these blocks results in the alternating valleys and mountains. As the crust thins, it also allows heat from the mantle to more easily melt rock and form magma, resulting in increased volcanic activity.

== Types of faulting ==
Horst and graben structure

=== Symmetrical faulting: horst and graben ===
With crustal extension, a series of normal faults which occur in groups, form in close proximity and dip in opposite directions. As the crust extends it fractures in series of fault planes, some blocks sink down due to gravity, creating long linear valleys or basins also known as grabens, while the blocks remaining up or uplifted produce mountains or ranges, also known as horsts. Fault scarps are exposed on the horst block and expose the footwall of the normal fault. This is a type of block faulting known as grabens and horsts. This basin and range topography is symmetrical having equal slopes on both sides of the valleys and mountain ranges.

Timelapse of tilted block faulting

=== Asymmetric faulting: tilted block faulting ===
Tilted block faulting, also known as half-graben or rotational block faulting, can also occur during extension. Large gently dipping normal faults, also known as detachment faults, act as platforms in which normal faulted blocks tilt or slide along. However, instead of the whole block subsiding only one side, the block may slip along the detachment fault, tilting toward the fault plane, again creating mountains (ranges) and valleys (basins), many tilted slightly in one direction at their tops due to the motion of their bottoms along the main detachment fault. This basin and range topography has one steep side and the other is more gradual.

== Examples ==
=== Basin and Range Province ===
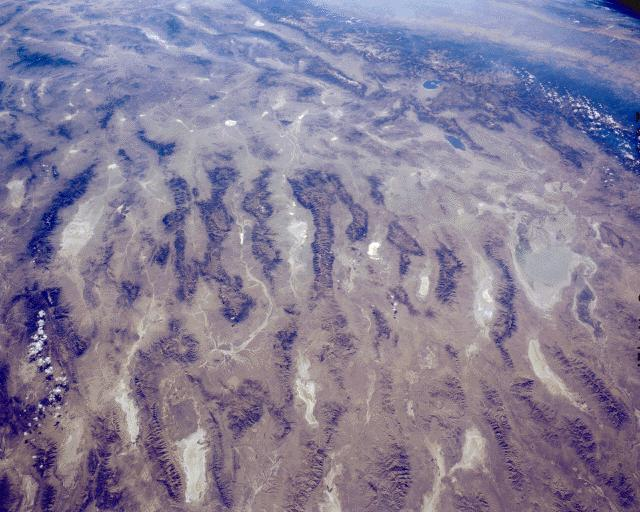
View of the Basin and Range Province from space

The Basin and Range Province in the southwestern United States and northwestern Mexico is the most well-known example of basin and range topography. Clarence Dutton compared the many narrow parallel mountain ranges that distinguish the unique topography of the Basin and Range to an "army of caterpillars crawling northward."

The physiography of the province is the result of tectonic extension that began around 17 million years ago in the early Miocene epoch. Opinions vary regarding the total extension of the region; however, the median estimate is about 100% total lateral extension. The tectonic mechanisms responsible for lithospheric extension in the Basin and Range province are controversial, and several competing hypotheses attempt to explain them.

=== Aegean Sea Plate ===
The Aegean Sea Plate consists of thinned continental crust. The northern part of the plate is currently a region of crustal extension caused by slab rollback on the Hellenic Subduction Zone to the south, causing extensive normal faulting and the formation of horsts and grabens on the seafloor. Many of the islands are the result of peaks reaching above sea level.

== Mapping extension ==
One of the most studied basin and range topographies is the Basin and Range Province in the western United States, located between the Sierra Nevada and the Rocky Mountains. The extension of the province was believed to have begun in the late Cenozoic Era, roughly 20 Ma. Between 1992 and 1998 scientists conducted GPS surveys to map the deformation of the Basin and Range province. In the study, Thatcher et al. discovered that most deformation was happening in the west, adjacent to the Sierra Nevada block, while less deformation was happening in the east. This coincides with the northwestward movement of the Sierra Nevada microplate.

Though the Aegean Sea Plate is more difficult to study because it is underwater, efforts have been made to conduct GPS surveys of the seafloor and surrounding area. Some studies show regions of extension within the plate, while others suggest a four-microplate model to represent the motion. The plate's deformation is thought to be a result of crustal collapse (beginning c. 14 Ma) combined with slab rollback on the Hellenic Subduction Zone.

== See also ==
- Bolson
- Endorheic basin
