= Horst and graben =

Topography consisting of alternating raised and lowered fault blocks

Diagram of horsts and grabens

In geology, horst and graben (or range and valley) describes topography consisting of alternating raised and lowered fault blocks known as horsts and grabens. The features are created by normal faulting and rifting caused by crustal extension. Horsts and grabens are formed when normal faults of opposite dip occur in pairs with parallel strike, and are always formed together. Each feature can range in size from a few centimeters up to tens of kilometers, and the vertical displacement can be up to several thousand meters. The movement on either side of each block is typically equal, resulting in little tilting.

== Features ==
=== Horst ===
A horst is a section of crust that has been lifted relative to the blocks on either side, which is a result of its bounding faults dipping away from each other. Horsts can form features such as plateaus, mountain ranges or ridges on either side of the valleys.

=== Graben ===
A graben is a section of crust that has lowered relative to the blocks on either side, which is a result of its bounding faults dipping towards each other. The plural of graben can be either graben or grabens. Graben form low-lying features such as basins and rift valleys. They can be very long relative to their width.

== Examples ==
- The Basin and Range Province in the western United States is an extensive region of alternating valleys and ridges caused by horst and graben as well as tilted block faulting.
- The Condroz and Ardennes regions of Wallonia are good examples of a succession of horst and graben.
- The Satpura Range is a horst in India and is flanked by Narmada Graben in the north and much smaller but parallel Tapi Graben in the south.

== See also ==
- Rift (geology)
- Half-graben
- Basin and range topography
