= Waha Oil Company =

Oil company in Libya

- Industry: Petroleum
- Headquarters: Tripoli, Libya
- Key people: Dr. Fathi M. Ben-Zahia (Chairman); A.M. Almajbry; R. Mong
- Products: Exploration; Oil and gas
- Number of employees: 5500
- Website: Official website

Waha Oil Company (WOC; Arabic: شركة الواحة للنفط, shirkat al-wāḥa lil-nifṭ) is an oil company based in Tripoli, Libya, engaged in the fields of crude oil and natural gas exploration and production.

== Overview ==
WOC is involved in upstream activities, including oil exploration, drilling, production and shipping. They operate four oil fields, the largest being the Waha oil field.

== History ==
WOC was established in 1956 and its first oil discovery was made in 1959, in Dahra field. In 1962, WOC began pumping oil to a terminal operated by Conoco, Amerada Hess and Marathon. In 1968, Shell joined the consortium, purchasing shares from Amerada Hess. In 1973, after the Al-Fatah Revolution, company shares were split between these companies (49%) and NOC (51%). In 1974, Shell declined to sign this agreement and NOC bought their shares, making the split 59-41%. This resulted in the formation of Oasis Oil Company. In 1986, former U.S. President Ronald Reagan issued an Executive Order to all U.S. oil companies to withdraw from Libya. This led to an agreement between NOC and the U.S. oil companies to freeze previous agreements for three years, pending review. However, once economic sanctions were established they never returned. After this, NOC became the sole owner of WOC. In 2002, the previous parties involved re-established communications with NOC and WOC.

On 20 September 2004, President George W. Bush signed Executive Order 12543, lifting most remaining U.S. sanctions against Libya and paving the way for U.S. oil companies to try to secure contracts or revive previous contracts for tapping Libya’s oil reserves. The Order also revoked any restrictions on importation of oil products refined in Libya, and unblocked certain assets.

In October 2013, Libya’s National Oil Corporation announced it was considering acquiring Marathon Oil’s stake in Waha.

== Oil Fields ==
1. Waha field
2. Gialo High
3. Samah field
4. Dahra field
5. Sidra (crude depot and loading terminal)
