= Arabian Gulf Oil Company =

Oil company based in Libya

Arabian Gulf Oil Company شركة الخليج العربي للنفط
- Company type: State-owned
- Industry: Petroleum
- Founded: 1979
- Headquarters: Benghazi, Libya
- Key people: Salah.Elqutrani (Chairman)
- Products: Exploration; Oil and gas
- Website: Official website

The Arabian Gulf Oil Company (Agoco; Arabic: شركة الخليج العربي للنفط) is an oil company based in Benghazi, Libya, engaged in crude oil and natural gas exploration, production and refining. It was a subsidiary of the state-owned National Oil Corporation (NOC).

== Overview ==
=== Agoco Fields ===
The Sarir field was discovered in the Sirte Basin by BP in 1961 is considered the country's largest field. The Messla field was discovered in 1971 and is situated 500 km southeast of Benghazi and is also considered one of the biggest fields in the Sirte basin. Nafoora field is situated in the northeastern part of the Sirte basin and discovered in early 1965.

== 2011 Libyan civil war ==
The Arabian Gulf Oil Company announced plans to use oil funds to support anti-Gaddafi forces.

== See also ==
- List of petroleum companies
