= Raguba field =

Oilfield in Libya

Raguba
- Country: Libya
- Offshore/onshore: Onshore
- Operator: Sirte Oil Company
- Partner: National Oil Company

Field history
- Discovery: 1961
- Start of production: 1963

The Raguba field is an oil field located in the central part of Libya's Sirte Basin in Concession 20. The Sirte Oil Company (SOC) operates the Raguba field. The field is connected by pipeline to the main line between the Nasser field, one of the largest in Libya, and Brega. Raguba field has 80 wells producing high gravity (43 °API) oil. The first exploration oil well in this field was drilled in January 1961 with production commencing in 1963. By the end of 2005, the field had produced 787 million standard barrels of oil and 859×10^{9} cu ft (2.43×10^{10} m^{3}) of associated gas.

== Sirte Basin ==
Libya's onshore oil has been discovered mainly in three geological trends of the Sirte Basin: 1) the western fairway, which includes several large oil fields (Samah, Beida, Raguba, Dahra-Hofra, and Bahi); 2) the north-center of the country, which contains the giant Defa-Waha field and Nasser fields, as well as the large Hateiba gas field; and 3) an easterly trend, which has large fields like Sarir, Messla, Gialo, Bu Attifel, Intisar, Nafoora-Augila, and Amal. Overall, the Sirte Basin contains approximately 80% of Libya's proven oil reserves and accounts for 90% of production.

== See also ==
- List of oil fields
