= Sirte Oil Company =

Libyan oil company

- Company type: State-owned
- Industry: Petroleum
- Founded: 1981
- Headquarters: Brega, Libya
- Key people: ABDALLAH ELSHWAYGY (Chairman)
- Products: Upstream; Downstream
- Number of employees: 8779 (2022)
- Website: Official website

Sirte Oil Company (SOC) (Arabic: شركة سرت للنفط) is an oil and gas company in Libya operating under the state-owned National Oil Corporation (NOC). The company is located in Brega SOC’s operations include oil and gas exploration and production (E&P) and manufacturing.

== Background ==
The company was initially known as Esso Standard Libya Inc., the first company to discover commercial quantities of crude oil in the Zelten oil field. In 1981, Exxon (parent company of Esso Standard) withdrew their Libyan operations, after which Sirte Oil Company was formed as a NOC subsidiary. It was established to operate the former Esso Sirte installation like the Marsa el-Brega refinery.

In 1986, SOC took over the assets of Grace Petroleum, one of the five US companies forced by the U.S. government to leave Libya. In 1991, SOC merged with the National Petrochemical Company, creating the Sirte Oil Company for Production, Manufacturing of Oil and Gas. Activities included oil refining, liquefaction of natural gas and petrochemicals (methanol, ammonia and urea).

In 2000, SOC reportedly made a 13-billion-cubic-meter-per-year natural gas discovery in the Sirte Basin (Africa Energy Intelligence, 2000a, b).

In 2005 SOC signed a $643 million contract with Shell to restore the Marsa el Brega LNG. The complex was damaged after political unrest after the Libyan civil war in 2011 and is out of operation today.

SOC operates the Raguba field in the central part of the Sirte Basin. The field is connected by pipeline to the main line between the Nasser field, one of the largest in Libya, and Brega. As of 2005, besides Nasser, SOC was in charge of two other gas fields - Attahadi and Assumud - plus the Marsa el-Brega liquefied natural gas (LNG) plant. The LNG plant at Brega processed about 900 million cubic meters per year, or about 700,000 metric tons per year, of natural gas, as of 2005.

In 2018 SOC announced the exploration and production of oil and gas in the Sahl field, after they had to stop for four years because of local security problems.

In 2019 SOC announced would conduct corrosion control chemical field trials in 2020 for its gas production facilities.

== Production Overview ==
- Crude Oil Storage: The Tank Farm includes sixteen tanks. The design capacity of each individual tank is 268,000 bbl (42,600 m^{3}).
- Refinery: Capacity for processing 10,000 bbl/d (1,600 m^{3}/d). The products are primarily used to satisfy domestic demand. The production slate includes: (1) gasoline; (2) kerosene jet fuel (Jet A): diesel oil (ADO): naphtha: and heavy fuel oil (HFO).

== SOC Petrochemical Complex ==
SOC's petrochemical complex is located near Brega. It consists of six plants: The combined production capacity for the three products is 6,950 mtpd. All products are marketed by the Brega Marketing Company.

- Methanol plants (2): each having a capacity of 1,000 mtpd (1978 and 1985)
- Ammonia plants (2): one having a capacity of 1,000 mtpd and other with a capacity of 1,200 mtpd (1978 and 1983)
- Urea plants (2): one having a capacity of 1,000 mtpd and another with a capacity of 1,750 mtpd (1981 and 1984).
- Methanol Production: Uses natural gas from SOC’s gas fields for raw material.
- Ammonia Production: SOC’s ammonia-producing plant first converts natural gas (i.e. methane) into gaseous hydrogen. Starting with a natural gas feedstock, the first step in the process entails removal of sulfur compounds from the feedstock, because sulfur deactivates the catalysts used in subsequent steps. Ammonia is produced in liquid form at a temperature of -33 °C.
- Urea Production: Urea is manufactured from ammonia, which comes from SOC’s two ammonia plants.

== SOC Brega Port, Marine and Utility Facilities ==
Brega port exports SOC's oil, crude oil gas and petrochemical products. The port comprises a single and double berthing docks with various depths, cargo docks, jetting and mooring for SOC products.

== Fields ==
SOC has the following fields:

- Oil and Associated Gas Fields
  - Nasser (Zelten)
  - Raguba
  - Lehib (Dor Marada)
  - Jebel
  - Wadi
  - Ralah
  - Arshad
  - Ain Jerbi
  - Al Wafa
- Non-Associated Gas Fields
  - Hateiba
  - Sahl
  - Assamoud
  - Meghil
  - Sorrah
  - Attahaddy
