= Zelten oil field =

Oilfield in Libya

Zelten
- Location of the Zelten oil field within Libya
- Country: Libya
- Location/block: Concession 6
- Offshore/onshore: Onshore
- Coordinates: 28°54′58.7″N 19°46′12.5″E
- Operator: Sirte Oil Company
- Partner: National Oil Company

Field history
- Discovery: 1956
- Start of production: 1961

Production
- Producing formations: Upper Cretaceous, Paleocene and Eocene

The Zelten oil field (now known as the Nasser field) is located at the foot of the Zelten Mountains, about 169 kilometres (105 mi) south of Brega in Concession 6. Zelten holds the title as the largest oil field in the Gulf of Sidra. The 229 wells in Zelten use a gas lifting system.

The Zelten oil field is not associated with the town Zaltan/Zelten, which is located in the North-West corner of Libya, nor with the South Tyrolean fruitcake Zelten.

== Background ==
Discovered in 1956, Zelten was Libya's first major oil well, producing about 17,500 bbl/d (2,780 m^{3}/d). In 1959, its reserves were estimated at 2.5 billion barrels (400,000,000 m^{3}) of 38° API oil, lying at 5,500-7,600 feet. Esso Standard began production of Zelten in 1961. The Zelten gas-lift system was installed during the period from 1969 to 1971 and represented one of the first uses of gas lift on a fieldwide basis to produce the high volume wells typical of Middle East Oil fields. In 1979, approximately 500,000 bbl/d (79,000 m^{3}/d) of total liquid was being produced by gas lift. By 2006, the accumulated production of the Zelten field reached 2,426 mmb of oil and 1,506×10^{9} cu ft (4.26×10^{10} m^{3}) of associated gas.

== Sirte Oil Company ==
The Sirte Oil Company (SOC), a subsidiary of the National Oil Corporation, was originally created in 1981 to take over Exxon's holdings in Libya. In 1986, SOC took over the assets of Grace Petroleum, one of the five US companies forced by the US government to leave Libya in 1996. SOC operates the Raguba field in the central part of the Sirte Basin. The field is connected by pipeline to the main line between the Zelten field and Brega. Besides Zelten, SOC is in charge of two other gas fields (Attahadi and Assumud) plus the Brega liquefied natural gas (LNG) plant.

== Sirte-Zelten Petroleum System ==
There is one dominant petroleum system in the Sirte Basin sourced by the Cretaceous Sirte Shale. In the Central Sirte Basin, carbonates of Upper Cretaceous, Paleocene and Eocene age produce in 150 fields on significant horst blocks or platforms (e.g., the Beda and Zelten platforms). Reservoirs are largely carbonate build-ups and reefs with some offshore production in the Gulf of Sidra. Carbonate reservoirs are largely related to two Upper Cretaceous and two Paleocene cycles of sedimentation in a syn-rift fill sequence; however, there is minor Mid-Cretaceous calcarenite production. Giant oil fields in this unit include Intistar, Beda, Defa, Waha, Haram, Zelten (Nasser), Hofra and Nafoora.

Upper Cretaceous Sirte Shale of the Rakb Group is the dominant source rock. Geochemical data of 81 oils demonstrate that the Sirte Shale generates a low sulfur, high gravity oil with low gas oil ratios. Generation began in Eocene era and continues to present. Onshore the petroleum is dominantly oil; however, offshore increased thermal gradients and deeper burial suggest higher gas oil ratios and natural gas potential. The Upper Cretaceous carbonate reservoirs are commonly dolomites whereas the lower Paleocene cycles include calcilutites, calcarenites, oolites and skeletal debris. The petroleum system is named after the Zelten Formation, which was deposited in this latter Paleocene transgression.

== See also ==
- List of oil fields
