= Bolson =

Desert valley or depression

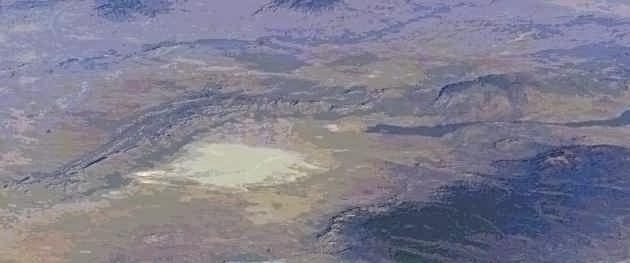
View from the International Space Station of Lake Lucero in the Tularosa Basin, an example of a bolson.

A bolson is a desert valley or depression, usually draining into a playa or salt pan, and entirely surrounded by recently uplifted hills or mountains. Bolsons are sites of active deposition of sediments (aggradation). They are a type of endorheic basin characteristic of basin and range topography.

The term was an Americanism originating in the 1830s and 1840s during the explorations of the far west of North America, particularly of what became the Southwestern United States and northern Mexico. It was derived from the Spanish bolsón (large purse).

Examples of this type of formation would be the Hueco Bolson in the western Trans-Pecos of Texas, and the Mesilla Bolson in southern New Mexico and the northeastern part of Chihuahua, Mexico.

Water can accumulate over millennia in deep sediments to form a bolson aquifer. Many have been tapped for human use.
