= Zawia Oil Refining Company =

Zawia Oil Refining Company شركة الزاوية لتكرير النفط
- Company type: State-owned
- Industry: Petroleum industry
- Founded: 1976
- Headquarters: Libya
- Products: Kerosene; Naphtha; Crude oil Gasoline; Fuel oil
- Website: www.arc.com.ly

The Zawia Oil Refining Company (ARC) is a subsidiary of the National Oil Corporation (NOC), incorporated under Libyan Commercial Law since 1976. ARC operates the Zawia Refinery, which was built in 1974 by Snamprogetti, Italy. Zawia is currently the country's second largest oil refinery after the Ra's Lanuf Refinery. Primary products include naphtha, gasoline, kerosene, light vacuum gas oil (VGO), fuel oil, base lubricating oils, and asphalt.

== Overview ==
In 1974, ARC began production with a nameplate capacity of 60,000 barrels (9,500 m^{3}) per stream day and in 1977, capacity doubled to 120,000 barrels (19,000 m^{3}) per stream day.

Two naphtha hydrotreaters remove and decrease sulfur compounds, nitrogen compounds and other heavy metallic compounds and prepare feedstock for catalytic reformers. Each unit is also accompanied with a splitter to separate light and heavy naphtha. The two platforming units utilizes heavy naphtha as feedstock produces reformate, which is used as blending stock for gasoline production. The Platforming unit also produces LPG as a bye-product. Two kerosene hydrotreaters are utilized to produce desulfurised kerosene or Jet A-1. Capacity of each unit is 9,650 barrels (1,530 m^{3}) per stream day. NOC is expected to re-tender an engineering, procurement and construction contract for upgrading the Zawia refinery.

Plant type	No. units	Capacity (bbl/d)	Capacity (m^{3}/d)	Comment
Atmospheric Distillation	2	120,000	19,000	
Catalytic hydrotreater	1	16,500	2,620	
Vacuum unit	1	2,500	400	
Platforming unit	2	7,850	1,248	Capacity per unit
Naptha hydroeater	2	11,300	1,800	Capacity per unit

== Zawia Oil Terminal ==
The Zawia oil terminal is operated by ARC. The terminal is located in northwestern Libya at 32.803714°N 12.688911°E constituting the harbour facility of the refinery. It has a single point mooring buoy, 27 m deep to accommodate vessels up to 100,000 tons capacity, 30 m deep to accommodate vessels up to 140,000 tons, and 23 m deep to accommodate 5,000 to 20,000 tons products for loading and unloading. The terminal comprises three offshore berths, located northeast of the refinery. On average, more than 200 oil tankers call at the terminal annually. In 2000, 195 tankers called at the terminal, 213 in 2001 and 215 in 2002 respectively.
