= Zawiya Refinery =

Oil refinery in Zawiya, Libya

The Zawia or Zawiya Refinery is an oil refinery located in Zawiya, Libya, which is about 40 kilometres (25 mi) west of Tripoli.

The refinery was opened in 1974 and it currently produces an estimated 120,000 barrels (19,000 m^{3}) of oil products per day (bpd). It is a topping and reforming refinery having a distillation capacity of 6,000 tonnes per annum. The refinery is operated by the Zawia Oil Refining Company, a subsidiary of the National Oil Corporation. NOC is expected to re-tender an engineering, procurement and construction contract for upgrading the Zawia refinery.

== Refinery Expansion and Rehabilitation 2006 ==
This project is aimed at increasing the capacity of the refinery from 120,000 bbl/d (19,000 m^{3}/d) by 24 percent, which will involve the installation of a new continuous catalytic reformer (CCR) unit, naphtha and gas-oil hydrotreaters and an isomerisation unit, as well as the installation of pneumatic control units and a supervisory control & data acquisition (SCADA) system. The project is being financed by the Libyan government.
