= Horst (geology) =

Raised fault block bounded by normal faults

Diagram of horsts and grabens

A horst, in physical geography and geology, is a raised fault block bounded by normal faults. Horsts are typically found together with grabens. While a horst is lifted or remains stationary, the grabens on either side subside. This is often caused by extensional forces pulling apart the crust. Horsts may represent features such as plateaus, mountains, or ridges on either side of a valley. Horsts can range in size from small fault blocks up to large regions of stable continent that have not been folded or warped by tectonic forces.

The word Horst, apart from being a common name, in general German refers to an "eagle's nest". The actual older meaning is "(wooded) hill top", "mass" or "heap", basically anything elevated. The term, as used in "Bergmannssprache", the special "language" of miners, was first adopted in the geological sense in 1883 by Eduard Suess in The Face of the Earth. (Note: Originally published in 1883 in German as "Das Antlitz der Erde", translated and published in English in 1904)

== Geomorphology ==
Horsts may have either symmetrical or asymmetrical cross-sections. If the normal faults to either side have similar geometry and are moving at the same rate, the horst is likely to be symmetrical and roughly flat on top. If the faults on either side have different rates of vertical motion, the top of the horst will most likely be inclined and the entire profile will be asymmetrical. Erosion also plays a significant role in how symmetrical a horst appears in cross-section.

== Horsts and hydrocarbon exploration ==
Horsts can form structural petroleum traps. In many rift basins around the world, the vast majority of discovered hydrocarbons are found in conventional traps associated with horsts. For example, much of the petroleum found in the Sirte Basin, Libya (of the order of tens of billions of barrels of reserves) are found on large horst blocks such as the Zelten Platform and the Dahra Platform and on smaller horsts such as the Gialo High.

== Examples ==
Omberg, a horst in Sweden

The Vosges Mountains in France and Black Forest in Germany are examples of horsts, as are the Table, Jura, the Dole mountains and the Rila – Rhodope Massif including the well defined horsts of Belasitsa (linear horst), Rila mountain (vaulted domed shaped horst) and Pirin mountain – a horst forming a massive anticline situated between the complex graben valleys of Struma and that of Mesta.

Larger areas where the continent remains stable with horizontal table-land stratification can be considered horsts, such as the Russian Plain, Arabia, India and Central South Africa. This is in distinction to folded regions such as some mountain chains of Eurasia.

The Midcontinent Rift System in North America is marked by a series of horsts extending from Lake Superior to Kansas.

The Rwenzori Mountains in the East African Rift are an upthrown fault block, and are the highest non-volcanic, non-orogenic mountains in the world.

The Vosges Mountains in France were formed by isostatic uplift in response to the opening of the Rhine Graben, a major extensional basin.

Another example of a horst in France is the Canigou (or Canigó) massif, near the eastern end of the Pyrenees. It is underlain by Paleozoic granite and gneiss, and Ediacaran metasediments. Rising to an altitude of 2785 metres (over 9,000 feet), the massif is approximately 20 kilometres from north to south and 15 kilometres from west to east. The Massif du Canigou rises distinctly, and in many places abruptly, from surrounding landscapes. In this respect, it is said to be "exceptional in France". For example, it rises by more than 2000 metres from Vernet-les-Bains, at the north-western foot of the massif, to the summit, in less than seven kilometres. On all sides (except the south) normal faults lie close to the line of that prominent topographical change. Uplift of the Canigou massif has taken place during the past 30 million years, at variable rates. That is associated with tectonic extension during the same period, with such extension having also caused the development of nearby geological basins, such as that of the Roussillon Plain. Uplift of the Canigou massif may still be taking place.

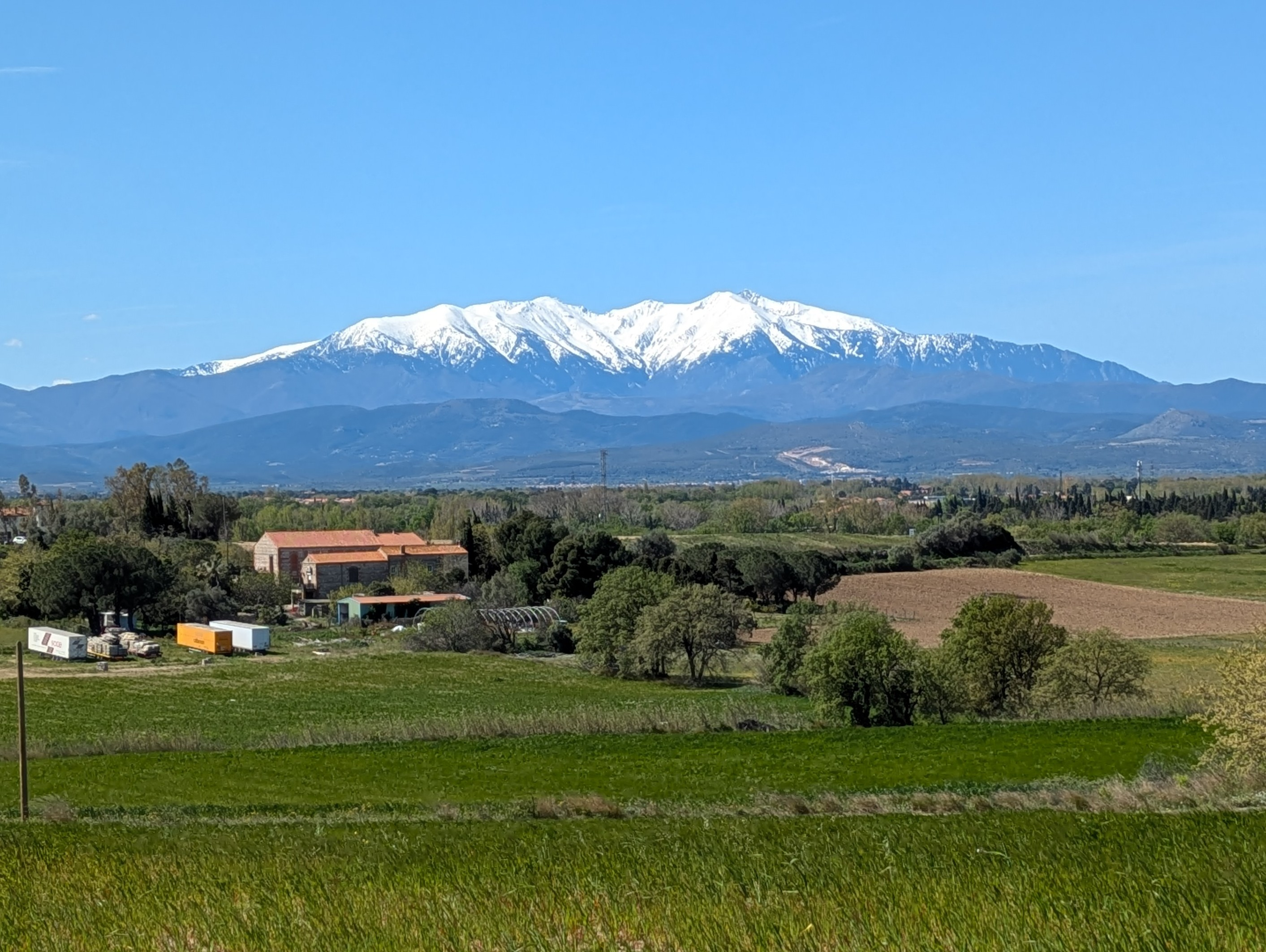
The Canigou massif seen from the north-east, from the Roussillon Plain, near Perpignan.

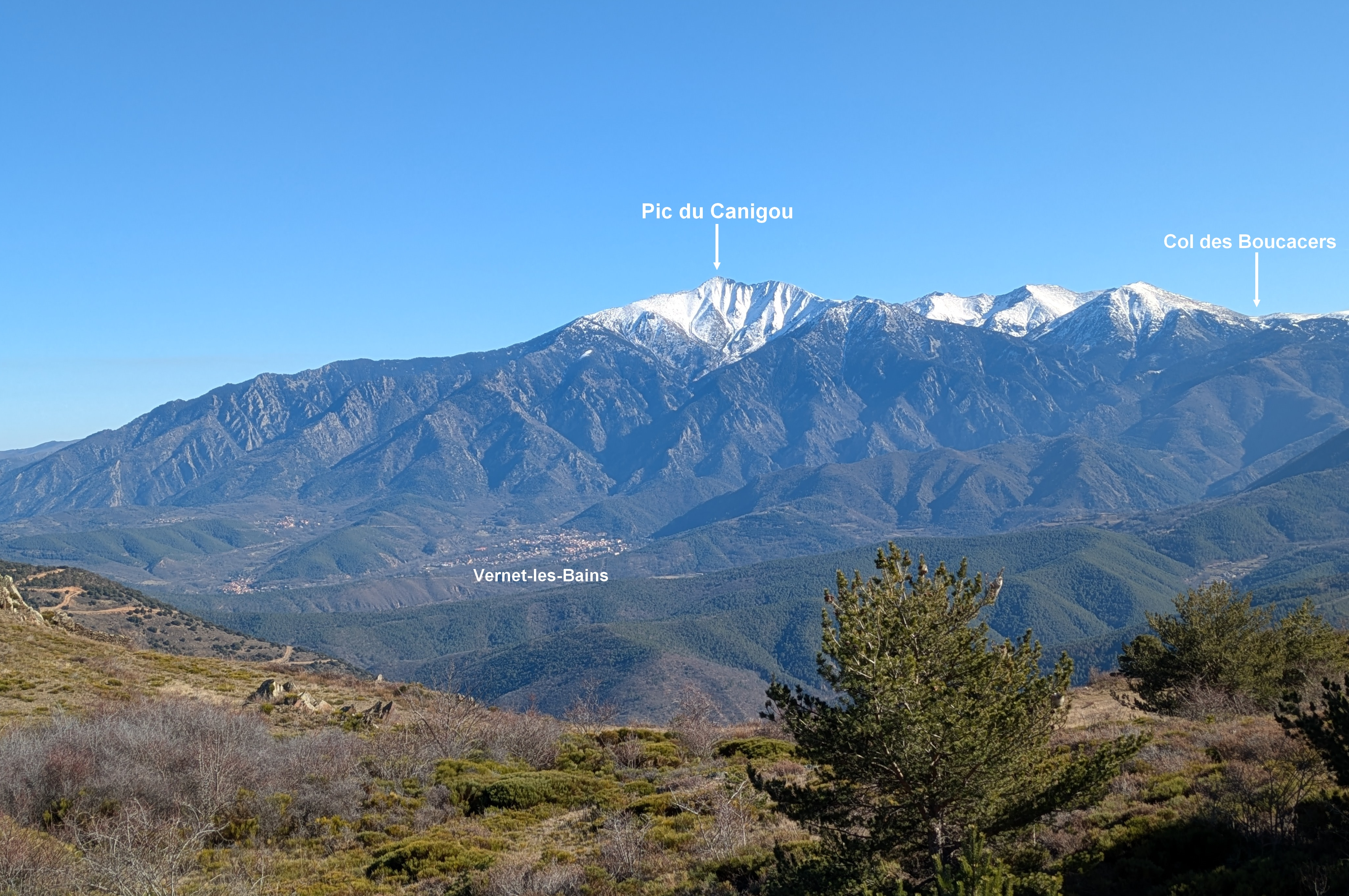
The Canigou massif seen from the north-west.

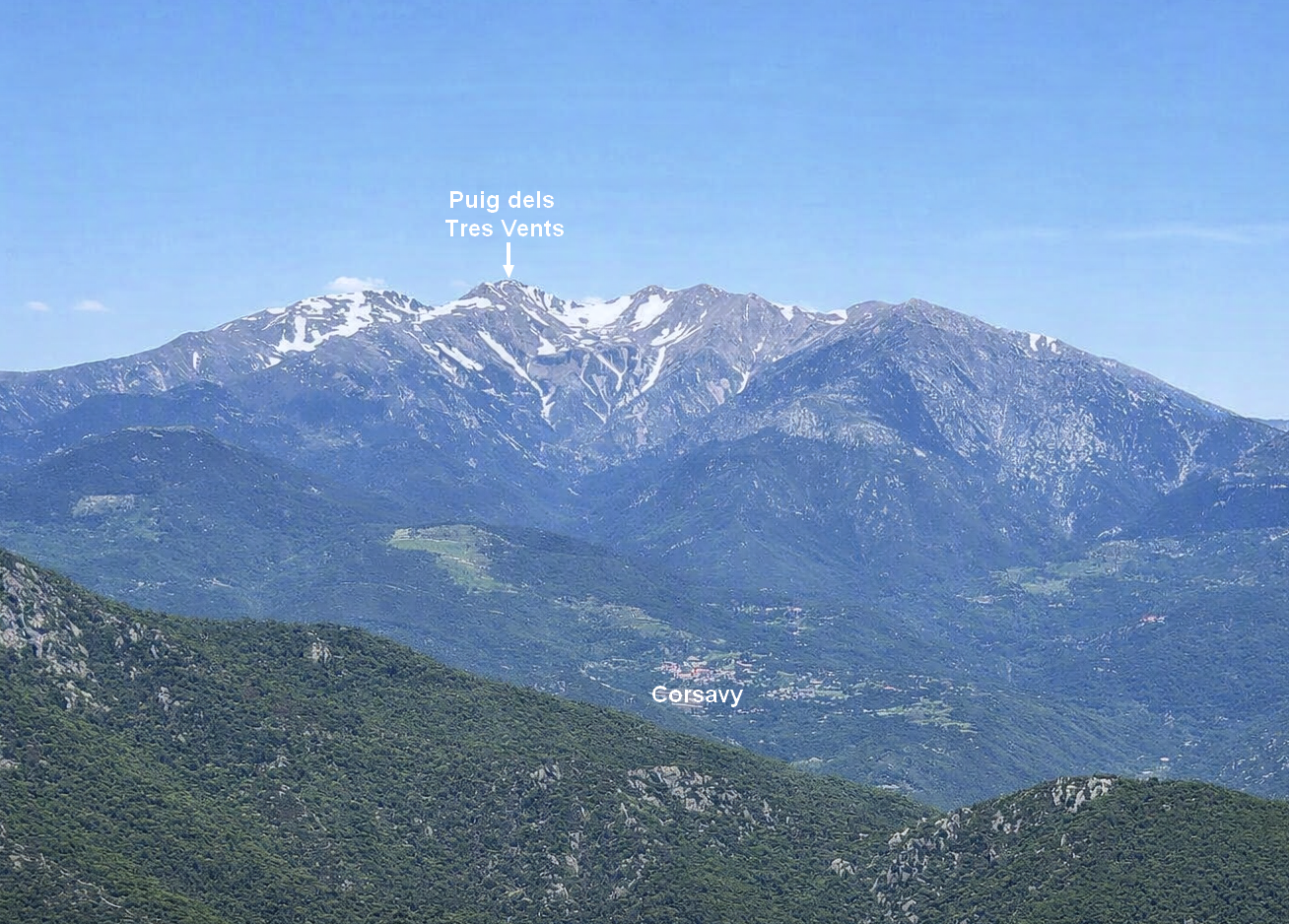
The Canigou massif seen from the south-east.
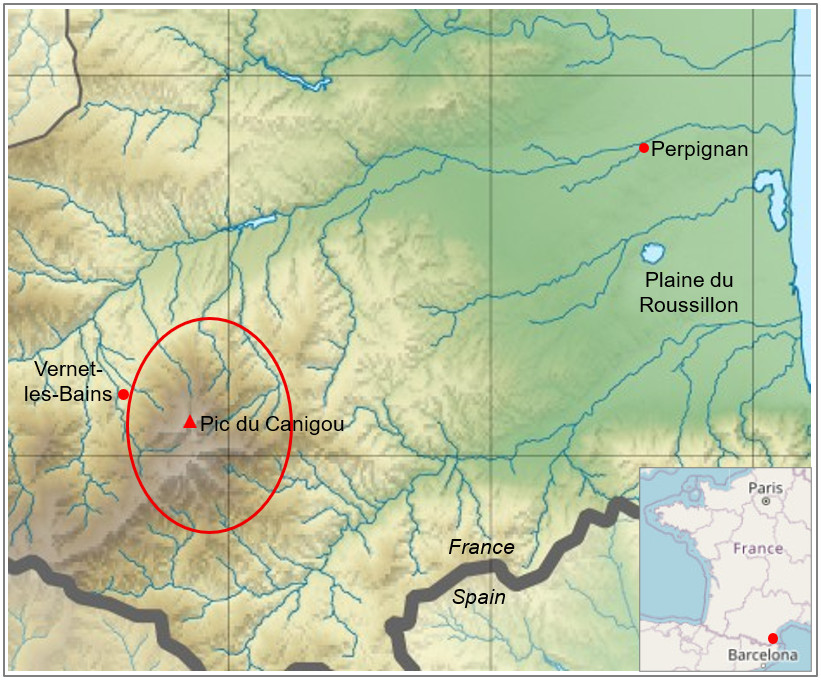
Sketch map to show location of the Canigou massif.

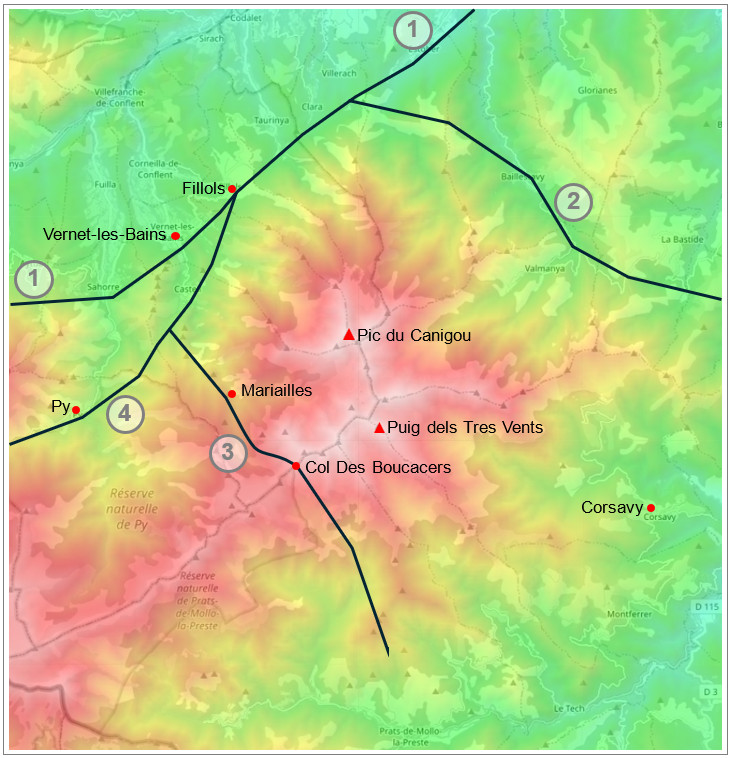
Normal faults around the Canigou massif. 1 - Têt; 2 - Aspres; 3 - Mariailles; 4 - Fillols-Py.

== See also ==
- Horst and graben
- Basin and range topography
- Fault-block mountain
- Plateau
