= Tilted block faulting =

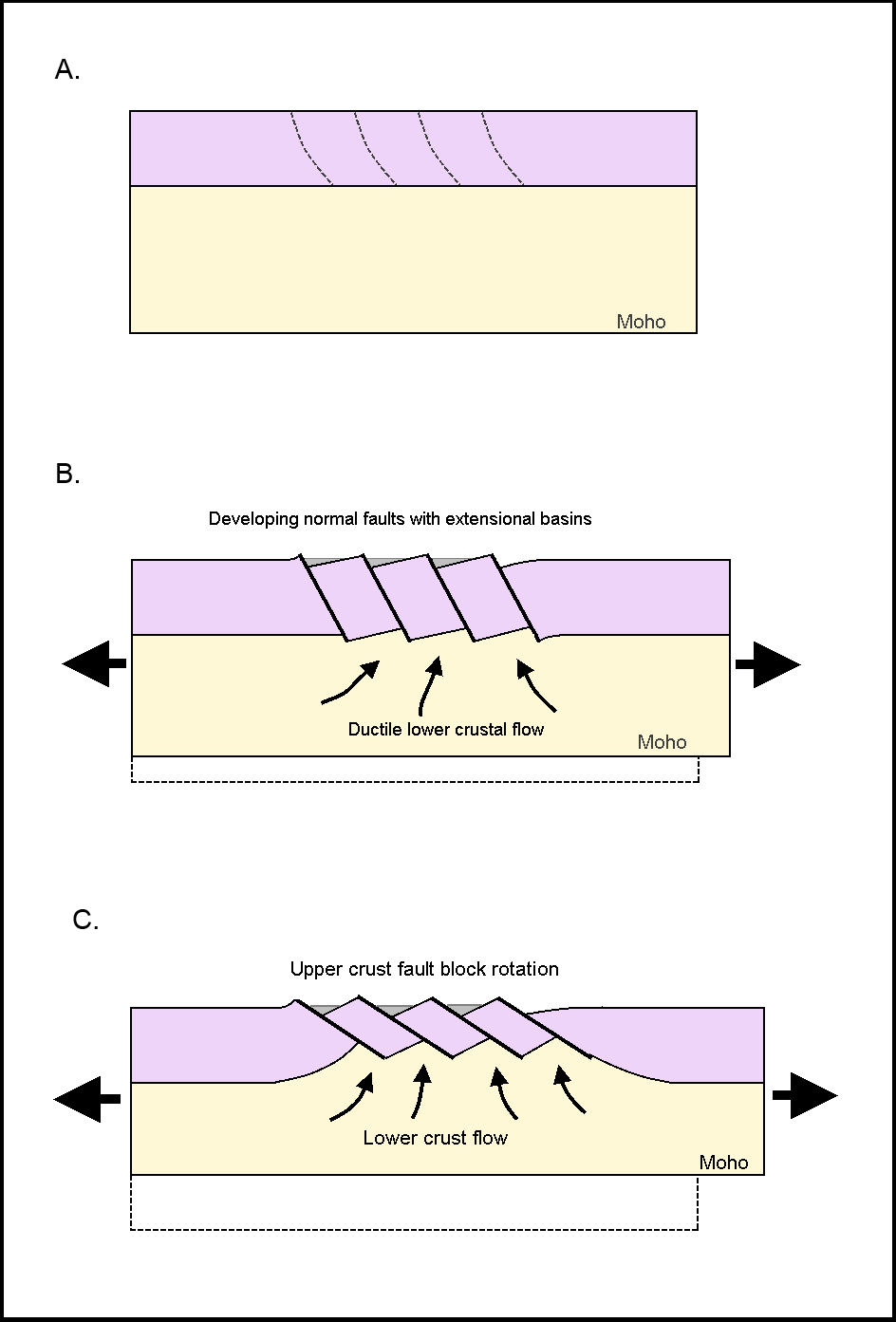
Tilted block development adapted from 2013 Whitney et al., "Continental and oceanic core complexes". The cartoon illustrates how the fault blocks tilt as time progresses in an extensional environment. Time A shows the pre-deformed rock unit. At time B, incipient normal faulting begins. At time C, faulting continues as extension continues. The associated extensional basins begin to fill with eroded material from the exposed blocks.

A time lapse view of the fault block progression.

Tilted block faulting, also called rotational block faulting, is a mode of structural evolution in extensional tectonic events, a result of tectonic plates stretching apart. When the upper lithospheric crust experiences extensional pressures, the brittle crust fractures, creating detachment faults. These normal faults express themselves on a regional scale; upper crust fractures into tilted fault blocks, and ductile lower crust ascends. This results in uplift, cooling, and exhumation of ductilely deformed deeper crust. The large unit of tilted blocks and associated crust can form an integral part of metamorphic core complexes, which are found on both continental and oceanic crust.

== Origin of term ==
The term "tilted block faulting" is a literal description of rotational extension on planar faults, which results in a uniform rotation of faults and crust. Often a "domino-style" stacking of the fault blocks occurs, creating the basis of the terminology.

== Formation ==
=== Faulting, tilting, and exhumation ===
During extensional time periods, large, gently-dipping normal faults, called detachment faults, can form due to relative separation of the two sides surrounding the fault. Typically, these faults can have an offset on the order of one to tens of kilometers. As the region continues to experience extensive pressures, there is an isostatic effect which moves ductile crust material underneath the fault complex. This fault system can shear the footwall, creating domal mountain ranges, which on a large scale can develop into formations known as metamorphic core complexes. If extension at the surface exceeds about 50 percent, decompression melting may permit magmas to form; these will deform the footwall, resulting in a complex associated with intrusive and extrusive igneous rocks. Rocks above the detachment fault form normal faults and, at the same time, shear in a "layer-parallel" motion. This action creates a series of fault blocks, which are progressively tilted as the detachment fault progresses. The fracturing of the fault blocks can occur in a similar time frame or develop progressively.

=== Erosion and basin fill ===
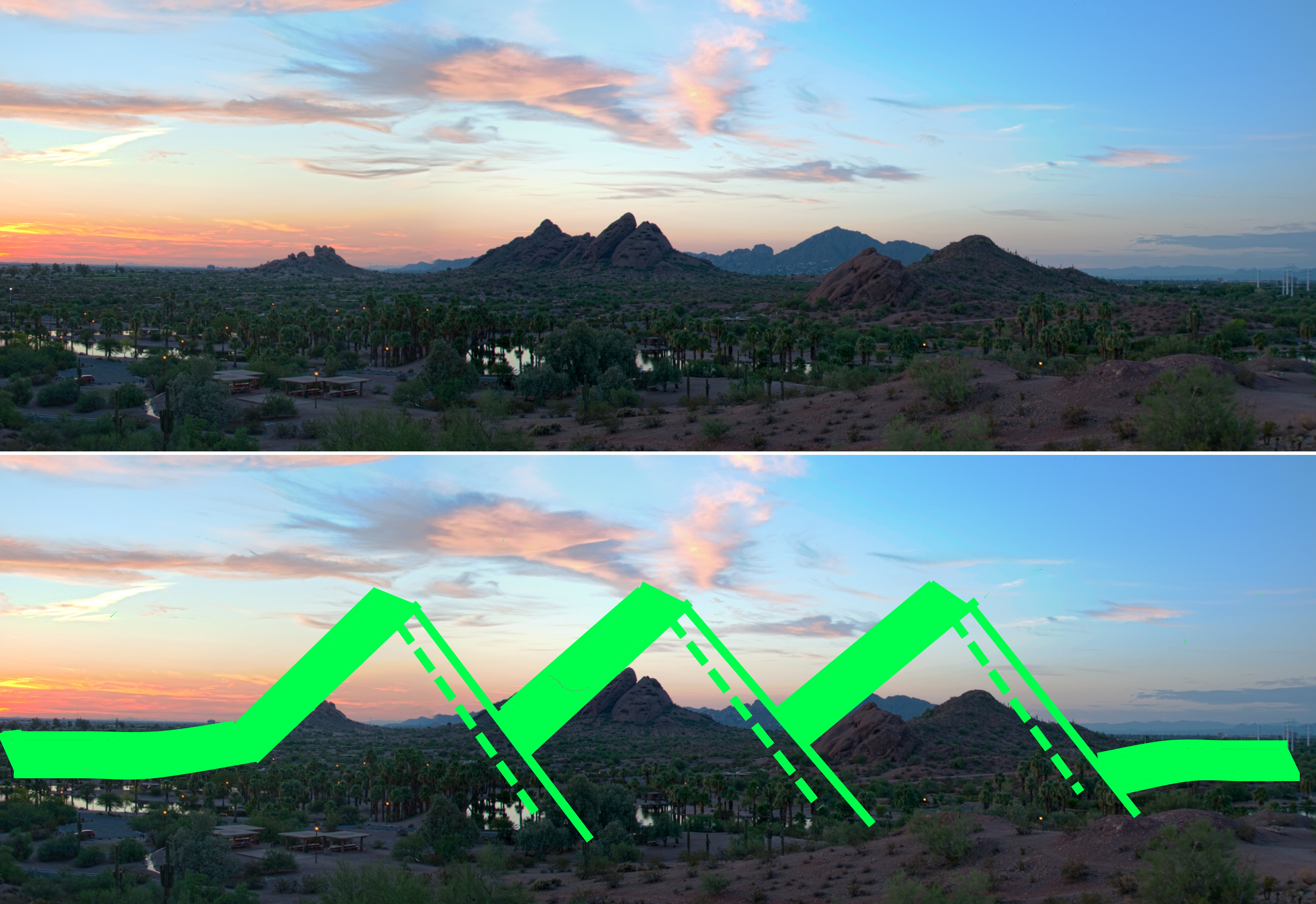
Tilted fault blocks in Tempe, Arizona. Top frame shows the natural expression at the surface, while the bottom frame illustrates the possible pre-erosion three-dimensional formation. The tips of the block erode to fill in the surrounding basin.

As the fault blocks rotate and tip, erosion occurs, filling the basins that are formed with associated sediment from the block into the "down-dropped corners". The basin-fill occurs concurrently with the exhumation. Calculations examining sediment infill suggest that differences in core complexes can be controlled by erosion rates and hanging wall resistance of the fault. Tilted blocks are formed under specific crustal conditions, where the lower crust is relatively warm, not hot. Hotter crust will lead to a type of formation known as a "rolling hinge" complex. The geometry of the tilted block system can be greatly affected by subsidence and isostasy.

== Examples ==
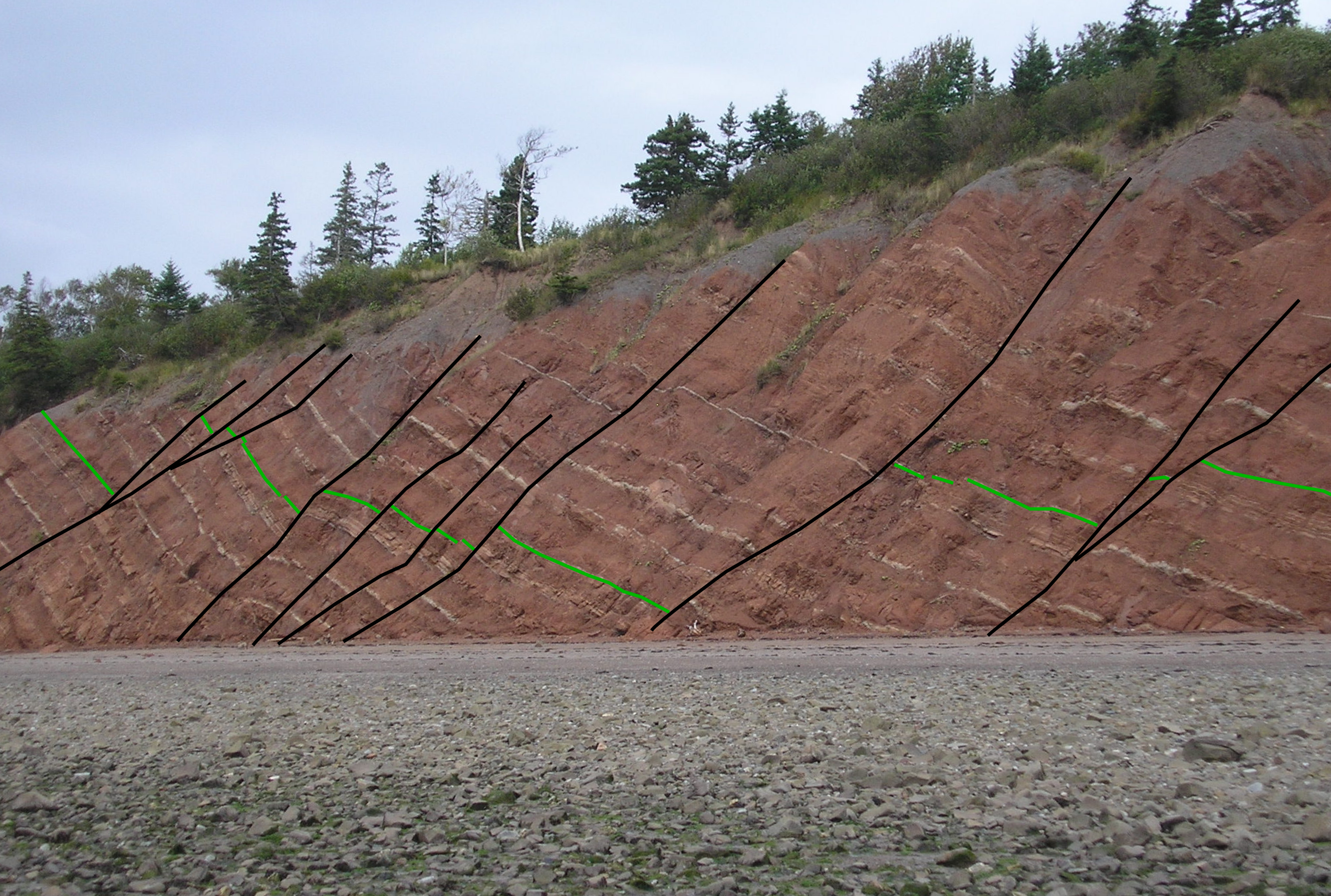
An outcrop view of the extensional faulting that can produce tilting fault blocks. The faults have been highlighted in black, with the green line showing a marker horizon. The photograph is of an extensional fault array on cliffs west of Clarke Head, Minas Basin, North Shore, Nova Scotia.

Core complexes containing rotational fault blocks occur throughout the world. There are excellent examples in the Southwestern United States, including Arizona and Baja California. The more than 25 metamorphic core complexes in this region were formed during crustal extension during the mid-Cenozoic era. Block faulting of this nature is common in extensional settings and has been found to be an important part of physical geological models from sites around the globe, including Europe and China. Due to the availability and applicability of the systems, interest in core complexes and rotational extension systems remains high.

== See also ==
- Half-graben
- Horst and graben
