= National Oil Corporation =

Libyan state-owned oil company

National Oil Corporation المؤسسة الوطنية للنفط
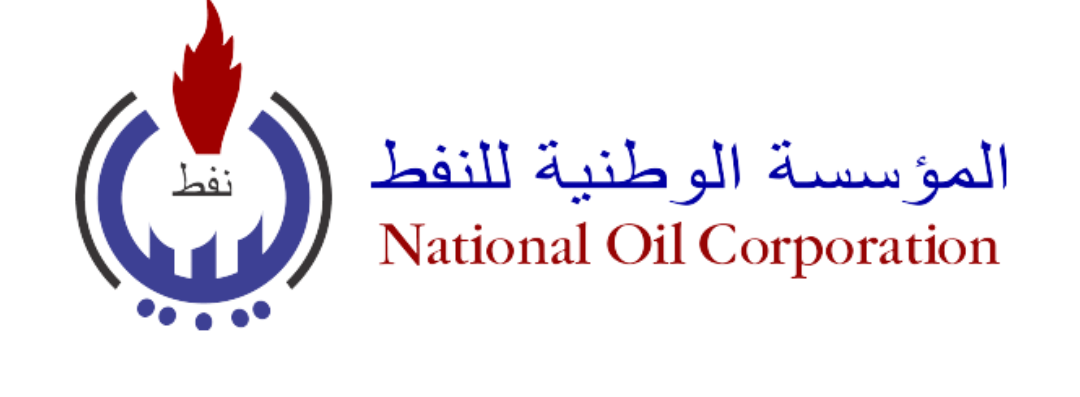
- Company type: State-owned enterprise
- Industry: Oil and gas industry
- Founded: 1970 (in Benghazi)
- Headquarters: Tripoli, Libya
- Key people: Farhat Bengdara, Chairman
- Products: Crude Oil, Natural Gas and Petrochemicals
- Owner: Government of Libya
- Subsidiaries: Zawia Refining; RASCO; Brega; Agoco; Sirte Oil Co. Jowfe Oil Technology; National Drilling Co. North Africa Geophysical Exploration Company; National Oil Fields and Catering Company; Waha Oil Co. Zallaf Libya Oil & Gas
- Website: NOC.ly/index.php/en

The National Oil Corporation (NOC; Arabic: المؤسسة الوطنية للنفط) is the national oil company of Libya. It dominates Libya's oil industry, along with a number of smaller subsidiaries, which combined account for the vast majority of the country's oil output. It is led by Farhat Bengdara, appointed in July 2022. Of NOC's subsidiaries, the largest oil producer is the Waha Oil Company (WOC), followed by the Arabian Gulf Oil Company (Agoco), Zueitina Oil Company (ZOC), and Sirte Oil Company (SOC).

== Libyan oil sector: overview ==
Libya is a member of the Organization of Petroleum Exporting Countries (OPEC) and holds the largest proven oil reserves in Africa (followed by Nigeria and Algeria), 41.5 Gbbl (6.60×10^{9} m^{3}) as of January 2007, up from 39.1 Gbbl (6.22×10^{9} m^{3}) in 2006. About 80% of Libya's proven oil reserves are located in the Sirte Basin Province, which accounts for 90% of the country's oil output. The province ranks 13th among the world's petroleum provinces, having known reserves of 43.1 billion barrels (6.85×10^{9} m^{3}) of oil equivalent (367,00 000,000 bbl (0 m^{3}) of oil, 37.7 trillion cubic feet (1.07×10^{12} m^{3}) of gas, 0.1 Gbbl (16,000,000 m^{3}) of natural gas liquids). The government dominates Libya's economy through control of oil resources, which account for approximately 95% of export earnings, 75% of government receipts, and over 50% of GDP, which was US$50.2 billion in 2006.

== History ==
=== Early years ===
Libya has attracted hydrocarbon exploration since 1956, when the first wildcat oil well was drilled onshore in the Sirte Basin. Libya granted multiple concessions to Esso, Mobil, ENI, Texas Gulf, and others, resulting in major oil discoveries by 1959. In 1969, the Idrissid monarchy was overthrown in a bloodless coup led by Muammar Gaddafi. He eventually elaborated a new theory of the state in which all productive units and workplaces were to be directly governed by popular congresses. As part of his vision, the National Oil Corporation was established on 12 November 1970. The company's first chairman was Salem Mohammed Amesh, who was later replaced by Omar Muntasir. Under its articles of incorporation, NOC was legally restricted to Production sharing agreements (PSA) with international oil companies (IOCs) where the latter assumed all risks associated with exploration. In July 1970, further legislation made NOC responsible for marketing all domestic oil products.

=== Nationalization and the Arab oil embargo ===
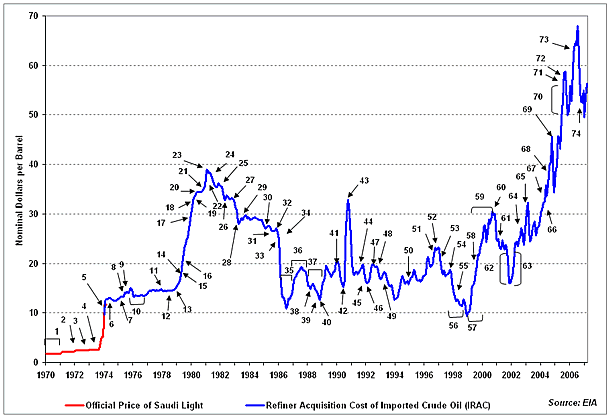
The price of oil during the embargo.

In the 1970s Libya initiated a socialist style nationalization program under which the government either nationalized oil companies or became a participant in their concessions, production and transportation facilities. As part of this program, NOC signed production-sharing agreements with Occidental Petroleum, Sincat (Italy), and formed a joint drilling company with Saipem (an Eni subsidiary). This was accompanied by nationalization of ConocoPhillips's Umm Farud field in 1970, British Petroleum's Sarir field in 1971 and Amoco's Sahabir field in 1976. After commencement of the 1973 Arab-Israeli War, Saudi Arabia, Libya, and other Arab states proclaimed an embargo on oil exports to countries that supported Israel, primarily the United States. Additionally, the NOC had encountered legal actions by BP over claims of ownership. Although the 1973 oil crisis increased global demand, BP's legal position made some countries wary of importing from Libya. NOC compensated for this weakness by arranging barter deals with France and Argentina. On March 18, 1974, the Arab oil ministers ended the US-embargo, with Libya being the sole exception. During 1974, agreements reached with Exxon, Mobil, Elf Aquitaine and Agip provided production-sharing on an 85-15 basis onshore, 81-19 offshore. Eventually, all the foreign companies (excluding BP) agreed to partial nationalization, providing Libya with a substantial oil surplus. However, declining world oil prices resulted in NOC selling back its production shares. Other concessions that were nationalized that year included those belonging to BP, Amoseas (Beida field), Hunt, Arco, Esso and Shell's 17 percent share in the Oasis Oil Company. Mobil-Gelsenberg was owned by the NOC (51%), Mobil (32%), and Gelsenberg (17%). pd.

=== U.S. sanctions ===
The last phase of the socialist period was characterized by an intensive effort to build industrial capacity, but falling world oil prices in the early 1980s dramatically reduced government revenues and caused a serious decline in Libya's advantage in terms of energy costs. More importantly, accusations of terrorism and Libya's growing friendship with the Soviet Union led to increased tensions with the West. On 10 March 1982, the U.S. prohibited imports of Libyan crude oil. Exxon and Mobil left their Libyan operations by January 1983. In March 1984, controls were expanded to prohibit exports to the Ras al-Enf petrochemical complex.

President Ronald Reagan imposed sanctions on 7 January 1986 under the International Emergency Economic Powers Act, prohibiting US companies from any trade or financial dealings with Libya, while freezing Libyan assets in the US. On 30 June 1986, the US Treasury Department forced remaining US oil companies to leave Libya but allowed them to negotiate standstill agreements, retaining ownership for three years while allowing NOC to operate the fields. As a result, Amerada Hess, Conoco, Grace Petroleum, Marathon, and Occidental left a production entitlement that was generating 263,000 bbl/d (41,800 m^{3}/d). Negotiations with NOC and US oil companies over assets dominated much of the late 1980s.

Libya responded by concluding its third Exploration and Production Sharing Arrangements (EPSA-III) in 1988, including agreements with Rompetrol, the Romanian Oil Company, Royal Dutch Shell, Montedison, International Petroleum Corporation of Canada, INA-Naftaplin, OMV, Braspetro and Husky Oil. The agreements included expenditure guarantees by the Libyan government, an important departure from earlier regulations, designed to help offset sanctions.

=== U.N. sanctions and afterward ===
Libya's isolation became even more pronounced following the 1992 imposition of United Nations sanctions designed to force Gaddafi to hand over two suspects indicted for the 1988 bombing of Pan Am Flight 103 over Lockerbie, Scotland. The sanctions, imposed on 31 March 1992, initially banned sales of equipment for refining and transporting oil, but excluded oil production equipment. Sanctions were expanded on 11 November 1993, to include a freeze on Libya's overseas assets, excluding revenue from oil, natural gas, or agricultural products. Under these condition, NOC Chairman Abdallah al-Badri emphasized reducing new projects and upgrading domestic facilities. Joint ventures were initiated with Veba, Petrofina, North African Petroleum, the Petroleum Development Co. (Republic of Korea) and Lasmo. Foreign operators were encouraged to produce exclusively for export, limited to national oil companies with pre-sanctions equity in Libya. This policy was an attempt to contain the amount of crude offered on the spot market through third-party traders, and increase downstream investment. In 2000, NOC was reorganized by the General People's Congress after the Ministry of Energy was abolished, further consolidating control over the sector.

Although U.N. sanctions were suspended in 1999, foreign investment was curtailed due to the U.S. Iran and Libya Sanctions Act (ILSA), which capped the annual amount foreign companies can invest in Libya at $20 million (lowered from $40 million in 2001). On 14 August 2003, Libya agreed to compensate families of the 1988 bombing with $2.7 billion, to be released in three tranches; the first following a lifting of UN sanctions, the second after lifting of US sanctions, and the third after Libya is removed from the U.S. State Department's state sponsors of terrorism list. On 22 December 2003, Libya announced it would abandon WMD programs and comply with the Nuclear Non-Proliferation Treaty. The US welcomed the move, but said it would maintain economic sanctions until it saw evidence of compliance. On 4 June 2004, US Assistant Secretary of Commerce William H. Lash announced that Libya had sent its first shipment of crude oil to the US since resumption of ties between the two countries. In May 2006, the U.S. officially removed Libya from its list of states that sponsor terrorism and normalized ties and removed sanctions.

=== Libyan civil war and transition ===
During the 2011 Libyan civil war, Oil Minister Shukri Ghanem defected and fled to Tunisia. In September 2011, the National Transitional Council named Nuri Berruien as chairman of the NOC during the transitional period. After a period when NOC was split between rival governments in eastern and western Libya, leaders in July 2016 reached an agreement to reunify the company's management. However, on 2 July 2018 they quarreled again.

== Operations ==
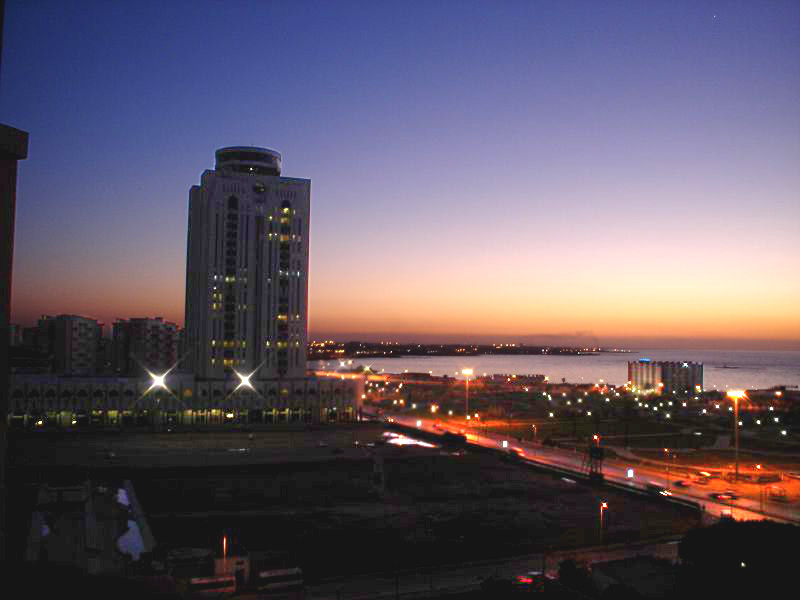
The infrastructure of Libya's capital Tripoli has benefited from the country's oil wealth.

On 30 January 2005, Libya held its first round of oil and natural gas exploration leases since the US ended sanctions: 15 areas were offered for auctions. In October 2005, a second bidding round was held under EPSA IV, with 51 companies taking part and nearly $500 million worth of new investment flowing into the country as a result. In December 2006, Libya held its third bidding round; however, PSAs were still being signed by NOC as of April 2007.

Libya has substantial potential for exploration with an average of 16 wells per 10,000-km, whereas similar countries usually average 50 (the world average is 105).

In November 2016, the group chairman, Mustafa Sanalla, announced the group is seeking to boost output to 900,000 barrels a day by the end of 2016 and about 1.1 million barrels next year.

== Upstream activities ==
Oil and gas E&P is carried out by NOC subsidiaries and IOCs licensed by special participation and PSAs. These activities cover wide areas, both onshore and offshore, through Libya's territorial waters and continental shelf. NOC has a network of onshore oil, gas and product pipelines, crude oil export facilities and a gas pipeline. The Western Libyan Gas Project (WLGP) is a 50-50 joint venture between NOC and Eni, which came online in October 2004. Since then, WLGP has expanded to Italy and beyond. Currently, 280×10^{9} cu ft (7.9×10^{9} m^{3}) per year of natural gas is exported from a processing facility at Melitah, on the Libyan coast, via Greenstream to southeastern Sicily. From Sicily, it flows to the Italian mainland, and then to the rest of Europe. In 2005, additional gas was supplied to the Greenstream pipeline from the Bahr Essalam Field, located in offshore Block NC-41. Development of the Bahr Essalam, Wafa and Bouri Fields, which are part of WLGP, and the natural gas export pipeline represented a shift in Libyan emphasis from oilfield development to a mix of natural gas and oilfield projects. Previously, natural gas exports were limited to LNG.

NOC hopes to increase total oil production from 1.80 mmbd in 2006 to 2 mmbd by 2008. Foreign direct investment into the oil sector is likely, which is attractive due to its low cost of oil recovery, high oil quality, and proximity to European markets.

=== Field development and exploration ===
In November 2005, Repsol YPF discovered a significant oil deposit of light, sweet crude in the Murzuq Basin. Industry experts believe the discovery to be one of the biggest made in Libya for several years. Repsol YPF is joined by a consortium of partners including OMV, Total and Norsk Hydro. Also located in Murzuq Basin is Eni's Elephant field, onshore in Block NC-174. In October 1997, a consortium led by British company Lasmo, along with Eni and a group of five South Korean companies, announced that it had discovered large recoverable crude reserves 750 kilometres (470 mi) south of Tripoli. Lasmo estimated field production would cost around $1 per barrel. Elephant began production in February 2004. Eni (33.3% equity interest) operated the field for joint-venture partners NOC (33.3%), Korea National Oil Co. (16.67%), SK Corp of Korea (8.33%), Majuko Enterprise, Ltd. of Korea (5%), and Daesung Industrial Co. Ltd. of Korea (3.3%). The field was expected to produce 150,000 bbl/d (24,000 m^{3}/d) when fully operational in 2007.

WOCs Waha fields currently produce around 350,000 bbl/d (56,000 m^{3}/d). On 29 December 2005, ConocoPhillips and co-venturers reached an agreement with NOC to return to its oil and natural gas exploration and production operations in Libya and extend the 13-million-acre (53,000 km^{2}) Waha concessions another 25 years. ConocoPhillips operates the Waha fields with a 16.33% share in the project. NOC has the largest share of the Waha concession, and additional partners include Marathon Oil (16.33%) and Amerada Hess.

In October 2013, Libya's oil minister Abdelbari Arusi revealed that the NOC was considering buying Marathon's stake in Waha. In December 2019, NOC stated that it had approved France's Total purchase of stakes in the country's Waha concessions.

== Downstream activities ==
=== Refining ===
NOC owns and operates several refining facilities, in addition to many oil and natural gas processing companies. Close to 380,000 bbl/d (60,000 m^{3}/d) of crude is refined by NOCs subsidiaries. Approximately 60% of refined products are exported, primarily to Europe. These are simple hydroskimming refineries, but their products meet market specifications due to high quality crude. As of early June 2007, NOC was evaluating investment proposals for upgrading its Ra's Lanuf refinery. Total cost of the upgrade is estimated at $2 billion. NOC is also expected to re-tender an engineering, procurement and construction contract for upgrading the Zawia refinery. NOC's refineries include:

Refinery	Capacity	Operator
Zawia Refinery	120,000	ZOC
Ra's Lanuf Refinery	220,000	RLOGPC
Brega Refinery	10,000	SOC
Tobruk Refinery	20,000	Agoco
Sarir Refinery	10,000	Agoco

Notes:
1. Amounts in barrels per day.

=== Petrochemicals ===
The Ra's Lanuf refinery produces petrochemicals, utilizing naphtha as a feed stock to an ethylene plant with a capacity of 1.2 million tpy (tons per year). Its main products are ethylene (330,000 tpy), propylene (170,000 tpy), Mix C4 (130,000 tpy) and P Gasoline (335,000 tpy). NOC also has two polyethylene plants, (HDPE and LLDPE) each with a capacity of 160,000 mt/year. These plants produce various products which are mostly exported. In Brega there is another petrochemical complex using natural gas as a feedstock. In May 2005, Shell agreed to a final deal with NOC to develop Libyan oil and gas resources, including LNG export facilities. The deal came after lengthy negotiations on the terms of a March 2004 framework agreement. Reportedly, Shell is aiming to upgrade and expand Brega and possibly build a new LNG export facility as well at a cost of $105–$450 million. The plants in this complex are:

Plant Type	No.	Capacity
Gas Liquification	1	1,565×10^{12} cu ft/d (44,300 km^{3}/d)
Ammonia	2	733,000
Methanol	2	660,000
Urea	2	916,000

Notes:
1. EIA 2007 (In mt/yr unless stated otherwise)

== Exports ==
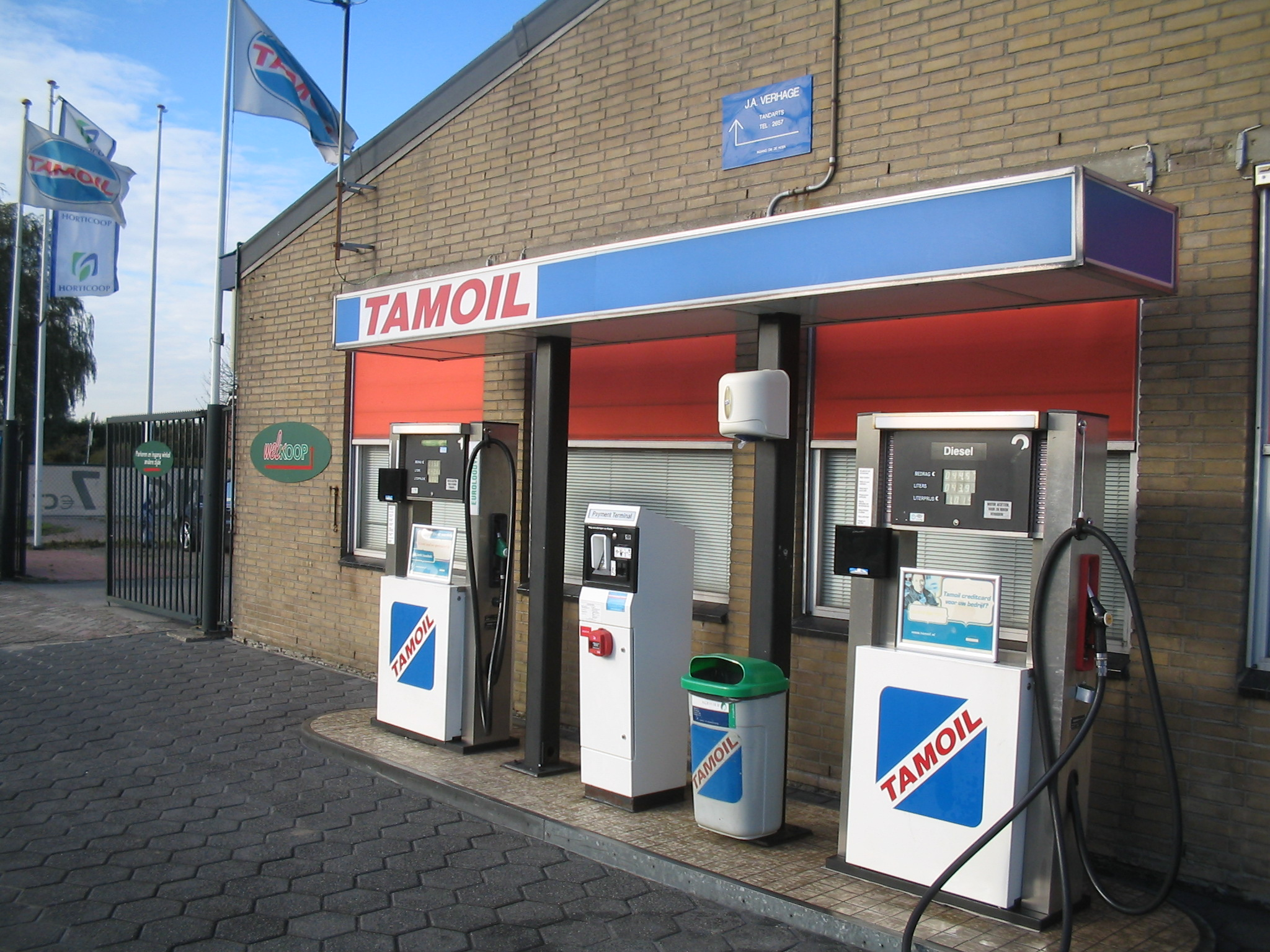
Oilinvest trades under the Tamoil brand in several European and African countries, such as at this filling station in Pijnacker in the Netherlands.

Most of the petroleum products produced by the National Oil Corporation are sold on a term basis, including to the country's overseas oil retail and marketing network Oilinvest, also known as Tamoil. Through Tamoil, Libya is a direct producer and distributor of refined products in Italy, Germany, Switzerland, and Egypt. Tamoil Italia, based in Milan, controls about 7.5% of Italy's retail market for oil products and lubricants, which are distributed through 3,000 Tamoil service stations. Libya's ability to increase the supply of oil products to European markets has been constrained by Libya's refineries' need for substantial upgrading to meet stricter European Union environmental standards in place since 1996. In June 2007, U.S.-based Colony Capital reached an agreement to take over 65% of Tamoil, while the Libyan government will retain 35%. Libya will continue to control Tamoil Africa, which operates retail stations in Egypt and Burkina Faso, as well as other African nations. NOC oil is also sold on a term basis to foreign oil companies like Agip, OMV, Repsol YPF, Tupras, CEPSA, and Total; and small volumes to Asian and South African companies.

With domestic consumption of 284,000 bbl/d (45,200 m^{3}/d) in 2006, Libya had estimated net exports (including all liquids) of 1.525 million bpd. The majority of Libyan oil exports are sold to European countries, such as Italy (495,000 bpd), Germany (253,000 bpd), Spain (113,000 bpd), and France (87,000 bpd). After the lifting of sanctions against Libya in 2004, the United States has gradually increased its importation of Libyan oil; the U.S. imported an average of 85,500 bbl/d (13,590 m^{3}/d) of total Libyan oil exports in 2006, up from 56,000 bbl/d (8,900 m^{3}/d) in 2005. Italy's Edison S.p.A. has committed, under a "take-or-pay" contract, to taking around half (140 Bcf per year) of the natural gas from the WLGP, and to use it mainly for power generation in Italy. Besides Edison, Italy's Energia Gas and Gaz de France committed to taking around 70×10^{9} cu ft (2.0×10^{9} m^{3}) of Libyan natural gas.

== Energy overview ==
Statistic	Amount
Proven oil reserves (2007E)	41.5 b/bbl
Oil production (2006E)	1.8 mmbd (95% crude)
Oil consumption (2006E)	284,000 bbl/d (45,200 m^{3}/d)
Net oil exports (2006E)	1,525 Mbpd
Crude oil distillation capacity (2006E)	378 mbpd
Proven natural gas reserves (2007E)	52.7 tcf
Natural gas production (2006E)	399×10^{9} cu ft (1.13×10^{10} m^{3})
Natural gas consumption (2005E)	206×10^{9} cu ft (5.8×10^{9} m^{3})

Notes:
1. Energy Information Administration (2007)

== See also ==
- Sonatrach
- Joint venture with Yara International and Libyan Investment Authority
- List of Libyan companies
