= Sirte Basin =

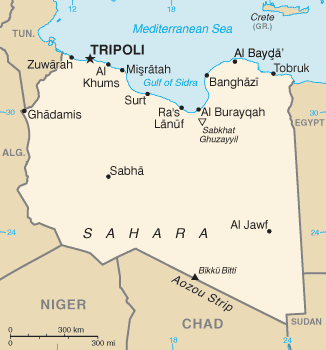
Map of Libya

The Sirte Basin is a late Mesozoic and Cenozoic triple junction continental rift (extensional basin) along northern Africa that was initiated during the late Jurassic Period. It borders a relatively stable Paleozoic craton and cratonic sag basins along its southern margins. The province extends offshore into the Mediterranean Sea, with the northern boundary drawn at the 2,000 meter (m) bathymetric contour. It borders in the north on the Gulf of Sidra and extends south into northern Chad.

== Characteristics ==
The Sirte Basin ranks 13th among the world's petroleum provinces, having proven oil reserves estimated at 43.1 billion barrels (6.85×10^{9} m^{3}) of oil equivalent (36.7 bbl, 37.7×10^{12} cu ft (1,070 km^{3}) of gas, 0.1 bbl (0.016 m^{3}) of NGL), an amount that constitutes 1.7% of the world’s known oil reserves. The basin consists of one dominant total petroleum system, known as the Sirte-Zelten.

The Late Cretaceous Sirte Shale is the primary hydrocarbon source bed. Reservoirs range in rock type and age from fractured Precambrian basement, clastic reservoirs in the Cambrian-Ordovician Gargaf Sandstone, and Lower Cretaceous Nubian Sandstone to Paleocene Zelten Formation and Eocene carbonates usually in the form of bioherms.

Hydrocarbon generation commenced about 50 million years ago (Ma) in the deeper basins, about 40 Ma in many other areas, and may continue to the present day. Geothermal gradients generally range from 1 °F/100 ft to 1.8 °F/100 ft; horsts and grabens generally have roughly equivalent thermal regimes relative to the primary source rock. Along the southwest and west margins of the province are extrusive igneous deposits that tend to diminish the hydrocarbon potential of these areas. The Gialo High is a relatively small horst block in the eastern Sirte Basin. It is most important and primarily known for the stacked oil fields in rocks ranging from the Early Cretaceous to Oligocene age. There are several billion barrels of oil reserves associated with the structure both over the crest of the horst as well as flanking the high in the adjacent graben.

=== Characteristics ===
Statistic	Amount
Formation	Late Mesozoic-Cenozoic
Land area	≈230,000 km^{2}
Source rock	Sirte Shale
Dominant trap style	Structural
Rift Type	Triple junction
System	Tethyan Rift System

Notes:
1. USGS 2002.

== Land area ==
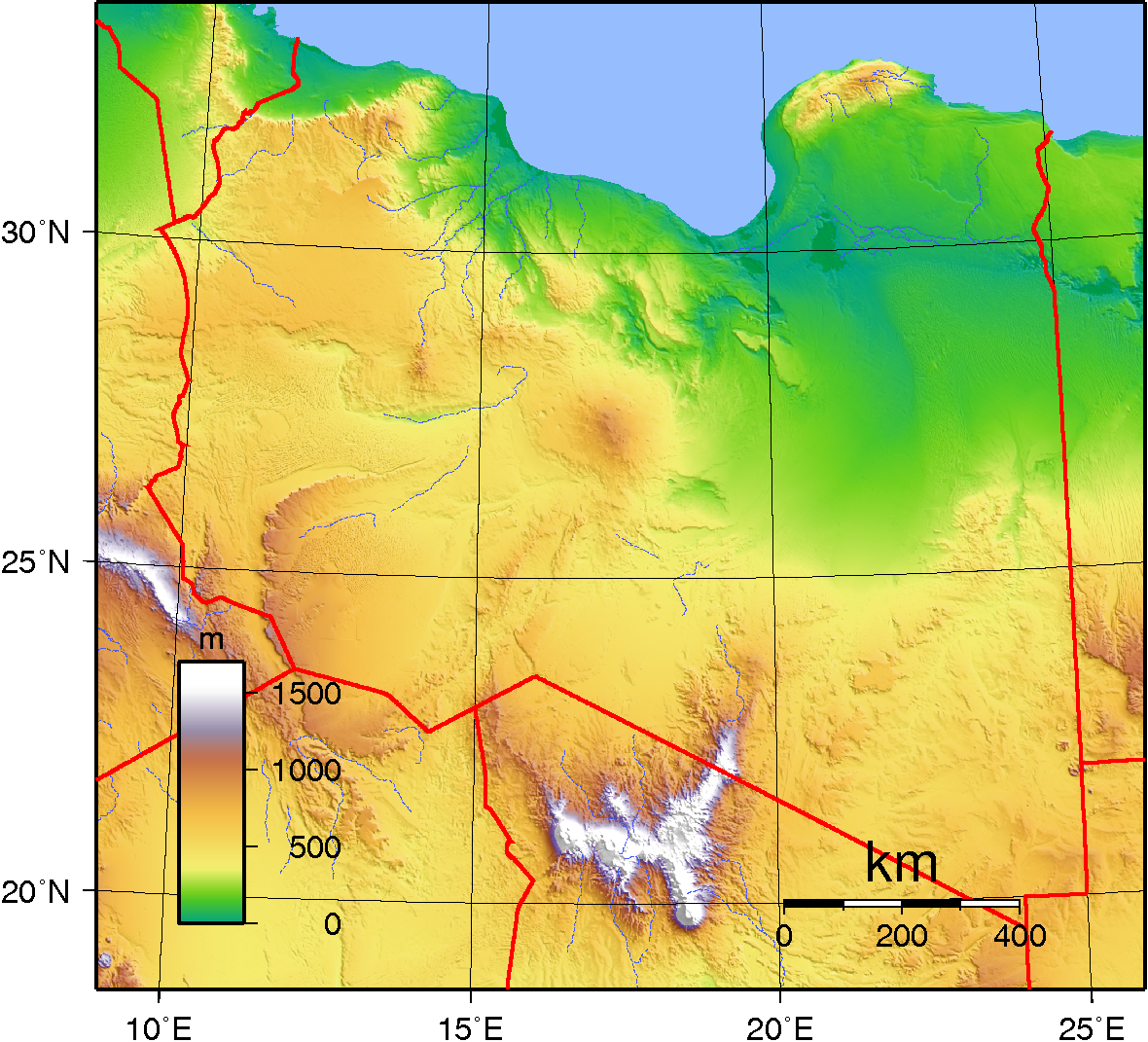
Topography of Libya

The land area in the Sirte basin is characterized by desert steppes and includes eolian deposits from the Rebiana and Kalansho Sand Sea of the Sahara Desert. In a relatively narrow, northern coastal strip, some land areas are as much as 47 m below sea level. The basin is floored by a northwest-southeast-trending mosaic of narrow horsts and grabens, an important structural characteristic that distinguishes it from the adjacent intracratonic Kufra, Murzuk, and Ghadames basins.

The area of the Sirte Basin occupies about 230,000 km^{2}, with a wildcat drilling density of one new field wildcat per 145 km^{2}. Overall drilling density of the basin is 3.3 wells per 100 km^{2}, with an average field depth of 2,100 m. Recent indications of hydrocarbons within grabens suggest that these areas have potential as well as clastic reservoirs beneath the carbonate reservoirs in the Central Sirte Basin. The offshore area beyond 200 m depths is largely unexplored.

== Geologic setting ==
The Sirte Basin province is considered to be a type locality of a continental rift (extensional) area and is referred to as part of the Tethyan rift system. According to the designation scheme of Bally and Snelson, it is classified as 1211; a cratonic basin located on earlier rifted grabens on a rigid lithosphere and not associated with formation of megasutures. Clifford terms it as an interior fracture basin near the tectonic plate margin, which characteristically has an axis at an angle to that margin.

The area's structural weakness is exemplified by alternating periods of uplift and subsidence originating in the Late Precambrian, commencing with the Pan-African orogeny that consolidated a number of proto-continental fragments into an early Gondwanaland. Rifting commenced in the Early Cretaceous, peaked in the Late Cretaceous, and ended in the early Cenozoic, resulting in the triple junction within the basin. The Late Cretaceous rifting event is characterized by formation of a sequence of northwest-trending horsts and grabens that step progressively downward to the east; the Sirte Trough represents the deepest portion of the basin. These horsts and grabens extend from onshore areas northward into a complex offshore terrane that includes the Ionian Sea abyssal plain to the northeast. This plain is underlain by oceanic crust that is being subducted to the north and east beneath the Hellenic arc. The Pelagian province to the west, particularly the pull-apart basins of the Sabratah Basin and extending along the South Cyrenaica Fault Zone (SCFZ) and the Cyrenaica Platform to the east, is strongly influenced by extensional dextral strike-slip faulting. To the south, the Nubian Swell is the stable continental basement for this rifted basin.

== Trap style ==
In geology, "trap" refers to the stratigraphic or tectonic structural feature that ensures the juxtaposition of reservoir and seal such that hydrocarbons remain trapped in the subsurface, rather than escaping (due to their natural buoyancy). Oil and gas trapped within the porous rock unit migrate to a high point in the structure because of their low density. In the Sirte Basin the dominant trap style is structural (84 percent), with the remainder considered stratigraphic or a combination of the two. As examples of combined traps, bioherm developments in the Paleocene Zelten Group are found on horst blocks, and clastic stratigraphic traps such as at Sarir or Messla field are superimposed on structures.

== Petroleum history ==
The first reported petroleum occurrence in the Sirte Basin was observed in a coastal water well drilled by Italian colonists during the Italian-occupation. The Italian government embarked on geologic investigations of the area and produced a geological map in 1934. Shows of natural gas were observed in the late 1930s, but World War II interrupted exploration efforts. Competitive bidding for concessions was subsequently permitted by two mineral laws passed in 1953 and 1955, and exploration by Esso, Mobil, Texas Gulf, and others commenced with seismic, magnetic, and gravity data being collected. From 1956 to 1961 giant oil fields were discovered. Libya started exporting oil in 1961 and by 1966 it was the 7th largest oil-producing nation in the world. During 1969, output from the Sirte Basin had even exceeded production from Saudi Arabia (3 Mmbpd). Libya nationalized its oil industry in 1973, and some American oil companies began withdrawing in 1982, following a 1981 US trade embargo. By 1986, the US government ordered remaining US companies to cease activities in Libya. In 1992, the United Nations sanctioned Libya in response to the 1988 bombing of Pan Am Flight 103. Additional sanctions applied by the US Sanctions Act of 1996 were relaxed in 1999. Since then, American and other foreign oil companies have returned to resume their operations in Libya, led by Agip (Italy), OMV(Austria), Veba (Germany), Total (France), Nimir (Saudi Arabia), WOC (National Oil Corporation, Conoco, Marathon, Amerada Hess), and ETAP of Tunisia. In 2020, operations were transferred by Wintershall Aktiengesellschaft to Sarir Oil Operations. In August 2021, state-owned company NOC announced plans for resuming operations in the basin.

== Petroleum occurrence ==
In 2007, the Energy Information Administration estimated that the Sirte Basin Province contains approximately 80% of Libya's total proven oil reserves (41.5 billion barrels (6.60×10^{9} m^{3}) as of January 2007) and accounted for roughly 90% of the country's total oil output, which was 1.80 Mbbl/d (286,000 m^{3}/d) in 2006. Over twenty-three large oil fields and sixteen giant oil fields occur in the province. Libya's onshore oil has historically been discovered mainly within the confines of three major geological trends occurring in the Sirte Basin:

1. Western fairway
2. North-central Libya
3. Easterly trend

=== Basin petroleum data: selected fields ===
Field	Geological Trend	Annual Production	Reserves	Discovery	Operator(s)
Samah Field	Western	NA	Gof	NA	(Libya) WOC
Beida Field	Western	NA	Gof	NA	(Libya) NOC
Dahra-Hofra Field	Western	NA	Gof	NA	(Libya) WOC
Raguba Field	Western	NA	Gof	1961	(Libya) SOC
Bahi Field	Western	NA	NA	1958	(Libya) NOC
Waha Field	Northcentral	350,000 bbl/d (56,000 m^{3}/d)	Gof	1961	(United States) ConocoPhillips
Nasser Field	Northcentral	NA	2.5 Bbbl	1956	(Libya) SOC
Hateiba gas field	Northcentral	NA	NA	1960	(Libya) SOC
Sarir Field	Eastern	NA	12.0 Bbbl	1961	(Libya) Agoco
Messla Field	Eastern	NA	Gof	1971	(Libya) Agoco
Gialo Field	Eastern	NA	Gof	NA	(Libya) WOC
Bu Attifel Field	Eastern	80,000 bbl/d (13,000 m^{3}/d)	Gof	1968	(Italy) Agip
Intisar Field	Eastern	NA	Gof	1967	(Libya) ZOC
Nafoora-Augila Field	Eastern	100,000 bbl/d (16,000 m^{3}/d)	Gof	1965	(Libya) Agoco
Amal Field	Eastern		Gof	1959	(Libya) Harouge
En-Naga Field	Western	24,000 bbl/d (3,800 m^{3}/d)	Gof	1998	(Libya) Harouge

Notes:
1. USGS 2002 (Bbbl = "billion barrels of oil"). 2. LOF = large oil fields (>100 million barrels of oil equivalent): GOF = giant oil fields (>500 million barrels of oil equivalent).

The Amal Field produces from the Cambro-Ordovician Amal Formation and the Early Cretaceous Maragh Formation at a depth of 10,000 feet (3,000 m). The Sarir Field produces from a Cretaceous Sandstone in an anticline with fault blocks discovered from a seismic survey. The Messla Field produces from the Lower Cretaceous fluvial Sarir sandstone 27 m thick at a depth of 2682 m. The Intisar 'D' Oil Field produces from an upper Paleocene pinnacle reef 385 m thick, 5 km in diameter, and at a depth of about 2700 m

Due to the debts of companies in the sector, oil production dropped by 300,000 barrels per day in Libya, falling to less than 1 million b/d in April 2021 from 1.3 million the month before.
