= Julio Alonso Ortega =

Spanish sailor

Julio Alonso
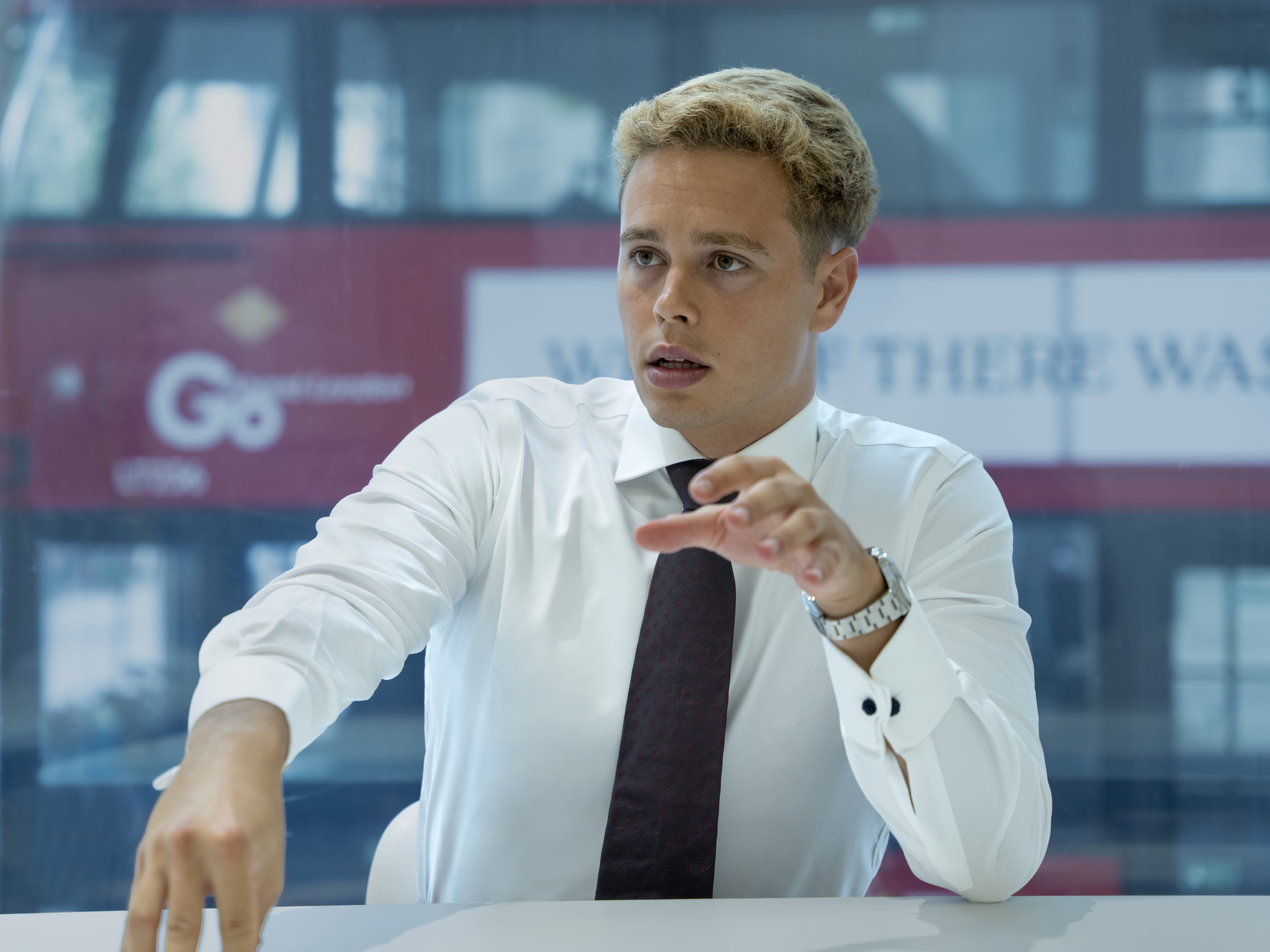
- Julio Alonso at a meeting in 2025

Personal information
- Born: Julio Alonso Ortega; 23 December 2000 (age 25) Las Palmas, Gran Canaria
- Occupation: Sailor
- Height: 188 cm (6 ft 2 in)
- Weight: 75 kg (165 lb)

Signature
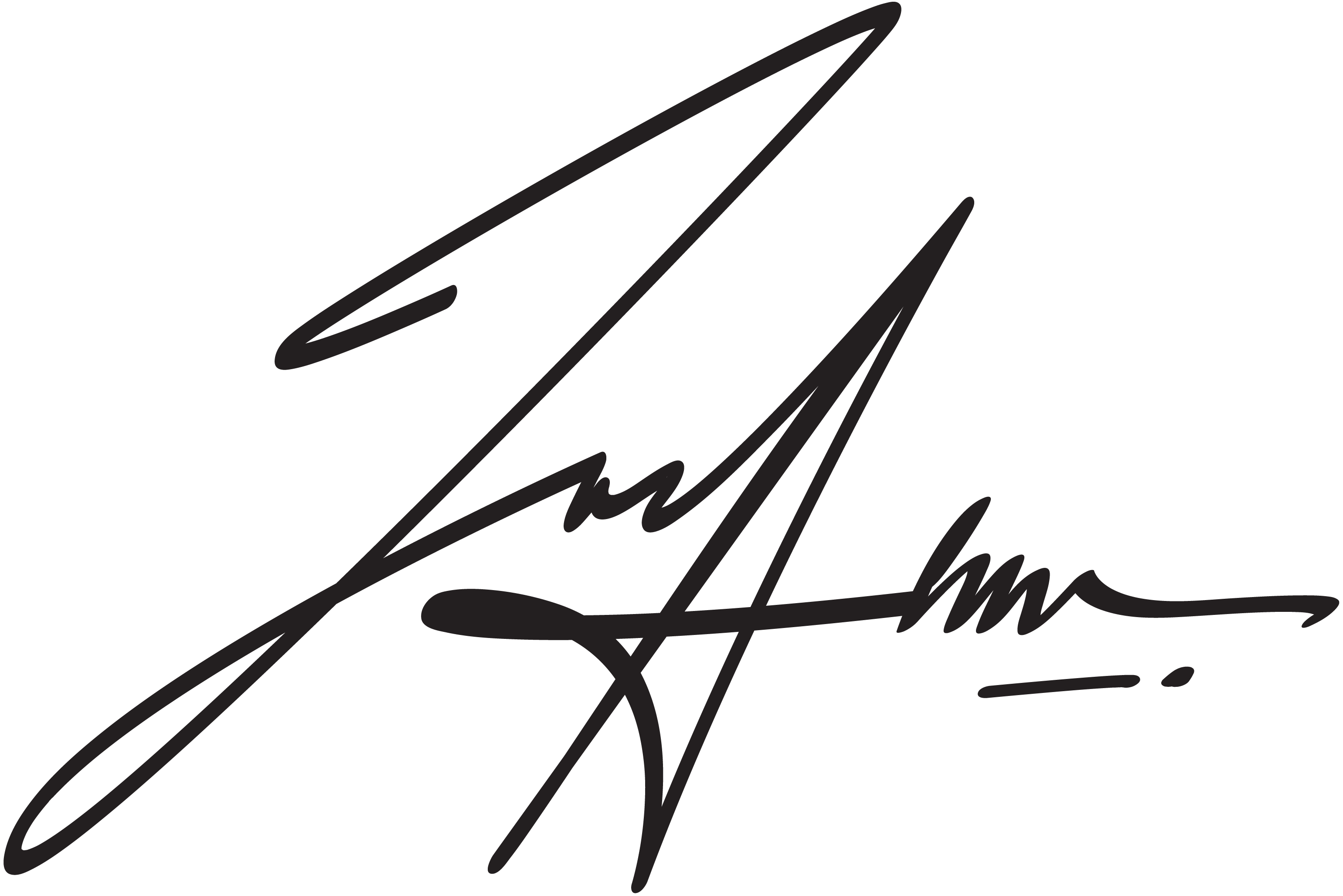

Sport

Sailing career
- Class: Dinghy
- Club: Royal Gran Canaria Yacht Club
- Coach: Aarón Sarmiento; Luis Doreste

Julio Alonso Ortega (born 23 December 2000 in Las Palmas, Gran Canaria) is a Spanish sailor and world champion specialising in two-person dinghy class. He has sailed throughout most of his sporting career for the Royal Gran Canaria Yacht Club, where he trains under coaches Aarón Sarmiento, and two-time Olympic gold medallist Luis Doreste.

== Education ==
Outside of his sailing career, Alonso pursued higher education in the United Kingdom. He graduated with a Bachelor of Science in Business Management, achieving First-Class Honours, from Lancaster University. He later completed a Master's in the Political Economy of Emerging Markets at King's College London, and a second Master's degree in International Business from the Universidad del Atlántico Medio, supported by a scholarship from PROEXCA.

== Sailing career ==
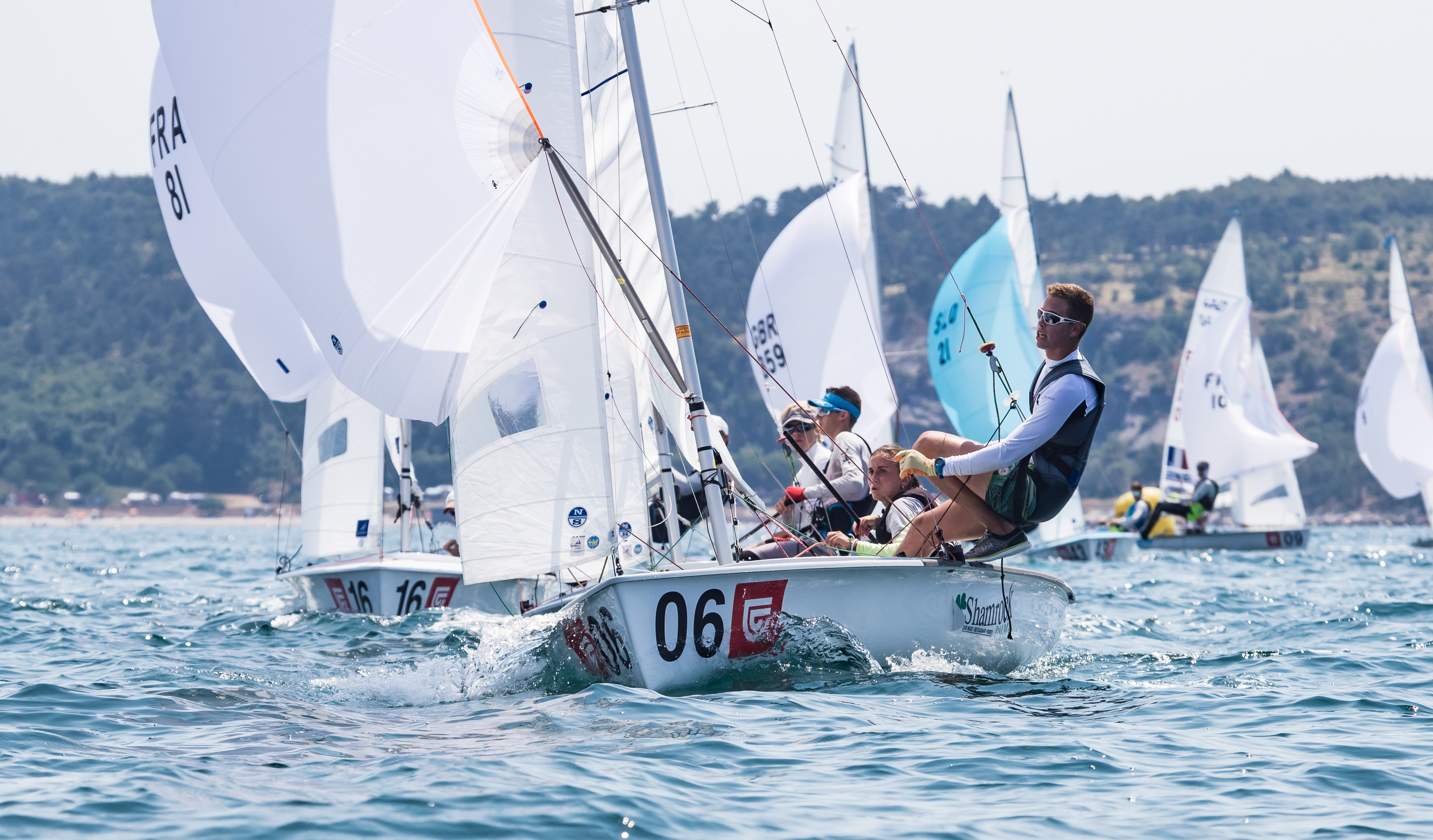
Alonso–Bover team racing at the 2019 Under-24 470 Worlds.

Alonso began sailing at the age of ten in the Optimist class at Mogán, later joining the Royal Gran Canaria Yacht Club, where he continues to compete.

In the 420 class, Alonso achieved significant success. He won three Spanish Sailing Championships and secured a runner-up position alongside Luis Doreste, son of the esteemed sailor Luis Doreste and nephew of Manuel Doreste, Gustavo Doreste, and José Luis Doreste—all prominent figures in Spanish sailing history. During this period, he also participated in various European and World Championships, gaining valuable international experience.

A highlight of his time in the 420 class was winning a World Championship in the team racing category. This achievement led to significant recognition in his hometown, where he performed the honorary kick-off at a football match between UD Las Palmas and Real Madrid CF at Estadio Gran Canaria.

Transitioning to the 29er class, Alonso secured a gold medal at the Absolute Spanish 29er Championship, and an under-19 gold medal at the Spanish Championship. These successes qualified him to represent Spain at the 2018 Youth Sailing World Championship held in Corpus Christi, Texas, where he finished tenth overall.

In the same year, Alonso signed with Spanish Impulse by IBEROSTAR, a team officially formed to represent Spain in the Red Bull Youth America's Cup held in Bermuda. During this period, he also represented Spain at the Red Bull Foiling Generation World Final in Miami, competing in Flying Phantom catamarans and showcasing his adaptability across high-performance sailing disciplines.

Currently, Alonso partners with María Bover with the objective of representing Spain in the mixed 470 class at the Olympic Games. To date, they have achieved a fourth-place finish in the under-24 category at the 470 Sailing World Championship, and a fifth-place finish in the under-24 category at the 470 Sailing European Championship.

== Professional career ==
Alonso's endeavours beyond sport have mainly been centred in North Africa.

In 2024 he joined the consulting firm Qabas, becoming a partner the following year. His remit has largely encompassed the energy, finance, and natural-resources sectors, including oversight of projects such as migrating regional banks' cross-border-payment messaging and reporting to the SWIFT ISO 20022 standard.

During the same period, he helped establish The Law Society of Libya, where he has since served as a senior adviser.

From 2025, he also provided regular commentary on economic and investment matters to regional media outlets, among them the newspapers Al-Wafd, Al Gomhuria, and The Egyptian Gazette.
