= Mining industry of Libya =

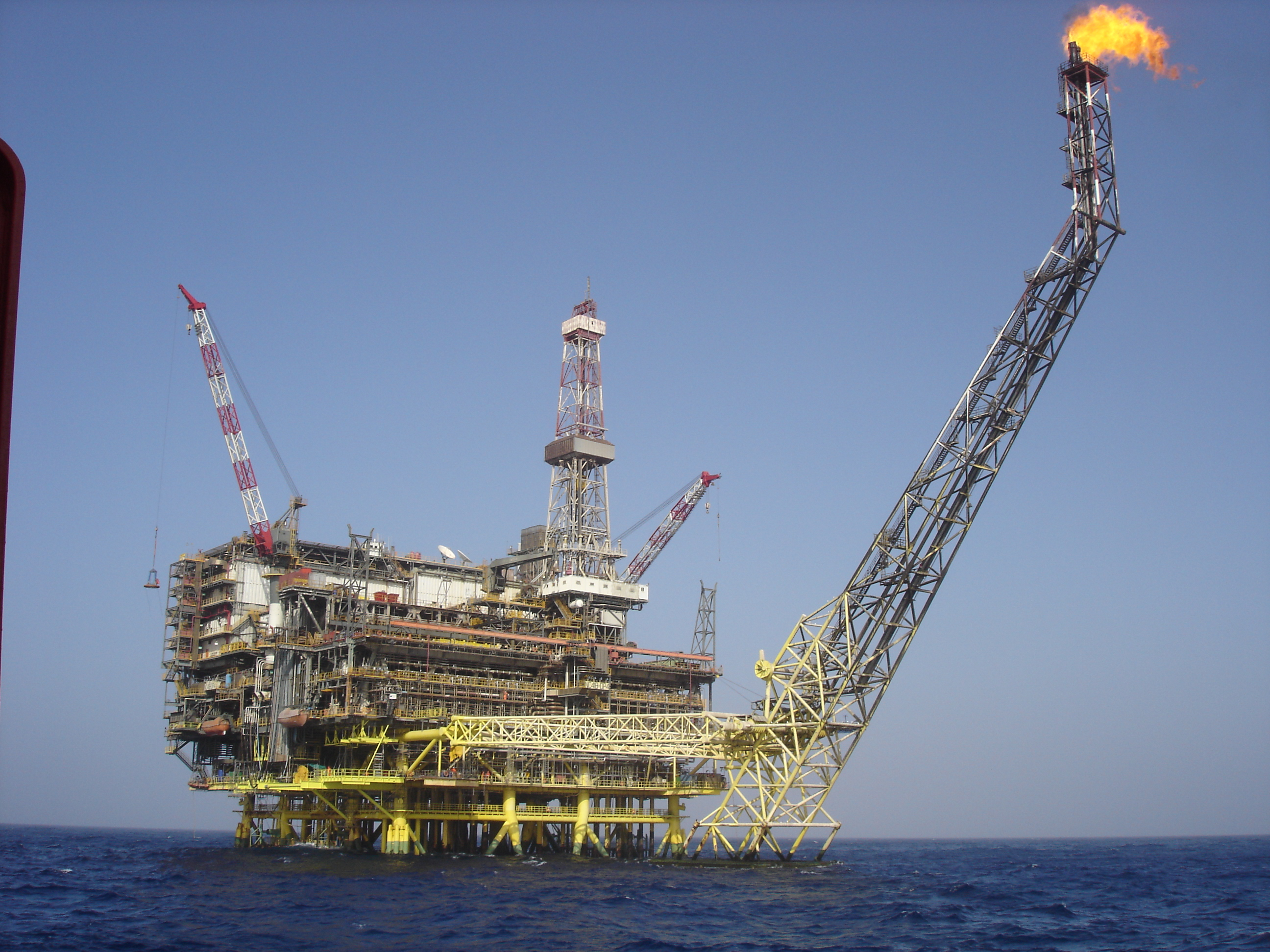
Bouri Offshore Field

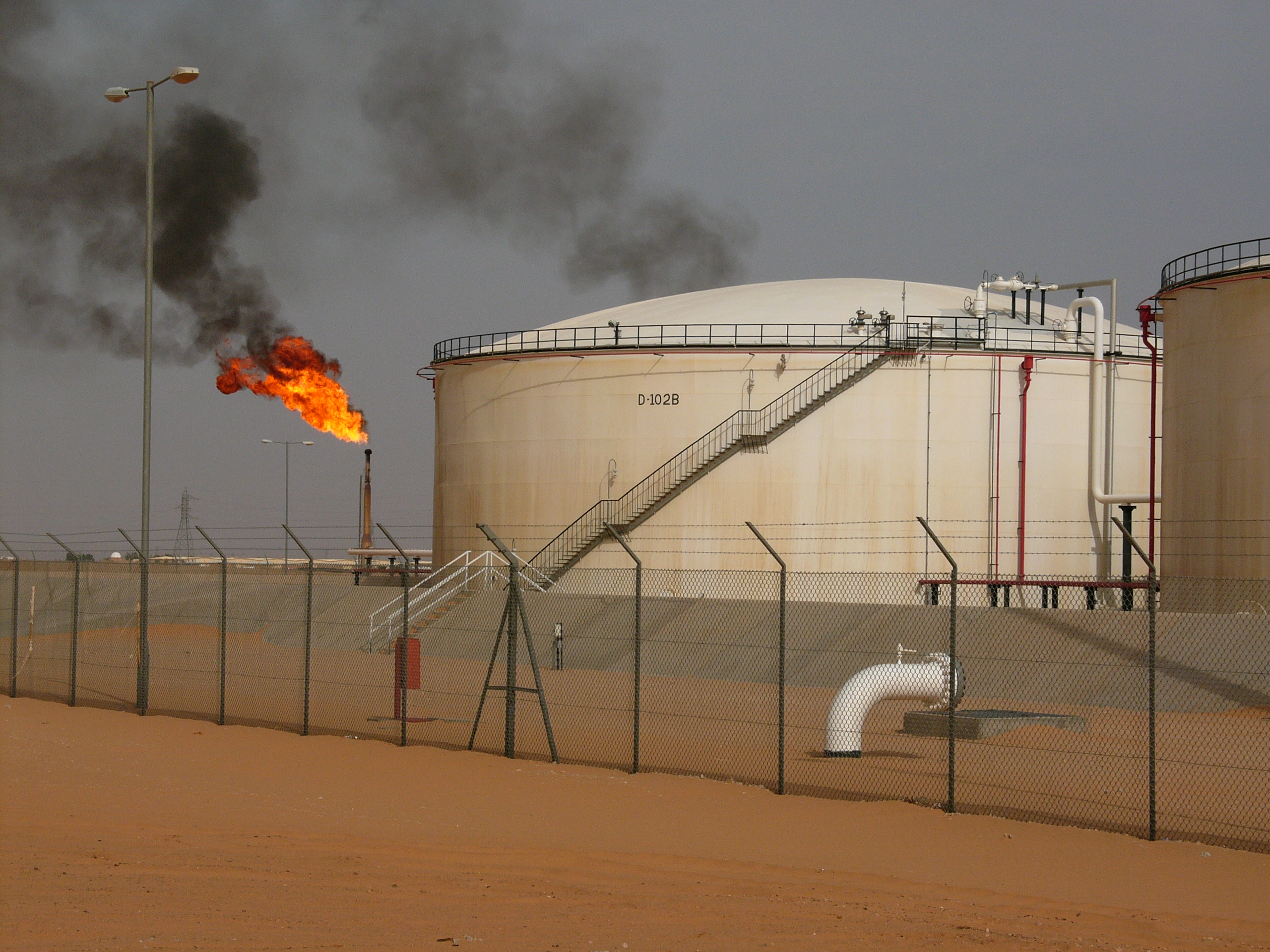
El Sharara oil field, operated by Repsol.

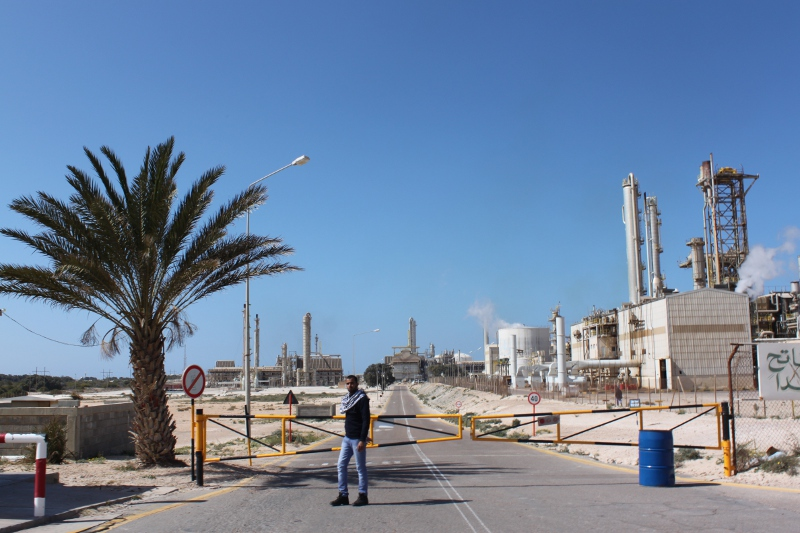
Brega oil complex

Libyan oil fields and pipelines (2011)

The mining industry of Libya does not contribute significantly to its economy. Mining resources are located in remote regions with limited accessibility. The fuel sector, including oil reserves (which have a capacity of 29.5 billion barrels) and natural gas (which has 1.31 trillion cubic meters of reserve) is the major revenue-generating industry.

The Wadi ash-Shati' may hold one of the world's biggest iron ore deposits.

== Production and impact ==
The identified sources of minerals relate to diamondiferous kimberlites in the East Saharan craton and metamorphic belts with potential for gold in the southern region of the country. Large gypsum deposits have produced 150,000 tons per year for the manufacture of cement. Other sources include sulfur extraction (about 13,000 tons/year) as a byproduct of refining petroleum and natural gas. Iron ore from Wadi ash-Shati', approximately 900 kilometres (560 mi) from the sea, is also of note, with a reserve identified of 795 million tons of 52% grade. This has not been extracted due to the remoteness of its location.

Substantial reserves of magnesium and potassium salts have been recorded, but apart from magnetite, phosphate rock, and sulfur, these are yet to be mined. There are large salt flats in the north; production in the 1980s amounted to 11,000 tons of salt per annum. Oil fields include the Bouri Field, the Mediterranean's largest producing oilfield; El Sharara, Elephant, Raguba, Sarir, Waha, and Zelten.

== Legal framework ==
The enabling laws for mining and oil sector are in place. These are: Law 5 on Encouragement of Foreign Capital Investment Law of 1426 (1997) and Law 25 of the Petroleum Law of 1955.

== Commodities ==
Petroleum products are the major industry in Libya, with mineral extraction being limited, and not making up a significant portion of the country's economy. The mining of raw materials is limited mainly to industrial minerals such as clay, cement, salt and limestone. Libya's output in 2000 included 270,000 tons of lime and 175,000 tons of gypsum. Other mineral reserves consist of potash in the Sirte Desert, magnetite, phosphate rock, and sulfur.

== See also ==
- Energy in Libya
- Libyan oil industry
- National Oil Corporation
- Oil reserves in Libya
