= Doreste =

Doreste is a surname. Notable people with the surname include:

- Gustavo Doreste (born 1960), Spanish sailor
- Gustavo Martínez Doreste (born 1975), Spanish sailor
- José Luis Doreste (born 1956), Spanish sailor
- Luís Doreste (born 1961), Spanish sailor
- Manuel Doreste (1958–2026), Spanish sailor
