= Oil reserves in Libya =

Oil reserves located in Libya

Libyan oil fields, pipelines, refineries and storage facilities

Libya holds the largest proved oil reserves in Africa and ranks among the top ten countries globally. At the beginning of 2024, the country had 48 billion barrels of proved oil reserves, representing 41% of Africa's total. Libya produces mostly light, sweet crude oil, but production has been repeatedly disrupted by political conflict and infrastructure constraints. Most of the country remain underexplored.

Libya exported an estimated 1 million barrels per day of crude oil and condensate in 2023. Europe accounted for about 78% of these exports, with Italy, Germany and Spain among the main destinations.

Cumulative production through 2009 was 27 Gbbl. Given the stated number, this would be 65% of reserves.

The drilling of oil wells in Libya was first authorised by the Petroleum Law of 1955. The National Oil Corporation is the largest oil company of Libya.

== Features ==
Libya is considered a very attractive oil country due to its low oil production cost (around $1 per barrel for some wells), and its proximity to European markets. Libya wants to increase its production from 1.8 Mbbl/d (290 × 10 3 m 3 /d ) in 2006 to 3 Mbbl/d (480 × 10 3 m 3 / d) in 2010-13, but with current oil fields showing production declining by 7-8%, Libya's challenge is to maintain production from mature fields, while finding and developing new oil fields. Most of Libya's territory remains unexplored due to past sanctions and disagreements with foreign oil companies.

Prior to 2011, foreign companies exploiting Libyan oil were the National Oil Corporation (National Oil Company of Libya), Italy's ENI, Total, ConocoPhillips, Repsol -YPF, CNPC, Neft and Tatneft.

In 2017, the leading companies exploiting Libyan oil are: ENI, Total and Schlumberger and, since this year, the Russian oil company Rosneft. Indeed, the Libyan national oil company (NOC) has signed a cooperation agreement with the Russian company for investments in the hydrocarbons sector.

In February 2018, the French company Total announces the acquisition for an amount of 450 million dollars, of the Libyan company Marathon Oil Libya Limited. The latter holds a 16.33% stake in the Waha 4,5 concessions.

== History ==
The drilling of oil wells in Libya was authorized by the Petroleum Law of 1955.

Cumulative production in 2009 was 27 Gbbl 7. This would represent 65% of the reserves.

In 2010, 3/4 of all Libyan oil exports went to only 5 countries: Italy (28%), France (15%), China (11%), Germany (10%), and Spain (10%). The net revenue from the sale of crude oil were estimated at $50 billion with the country then producing over 1.6 million barrels per day.

The fall of Gaddafi in 2011 plunged the country into economic turmoil, and between 2014 and 2016, production had only recovered to 30% of its former production at less than 500,000 barrels per day.

At the time, the president of the National Oil Company, Moustafa Sanalla, was pleased to announce for the 2017 financial year, that revenues had reached $14 billion on production of 1.25 million barrels per day which, while three times more than 2016 levels, still only represented 75% of the production from the Gaddafi years. 9.

A surge in state-sanctioned fuel trafficking between 2022 and 2024 cost Libya approximately $20 billion in lost revenue.

== See also ==
- Energy in Libya
- Libyan oil industry
- Mining industry of Libya
- National Oil Corporation
