= Geology of Libya =

The geology of Libya formed on top of deep and poorly understood Precambrian igneous and metamorphic crystalline basement rock. Most of the country is intra-craton basins, filled with thick layers of sediment. The region experienced long-running subsidence and terrestrial sedimentation during the Paleozoic, followed by phases of volcanism and intense folding in some areas, and widespread flooding in the Mesozoic and Cenozoic due to a long marine transgression. Libya has the largest hydrocarbon reserves in Africa, as well as deposits of evaporites.

== Stratigraphy, tectonics and geologic history ==
Libya is underlain by Precambrian igneous and metamorphic basement rock, which only outcrops at a few locations. These ancient rocks include schist, gneiss, quartzite and granite, known from boreholes.

=== Paleozoic (539-251 million years ago) ===
An angular unconformity separates the overlying Hassaouna sandstones from lower Precambrian rocks. These sandstones are inferred to be Cambrian rocks, formed at the beginning of the Paleozoic. In some cases, purple and blue Murizidie series rocks intercalate the sandstones. Orogeny related sedimentation continued through the Ordovician, until a period of tectonic calm in the Silurian. Early Devonian rocks appear to be missing from Libyan stratigraphy. Devonian rocks begin with the Tadrari coarse sandstones, which formed during a period of land subsidence that continued into the Early Carboniferous.

Active subsidence continued to drive sedimentation in the Jeffara plain during the Late Carboniferous and Permian Along the eastern edge of the Kufra Basin, near Jebel Oweinat, the Paleozoic ended with volcanism, which intruded early Paleozoic ring dikes.

=== Mesozoic (251-66 million years ago) ===
The pattern of subsidence and continental sedimentation from the Paleozoic continued into the Mesozoic, mainly in the Triassic, but also extending into the Jurassic. In fact, in the Murzuk Basin and Kufra Basin, the pattern continued into the Early Cretaceous, at which point the existing basins stabilized. However, renewed subsidence continued in the east, running parallel with the development of the Libyan tilt.

A marine transgression flooded the region in the Aptian and the Albian, reaching what is now Sirte by the Cenomanian and eastern Fezzan by the Maastrichtian.

thumb

=== Cenozoic (66 million years ago-present) ===
In the Cenozoic, the marine transgression continued, extending to the Tibesti area by the Early Eocene. The subsidence remained irregular, creating different blocks of rock. This process became more complicated, as fault troughs formed in the Oligocene due to tectonic stretching of the African block and continued into Miocene, Pliocene and Quaternary. The current boundaries of the Gulf of Sirte are the result of Pliocene and Quaternary flexures in the rock. The depression by the Ionian Sea is particularly recent, east of the stable Pelagian block.

Northern Cyrenaica is different from the rest of the country and is more closely related to the central Tunisian platforms. The zone uplifted in the Eocene and intensely deformed during the Middle Miocene. It still has some seismically active faults. Areas that had experienced volcanism in the Paleozoic, such as Jebel Oweinat, experienced renewed eruptions in the recent geologic past, along with Tibesti-Garian axis. ,

== Hydrogeology ==
Much of Libya is underlain by consolidated sedimentary rock aquifers with intergranular flow. Cyrenaica, in the northeast has consolidated fractured sedimentary units. Zones in south, central and northwest Libya have some groundwater housed in igneous rock and unconsolidated sedimentary deposits predominate along the western coast, eastern border with Egypt and in the southwest.

== Natural resource geology ==
Libya has the largest hydrocarbon reserves of any country in Africa, and these resources play a major role in the economy of Libya. The country also has phosphate, gypsum, magnetite, potash, salt and sulfur reserves.
