= Julio Alonso =

The name Julio Alonso may refer to:

- Julio Alonso Sosa (born 14 December 1998), Spanish professional footballer.
- Julio Alonso Ortega (born 23 December 2000), Spanish sailor and world champion.
