= Qabas =

Libyan consulting firm

Coordinates: 32°53′35″N 13°10′58″E

Qabas Consulting & Training
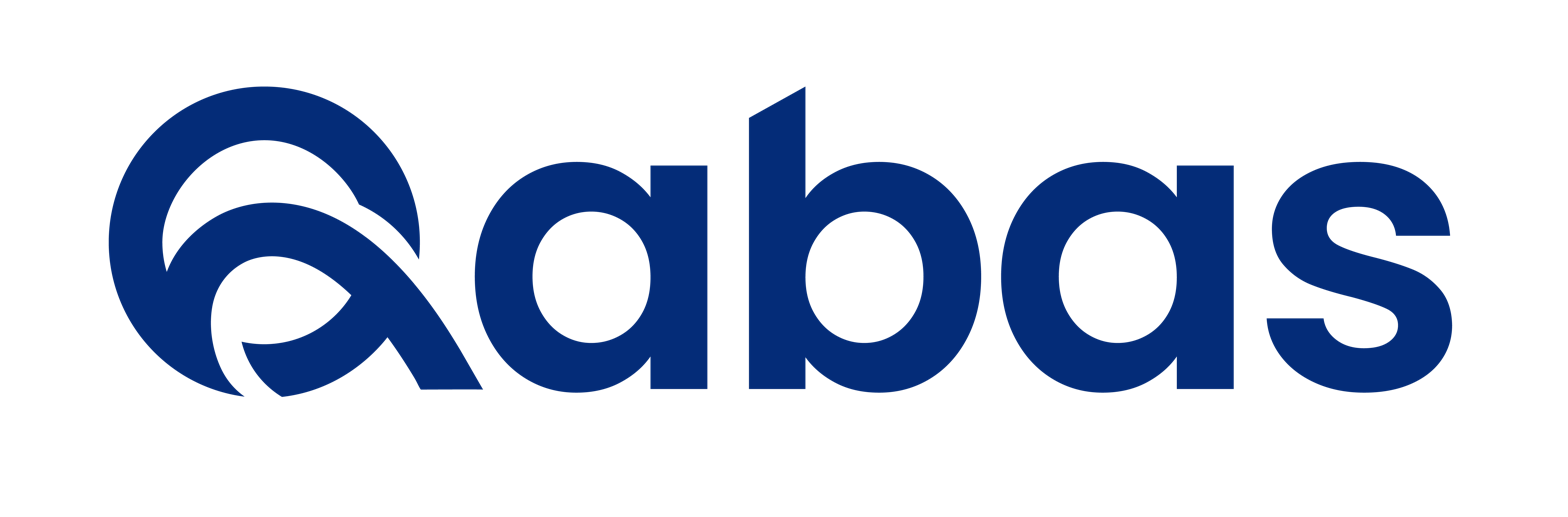
- Formerly: Qabas Scientific for Consultancy and Training
- Industry: Consulting; Professional services
- Founded: 1994; 32 years ago
- Headquarters: Tripoli, Libya
- Area served: EMEA
- Products: Professional services
- Number of employees: 200+
- Website: www.qbs.ly

Qabas Consulting & Training, formerly Qabas Scientific for Consultancy and Training, is a Libyan consulting firm headquartered in Tripoli, Libya. Founded in 1994, it advises public- and private-sector clients on operations, risk, strategy, and training, and is regarded as the largest consulting practice in Libya. The firm serves clients across Europe, Middle East and Africa (EMEA) region, with a particular focus on North Africa, and employs more than 200 people.

== History ==
=== Early years ===
In the aftermath of United Nations Security Council Resolution 748 of 1992, which prompted most foreign consultancies to withdraw from Libya, Qabas Scientific for Consultancy and Training (Arabic: القبس العلمية للاستشارات والتدريب) was founded in 1994 to address the acute shortage of technical expertise in the country's oil and gas sector. During its early years, the firm concentrated on advisory services and capacity-building for the National Oil Corporation (NOC; Arabic: المؤسسة الوطنية للنفط), and its subsidiaries.

=== International expansion ===
During the early 2000s the firm extended its operations beyond Libya. In Algeria it advised Sonatrach (Arabic: سوناطراك; French: Société nationale pour la recherche, la production, le transport, la transformation et la commercialisation des hydrocarbures) on capacity building and quality-management systems. It then entered the Nigerian market through NAOC, a subsidiary of its Libyan client Agip, assisting with the implementation of international operating standards. Subsequent projects across North Africa and The Sahel Region expanded its regional presence.

=== Diversification amidst national turbulence ===
The First Libyan Civil War (15 February – 23 October 2011) severely disrupted the national economy, prompting Qabas to further diversify its focus beyond hydrocarbons. Between 2011 and 2019 the firm deepened its advisory expertise in aviation, construction, finance, healthcare, intellectual property, media, technology, and telecommunications, while also strengthening its specialist units in actuarial services, digital transformation, regulatory compliance, risk management and corporate restructuring.

=== Recent developments ===
In the 2020s Qabas formalised regional partnerships with several Fortune Global 500 companies, including Oracle Corporation, an American multinational computer technology company headquartered in Austin, Texas; Amazon Web Services (AWS), a subsidiary of Amazon that provides on-demand cloud computing platforms and APIs to individuals, companies, and governments, on a pay-as-you-go basis; and Microsoft, an American technology conglomerate headquartered in Redmond, Washington.

In 2025 it launched the "It Should Be Libyan" campaign, aimed at increasing local participation in the national oil and gas sector and supporting Libya's target of producing two million barrels of oil per day. The campaign reportedly generated more than 25 million online impressions.
