= Law of Libya =

Flag of Libya

The law of Libya has historically been influenced by Ottoman, French, Italian, and Egyptian sources. Under the Great Socialist People's Libyan Arab Jamahiriya, Libya has moved towards a legal system based on sharia, but with various deviations from it. In recent times, Libyan law has become more authoritarian as civil liberties have become subject to scrutiny by law.

== Ottoman and Italian law ==
When Libya was ruled by the Ottoman Empire, the civil law was the Majallat al-ah Kam al-ad Liyat. In 1830, the Ottoman Empire adopted the Napoleonic Code as its commercial code. However, Islamic law continued to influence other areas, for example, the 1858 Ottoman Land Code, which comprised a mix of Turkish traditional practises and Islamic law. By 1870, the Senussi movement of Sufi- and Salafi-influenced jurist Muhammad ibn Ali as-Senussi had also effectively established an alternative legal system, more purely based on Islamic law, for the tribes of inland Libya. The coastal portion of Libya was also administered as an Italian colony from 1911 to 1943, bringing Italian law into Libya as well.

== Law under the federal monarchy ==
In the 1950s under King Idris, completely new codes based on French and Italian civil law were drafted, including the Commercial Code of 1953 and the Civil Code of 1954. The latter was written by Abd El-Razzak El-Sanhuri, the author of the 1948 Egyptian Civil Code, which itself was based on the French civil law, but also recognised sharia and Arab customs as a source of law. Arab customs were ranked by Article I of the Libyan code as third as a source of law in Libya, behind sharia; this compares to its ranking of second, ahead of sharia, in other countries adopting Sanhuri codes such as Egypt and Iraq. European laws were imported and applied in fields where sharia law was less developed, namely commercial law, procedural law, and penal law. Islamic influence remained in some areas of commercial law too, however; Libya was the first country adopting the Sanhuri code to prohibit riba (usury).

Libya maintained a dual system of courts during this period: sharia law, of the Maliki school, was applied by sharia courts in matters of personal status. However, the establishment of this system of dual courts in practice meant power was taken away from the traditional sharia courts, leading to a backlash and the growth of Islamic opposition movements.

== Post-revolutionary law ==
When Muammar Gaddafi came to power in the Libyan Revolution, he promised to reinstate sharia law and abrogate imported laws that contradicted Islamic values. Initially, however, Article 34 of the 1969 constitution stated that all old laws remained in effect, except for those which contravened the new constitution. In 1973, Gaddafi suspended all legislation, and stated that sharia would be the law of the land; however, Gaddafi's sharia was based only on the Quran and not on a classical Muslim legalistic source of fiqh. It could hence be considered a new form of fiqh. The dual-court system was also abolished that year, replaced by a single court system which aimed to bring together Islamic and secular principles. However, by 1974, progress in the Islamicisation of the law had come to a halt.

The Green Book, Gaddafi's outline of his political and economic philosophy for Libya, officially accepts religion and customary law as sources of law for society. In 1977, the Libyan government promulgated the Declaration of People's Power, which superseded the constitution; this also stated that the Qur'an was the source of legislation for Libya. However, throughout the late 1970s and 1980s, Gaddafi repeatedly emphasised in speeches that Islamic law was an insufficient basis for modern economic and social relations, and that the traditional Islamic guidelines for property and commerce had no legal standing. In practise, secular policies overrode religion as a source of law. Thus, by 1990, Ann Elizabeth Mayer of the University of Pennsylvania described Gaddafi's actual progress towards the Islamisation of Libyan law as "very modest", and largely aimed not at reviving specific sharia rules, but enforcing public morality consistent with Libyan values.

One area in particular in which Libyan laws are inconsistent with sharia is in the penal law, where the punishments are lighter than those mandated by traditional hudud, especially in the case of needy offenders. Mayer analyses this as leniency inspired by the Libyan government's socialist principles. The Libyan government also viewed Sharia's protection of private property, along with principles of Islamic law regarding contracts and commerce, as incompatible with a socialist economic programme. However, Libyan law follows the sharia rules of evidence; the testimony of women and non-Muslims is not accepted in criminal matters. The Maliki school continued to be used as the source of Islamic law; however, if Maliki sources do not cover a certain question, reference is made to the Libyan Penal Code and the Libyan Code of Penal Procedure, rather than other schools of sharia law. The practical aim of this procedure seems to have been to limit the number and scope of Sharia laws applied.

== Law Post-Gaddafi Era ==
Despite efforts to repeal laws imposed during the Gaddafi era, the current Libyan government retains many of Gaddafi's authoritarian policies. Examples of these are maintaining the death penalty and the use of an amended version of Article 195, a Gaddafi-era law used to clamp down on free speech. Libya lacks many civil liberties. Freedom of the press is limited as Law No. 5 of 2022 gave authorities the ability to censor and arrest journalists on grounds of public order and morality. Libya has maintained policies from its 1953 penal code under the new government. These laws include Article 207, which allows for the criminalization of any activities regarded as aiming to change the structures of social systems. The law in practice has been used to threaten activists and converts to death. Overall, Libya, as of 2025, lacks a variety of civil rights commonly found across developed nations and is highly authoritarian.

== See also ==
- Petroleum Law of 1955
- Copyright Law of 1968 on Wikisource
- Constitution of Libya (1951)
- Constitution of Libya (1969)
- Libyan interim Constitutional Declaration
- The Law Society of Libya

== Sources ==
- Ahmida, Ali Abdullatif (2009), The making of modern Libya: state formation, colonization, and resistance, SUNY Press, ISBN 978-1-4384-2891-8
- Bechor, Guy (2007), The Sanhūrī Code, and the emergence of modern Arab civil law (1932 to 1949), Brill, ISBN 978-90-04-15878-8
- Haddad, Yvonne Yazbeck; Stowasser, Barbara Freyer (2004), Islamic law and the challenges of modernity, Rowman Altamira, ISBN 978-0-7591-0671-0
- Mayer, Ann Elizabeth (1990), "Reinstating Islamic Criminal Law in Libya", in Dwyer, Daisy Hilse (ed.), Law and Islam in the Middle East, Greenwood Publishing Group, pp. 99–115, ISBN 978-0-89789-151-6
- Otman, Waniss A.; Karlberg, Erling (2007), "The Libyan Legal System and Key Recent Legislation", The Libyan Economy: economic diversification and international repositioning, Springer, pp. 63–86, ISBN 978-3-540-46460-0
- Thomas, Abdulkader S. (2006), Interest in Islamic economics: understanding riba, Routledge, ISBN 978-0-415-34242-1
- Vandewalle, Dirk J. (2006), A history of modern Libya, Cambridge University Press, ISBN 978-0-521-85048-3
