= List of power stations in Libya =

This article lists all power stations in Libya.

== Fossil fuel ==
=== Combined cycle gas turbine ===
Plant	Community	Coordinates	Capacity (MW)	Year completed	References
El-Feel Field			100	2010	
Western Mountain	Al Garbi		600	2005-2006	
Zelten Field				1968	
Zwitina			500	2010	

=== Oil ===
Plant	Community	Coordinates	Capacity (MW)	Year completed	References
Jakhira				2003	

=== Dual fuel (natural gas & oil) ===
Plant	Community	Coordinates	Capacity (MW)	Year completed	References
Benghazi North			300	1994-2004	
Zawia			1440	2003-2008	

== Renewable ==
=== Solar ===
Plant	Community	Coordinates	Type	Capacity (MW)	Year completed	References
	Kufra		Photovoltaic	100		

== See also ==
- Energy in Libya
- List of power stations in Africa
- Renewable energy in Africa
- Energy in Africa
