= Economy of Libya =

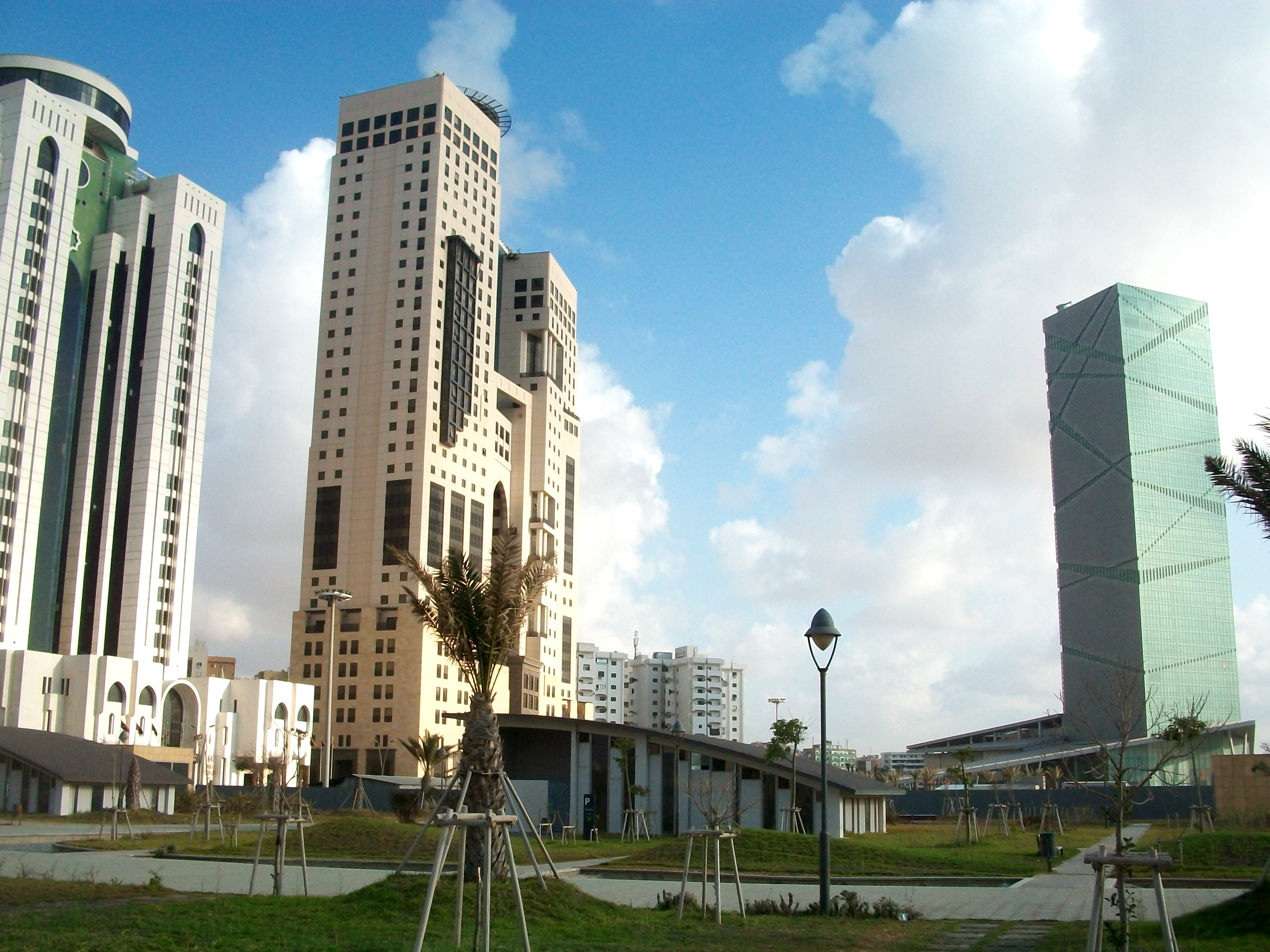
- Tripoli, financial capital of Libya
- Currency: Libyan dinar (LYD, ل.د)
- Fiscal year: calendar year
- Trade organisations: OPEC, COMESA, CEN-SAD, AMU
- Country group: Developing/Emerging; Upper-middle income economy

Statistics
- Population: ▲7,417,134 (2024)
- GDP: ▲$47.94 billion (nominal; 2025); ▲$123.99 billion (PPP; 2025)
- GDP rank: 95th (nominal; 2025); 95th (PPP; 2025)
- GDP growth: ▲17.3% (2025); ▲4.3% (2026f)
- GDP per capita: ▲$6,800 (nominal; 2025); ▲$17,760 (PPP; 2025)
- GDP per capita rank: 102nd (nominal; 2025); 101st (PPP; 2025)
- GDP per capita growth: 0.9% (2024)
- GDP by sector: agriculture 1.3%; industry 52.3%; services 46.4%; (2017 est.)
- Inflation (CPI): 2% (2024)
- Population below national poverty line: NA%
- Gini coefficient: N/A
- Human Development Index: ▲0.718 high (2022)
- Labour force: ▲2,534,196 (2023); 38.7% employment rate (2012)
- Labour force by occupation: agriculture: 17%; industry: 23%; services: 59%; (2004)
- Unemployment: ▼18.74% (2023 est.)
- Youth unemployment: ▼50.1% (2025)
- Main industries: petroleum, steel, iron, food processing, textiles, cement

External
- Exports: ▼$30.59 billion (2024)
- Export goods: crude oil, refined petroleum products, natural gas, chemicals
- Main export partners: EU 75%; Italy 24.6%; Germany 15.1%; Greece 8.57%; Spain 8.32%; France 7.46%; United Kingdom 9.11%; United States 4.88%; China 3.8%; Thailand 1.97%; Turkey 1.82% (2024)
- Imports: ▼$20.92 billion (2024)
- Import goods: machinery, transport equipment, semi-finished goods, food, consumer products
- Main import partners: EU 36.2%; Italy 11.6%; Greece 5.67%; Cyprus 4.07%; Germany 3.07%; Belgium 2.62%; China 17.1%; Turkey 13.4%; Egypt 9.31%; Tunisia 3.77%; India 3.14% (2024)
- FDI stock: ▲$92.427 billion (2023 est.); ▼ Abroad: $20.97 billion (31 December 2017 est.)
- Current account: ▲$5.675 billion (2021 est.)
- Gross external debt: ▼$3.02 billion (31 December 2017 est.)

Public finance
- Government debt: ▼4.7% of GDP (2017 est.)
- Foreign reserves: ▲$74.71 billion (31 December 2017 est.)
- Budget balance: −25.1% (of GDP) (2017 est.)
- Revenue: 28.005 billion (2019 est.)
- Spending: 37.475 billion (2019 est.)
- Economic aid: recipient ODA $9 million (2010), $642 million (2011), $87 million (2012)
- All values, unless otherwise stated, are in US dollars.

Libya has a developing economy. It depends primarily on revenues from the petroleum sector, which represents over 95% of export earnings and 60% of GDP. These oil revenues and a small population have given Libya one of the highest nominal per capita GDP in Africa.

After 2000, Libya recorded favorable growth rates with an estimated 10.6% growth of GDP in 2010. This development was interrupted by the Libyan Civil War, which resulted in contraction of the economy by 62.1% in 2011. After the war, the economy rebounded by 104.5% in 2012. It crashed again following the Second Libyan Civil War. As of 2024, Libya's per capita PPP GDP stands at only 65% of its pre-war level in 2010.

== Macroeconomic trends ==
Libyan GDP per capita was about $40 in the early 1920s and it rose to $1,018 by 1967. In 1947 alone, per capita GDP rose by 42 percent.

The following table shows the main economic indicators in 1980–2021 (with IMF staff estimates in 2022–2027). Inflation below 5% is in green. The annual unemployment rate is extracted from the World Bank, although the International Monetary Fund find them unreliable.

Year	GDP (in Bil. US$PPP)	GDP per capita (in US$ PPP)	GDP (in Bil. US$nominal)	GDP per capita (in US$ nominal)	GDP growth (real)	Inflation rate (in Percent)	Unemployment (in Percent)	Government debt (in % of GDP)
1980	97.8	32,745.5	40.2	13,449.6	▲0.6%	▲14.3%	n/a	n/a
1981	▼85.6	▼27,398.5	▼34.7	▼11,107.6	▼-20.0%	▲13.2%	n/a	n/a
1982	▲92.3	▲28,202.7	▼34.6	▼10,575.6	▲1.5%	▲13.8%	n/a	n/a
1983	▼91.4	▼26,800.2	▼33.0	▼9,671.5	▼-4.7%	▲10.5%	n/a	n/a
1984	▼86.8	▼24,406.1	▼30.9	▼8,681.2	▼-8.3%	▲12.4%	n/a	n/a
1985	▲90.1	▲25,471.4	▼30.4	▼8,586.4	▲0.6%	▲9.1%	n/a	n/a
1986	▼81.5	▼22,172.1	▼24.8	▼6,734.0	▼-11.4%	▲3.4%	n/a	n/a
1987	▼71.2	▼18,585.1	▼23.0	▼6,002.1	▼-14.7%	▲4.4%	n/a	n/a
1988	▲79.3	▼18,346.5	▲25.9	▼5,981.6	▲7.6%	▲3.1%	n/a	n/a
1989	▲88.4	▲19,550.0	▲27.4	▲6,070.1	▲7.2%	▲4.5%	n/a	n/a
1990	▲95.1	▲22,327.7	▲31.6	▲7,424.2	▲3.7%	▲0.7%	n/a	4.7%
1991	▲116.3	▲26,685.3	▲35.0	▲8,026.3	▲18.3%	▲11.7%	19.8%	▲9.6%
1992	▼113.6	▼25,468.7	▲35.5	▼7,950.5	▼-4.5%	▲9.5%	▲20.0%	▼1.2%
1993	▼109.9	▼24,106.1	▼31.9	▼6,998.3	▼-5.5%	▲7.5%	20.0%	▼-4.6%
1994	▲115.9	▲24,921.7	▼29.7	▼6,391.1	▲3.2%	▲10.7%	▼19.9%	▲-1.6%
1995	▼100.1	▼21,064.9	▲33.7	▲7,102.9	▼-15.4%	▲8.3%	▲20.0%	▲4.8%
1996	▲103.7	▲21,422.2	▲36.8	▲7,608.8	▲1.8%	▲4.0%	▼19.8%	▲12.2%
1997	▼102.7	▼20,872.4	▲37.7	▲7,663.0	▼-2.6%	▲3.6%	19.8%	▼-1.3%
1998	▲103.1	▼20,587.9	▼30.9	▼6,171.8	▼-0.7%	▲3.7%	19.8%	▼-1.5%
1999	▲104.4	▼20,511.0	▲37.1	▲7,294.5	▼-0.2%	▲2.6%	▼19.7%	▲6.4%
2000	▲111.1	▲21,444.4	▲39.5	▲7,625.0	▲4.0%	▲-2.9%	19.7%	▲13.6%
2001	▲116.6	▲22,161.2	▼35.2	▼6,693.1	▲2.6%	▲-8.8%	19.7%	▼0.4%
2002	▼114.0	▼21,343.2	▼21.1	▼3,956.5	▼-3.7%	▲-9.9%	▼19.6%	▲7.0%
2003	▲135.0	▲24,905.2	▲27.0	▲4,986.3	▲16.1%	▲-2.1%	▼19.5%	▼6.2%
2004	▲146.7	▲26,626.3	▲34.1	▲6,180.4	▲5.8%	▲1.3%	19.5%	▲11.3%
2005	▲167.4	▲29,942.7	▲48.9	▲8,739.2	▲10.6%	▲2.7%	▼19.4%	▲30.4%
2006	▲173.0	▲30,408.6	▲60.1	▲10,561.4	▲0.3%	▲1.5%	19.4%	▼29.1%
2007	▲188.8	▲32,659.5	▲68.2	▲11,801.3	▲6.2%	▲6.2%	19.4%	▼28.4%
2008	▲192.1	▲32,666.6	▲86.8	▲14,762.6	▼-0.2%	▲10.4%	19.4%	▼27.7%
2009	▼184.8	▼31,007.5	▼60.8	▼10,202.8	▼-4.4%	▲2.4%	19.4%	▼-5.5%
2010	▲196.4	▲32,515.4	▲75.4	▲12,478.0	▲5.0%	▲2.5%	▼19.3%	▲11.5%
2011	▼99.6	▼16,810.9	▼48.2	▼8,132.3	▼-50.3%	▲15.9%	▲19.4%	▼-11.5%
2012	▲172.5	▲27,458.8	▲92.5	▲14,728.1	▲86.8%	▲6.1%	▼19.0%	▲24.6%
2013	▼144.5	▼23,054.5	▼75.4	▼12,025.6	▼-18.0%	▲2.6%	▲19.5%	▼-16.3%
2014	▼126.9	▼20,273.6	▼57.4	▼9,166.6	▼-23.0%	▲2.4%	19.5%	▼-30.5%
2015	▲137.2	▲21,709.9	▼48.7	▼7,706.7	▼-0.8%	▲10.0%	19.5%	▲-28.5%
2016	▲137.4	▼21,520.7	▲49.9	▲7,817.6	▼-1.5%	▲25.9%	19.5%	▼-29.3%
2017	▲154.4	▲23,949.3	▲67.2	▲10,414.1	▲32.5%	▲25.9%	▼19.4%	▲-11.1%
2018	▲170.7	▲26,207.0	▲76.7	▲11,773.8	▲7.9%	▲14.0%	▲19.5%	▲9.4%
2019	▼154.3	▼23,454.9	▼69.2	▼10,526.3	▼-11.2%	▲-2.9%	▲19.7%	▲11.9%
2020	▼110.1	▼16,575.1	▼46.9	▼7,056.7	▼-29.5%	▲1.5%	▲20.1%	▼-22.3%
2021	▲147.1	▲21,929.0	▼39.0	▼5,813.3	▲28.3%	▲2.8%	▼19.6%	▲11.3%
2022	▼128.4	▼18,944.7	▲40.8	▲6,025.7	▼-18.5%	▲5.5%	n/a	▲15.8%
2023	▲156.7	▲22,899.5	▲43.8	▲6,391.8	▲17.9%	▲4.0%	n/a	▲22.1%
2024	▲172.8	▲24,997.2	▲45.6	▲6,599.0	▲8.0%	▲3.0%	n/a	▼18.8%
2025	▲188.8	▲27,034.7	▲47.7	▲6,836.3	▲7.2%	▲3.0%	n/a	▼16.5%
2026	▲200.5	▲28,434.6	▲49.1	▲6,964.6	▲4.2%	▲3.0%	n/a	▼13.5%
2027	▲212.8	▲29,874.1	▲50.5	▲7,096.0	▲4.1%	▲3.1%	n/a	▼9.7%

Notes:
1. For purchasing power parity comparisons, the US Dollar is exchanged at 0.77 Libyan Dinars only.

Mean wages were $9.51 per man-hour in 2009 (amounts to a compensation of $1598 for 21 working days of 8 hours).

== Oil sector ==
Development of oil production in Libya

Libya is an OPEC cartel member and holds the largest proven oil reserves in Africa (followed by Nigeria and Algeria), 41.5 Gbbl (6.60×10^{9} m^{3}) as of January 2007, up from 39.1 Gbbl (6.22×10^{9} m^{3}) in 2006. About 80% of Libya's proven oil reserves are located in the Sirte Basin, which is responsible for 90% of the country's oil output. The state-owned National Oil Corporation (NOC) dominates Libya's oil industry, along with smaller subsidiaries, which combined account for around 50% of the country's oil output. Among NOC's subsidiaries, the largest oil producer is the Waha Oil Company (WOC), followed by the Agoco, Zueitina Oil Company (ZOC), and Sirte Oil Company (SOC). Oil resources, which account for approximately 95% of export earnings, 75% of government receipts, and over 50% of GDP. Oil revenues constitute the principal foreign exchange source. Reflecting the heritage of the command economy, three-quarters of employment is in the public sector, and private investment remains small at around 2% of GDP.

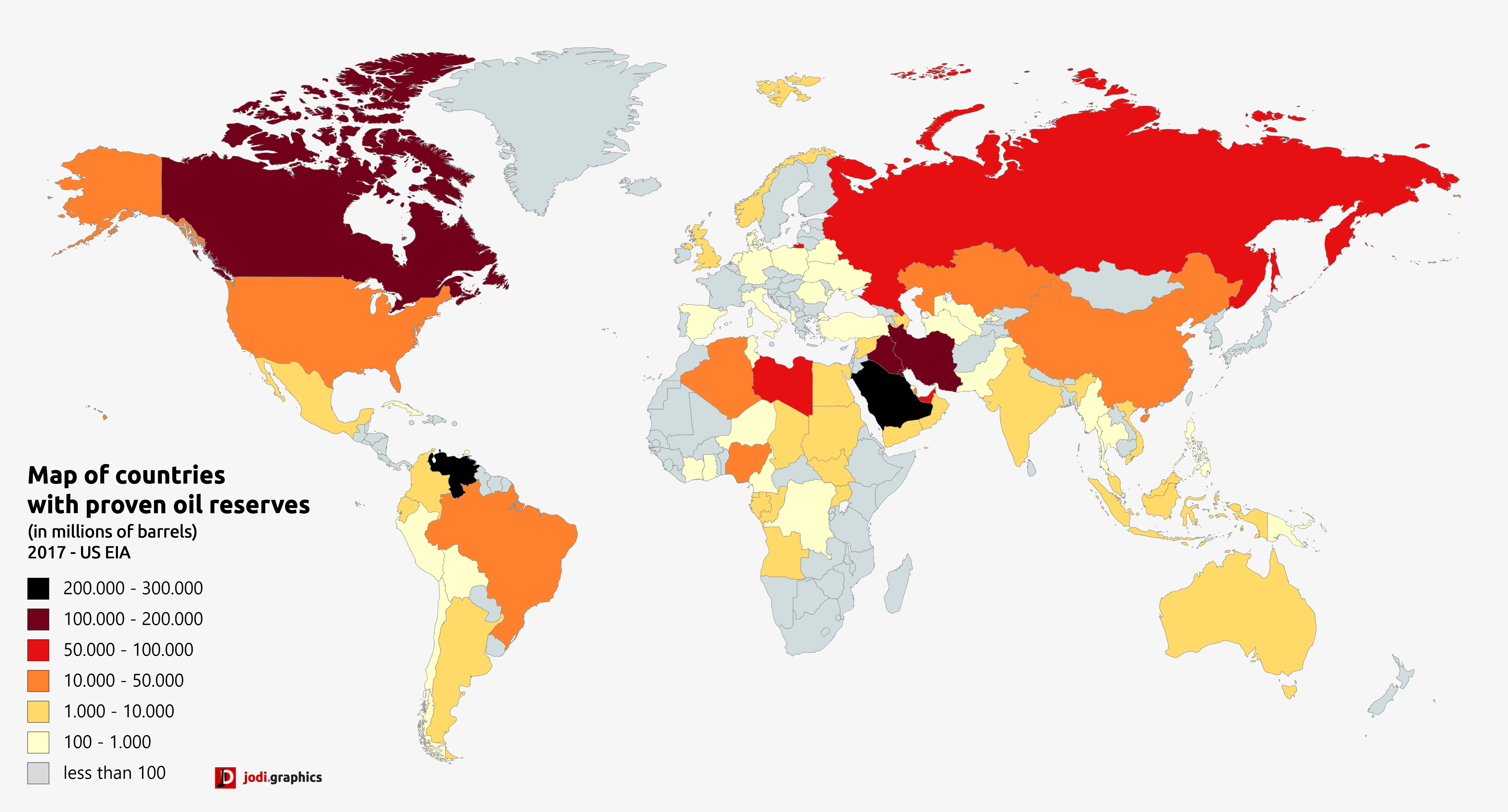
A map of world oil reserves according to U.S. EIA, 2017

Falling world oil prices in the early 1980s and economic sanctions caused a serious decline in economic activity, eventually leading to a slow private sector rehabilitation. At 2.6% per year on average, real GDP growth was modest and volatile during the 1990s. Libya's GDP grew in 2001 due to high oil prices, the end of a long cyclical drought, and increased foreign direct investment following the suspension of UN sanctions in 1999. Real GDP growth has been boosted by high oil revenues, reaching 4.6% in 2004 and 3.5% in 2005. Despite efforts to diversify the economy and encourage private sector participation, extensive controls of prices, credit, trade, and foreign exchange constrain growth.

Although UN sanctions were suspended in 1999, foreign investment in the Libyan gas and oil sectors were severely curtailed due to the U.S. Iran and Libya Sanctions Act (ILSA), which capped the amount foreign companies can invest in Libya yearly at $20 million (lowered from $40 million in 2001). As of May 2006, the U.S. has removed Libya from its list of states that sponsor terrorism and has normalised ties and removed sanctions. This clears the road for U.S. oil companies to exploit Libyan oil and is expected to have a positive impact on the Libyan economy.

The NOC hopes to raise oil production from 1.80 million bpd in 2006 to 2 million bpd by 2008. FDI into the oil sector is likely, which is attractive due to its low cost of oil recovery, high oil quality, and proximity to European markets. Most Libyan oil is sold on a term basis, including to the country's Oilinvest marketing network in Europe; to companies like Agip, OMV, Repsol YPF, Tupras, CEPSA, and Total; and small volumes to Asian and South African companies.

Statistic	Amount
Proven Oil Reserves (2007E)	41.5 Gbbl (6.60×10^{9} m^{3})
Oil Production (2006E)	1.8 million barrels per day (290×10^{3} m^{3}/d) (95% crude)
Oil Consumption (2006E)	284,000 barrels per day (45,200 m^{3}/d)
Net Oil Exports (2006E)	1.5 million barrels per day (240×10^{3} m^{3}/d)
Crude Oil Distillation Capacity (2006E)	378 kbbl/d (60.1×10^{3} m^{3}/d)
Proven Natural Gas Reserves (2007E)	52.7×10^{12} cu ft (1.49×10^{12} m^{3})
Natural Gas Production (2006E)	3,999×10^{9} cu ft (1.132×10^{11} m^{3})
Natural Gas consumption (2005E)	206×10^{9} cu ft (5.8×10^{9} m^{3})

Notes:
1. Energy Information Administration (2007)

=== Field Development and Exploration ===
Oil is Libya's major resource.

In November 2005, Repsol YPF discovered a significant oil deposit of light, sweet crude in the Murzuq Basin. Industry experts believe the discovery to be one of the biggest made in Libya for several years. Repsol YPF is joined by a consortium of partners including OMV, Total and Norsk Hydro. Also located in Murzuq Basin is Eni's Elephant field. In October 1997, a consortium led by British company Lasmo, along with Eni and a group of five South Korean companies, announced that it had discovered large recoverable crude reserves about 800 kilometres (500 mi) south of Tripoli. Lasmo estimated field production would cost around $1 per barrel. Elephant began production in February 2004.

WOC's Waha fields currently produce around 350,000 bbl/d (56,000 m^{3}/d). In 2005, ConocoPhillips and co-venturers reached an agreement with NOC to return to its operations in Libya and extend the Waha concession 25 years. ConocoPhillips operates the Waha fields with a 16.33% share in the project. NOC has the largest share of the Waha concession, and additional partners include Marathon and Amerada Hess.

=== Refining and Downstream ===
Libya has five domestic refineries:

Refinery	Capacity	Operator
Zawia Refinery	120,000	ZOC
Ras Lanuf Refinery	220,000	Ras Lanuf
El-Brega Refinery	10,000	SOC
Tobruk Refinery	20,000	Agoco
Sarir Refinery	10,000	Agoco

Notes:
1. Amounts in barrels per day.

== Other sectors ==
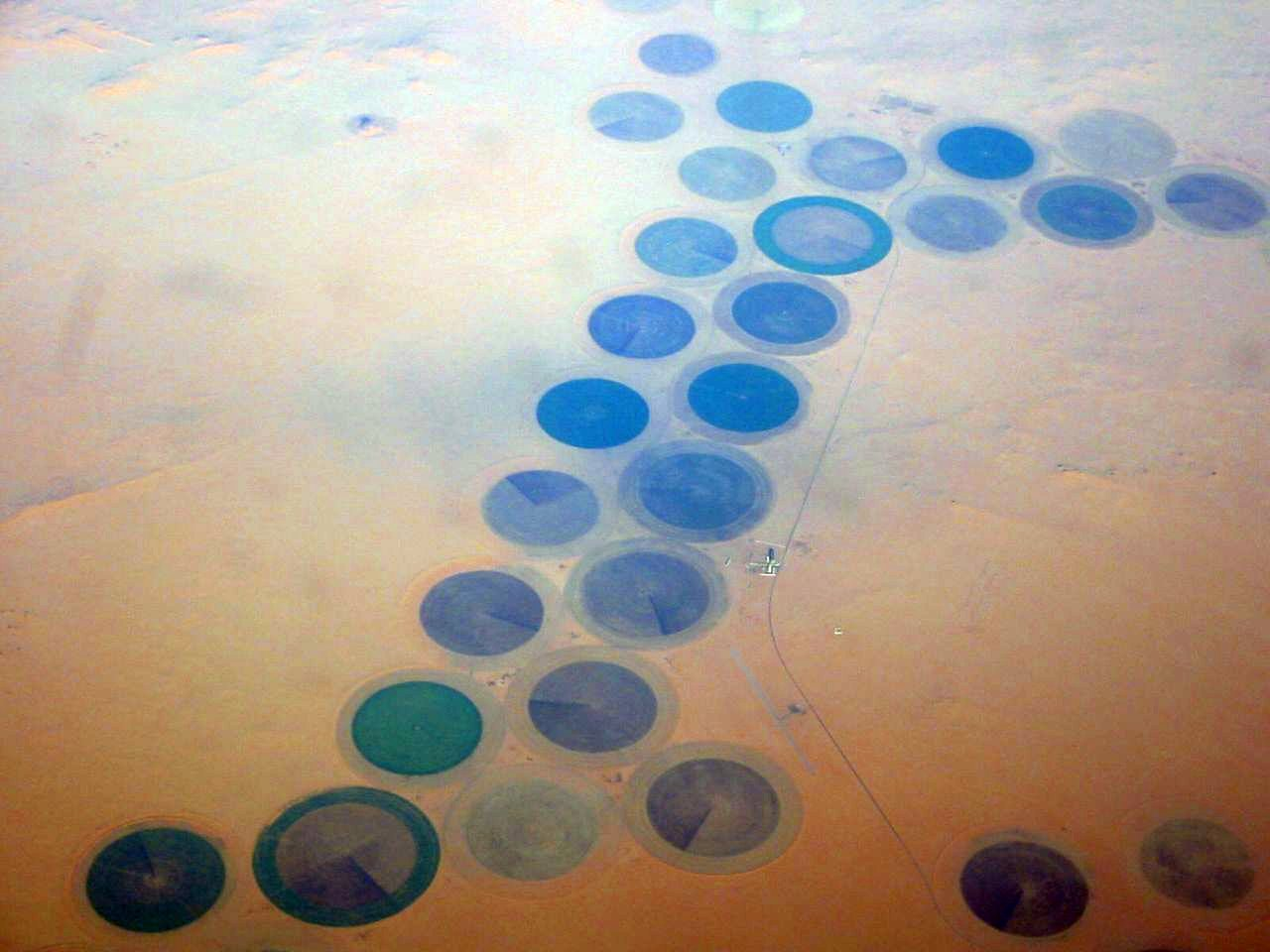
Pivot irrigation in Kufra, southeast Cyrenaica. Oil wealth has enabled Libya to pursue extravagant projects such as agriculture and the Great Manmade River in the Sahara Desert.

=== Agriculture ===
Although agriculture is the second-largest sector in the economy, Libya depends on imports in most foods. Climatic conditions and poor soils severely limit farm output, and domestic food production meets only about 25% of demand. Domestic conditions limit output, while higher incomes and a growing population have caused food consumption to rise. Because of low rainfall levels in Libya, agricultural projects such as the Kufra oasis rely on underground water sources. Libya's primary agricultural water source remains the Great Manmade River (GMMR), but significant resources are being invested in desalinization research to meet growing demand. Libyan agricultural projects and policies are overseen by a General Inspector; there is no Ministry of Agriculture, per se.

Libya produced in 2018:

- 348 thousand tons of potato;
- 236 thousand tons of watermelon;
- 215 thousand tons of tomato;
- 188 thousand tons of olive;
- 183 thousand tons of onion;
- 176 thousand tons of date;
- 138 thousand tons of wheat;
- 93 thousand tons of barley;
- 72 thousand tons of vegetable;
- 60 thousand tons of plum;
- 53 thousand tons of orange;

In addition to smaller productions of other agricultural products.

=== Mining ===
The mining industry of Libya does not contribute significantly to its economy. Mining resources are located in remote regions with limited accessibility. The fuel sector, including oil reserves (which have a capacity of 29.5 billion barrels) and natural gas (which has 1.31 trillion cubic meters of reserve) is the major revenue-generating industry.

The Wadi ash-Shati' may hold one of the world's biggest iron ore deposits.

=== Tourism ===
The tourism industry was heavily hit by the Libyan Civil War. Before the war tourism was developing, with 149,000 tourists visiting Libya in 2004, rising to 180,000 in 2007, although this still only contributed less than 1% of the country's GDP. There were 1,000,000 day visitors in the same year. The country is best known for its ancient Greek and Roman ruins and Sahara desert landscapes.

== Labor market ==
Libya posted a 3.3% rate of population growth during 1960–2003. In 2003, 86% of the population was urban, compared to 45% in 1970. Although no reliable estimates are available, unemployment is reportedly acute: over 50% of the population under the age of 20. Moreover, despite the bias of labor market regulations favoring Libyan workers, the mismatch of the educational system with market demand has produced a large pool of expatriate workers, with typically better-suited education and higher productivity. However, because of shortages for manual labor, Libya has also attracted important numbers of less skilled immigrants. Expatriate workers represent an estimated fifth of the labor force.

Although significant, the proportion of expatriate workers is still below oil producing countries in the Persian Gulf. Foreign workers mainly come from the Maghreb, Egypt, Turkey, India, the Philippines, Malaysia, Thailand, Vietnam, Poland, Chad, Sudan, and Bosnia and Herzegovina. They tend to earn relatively high wages, taking either skilled or hard manual jobs. Census data for 2000 show the share of expatriates earning over LD 300 (US$230) per month was 20%, compared to 12% for Libyan nationals. A campaign encouraging conversion of qualified civil servants to entrepreneurs, in the face of public sector over employment and declining productivity, does not seem to be producing the desired results thus far.

== External trade and finance ==
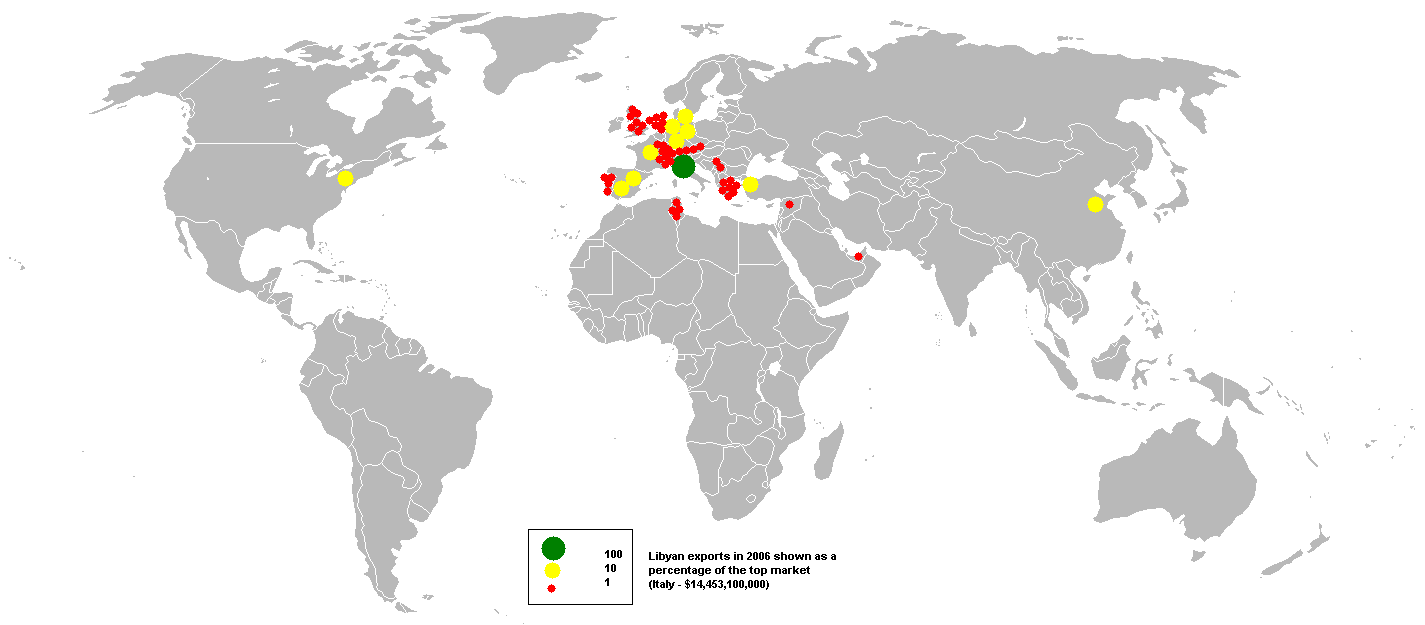
Libyan export destinations in 2006.

Exports of Libya by product category (2019) Chemical products Transportation Machines Mineral products Plastics and rubbers Metals Foodstuffs Precious metals Textiles Instruments Animal products Vegetable products Paper goods Footwear and headwear Miscellaneous Stone and glass Wood products Animal and vegetable bi-products Animal hides Arts and antiques Weapons

The Government is in the process of preparing a financial sector reform program. Recent legislation setting corporate governance standards for financial institutions makes progress towards better management and greater operational independence of public banks. However, Libyan public banks still lack management structures supported by skills in critical areas like credit, investment, risk management, and information and control systems.

The new banking law reinforces the independence of the Central Bank of Libya (CBL) and offers a legal framework for regulating banking activities, even if some provisions call for improvement. Despite progress brought by the new banking Law that specifies and limits its duties and responsibilities, the CBL remains the owner of the public banks, with the associated potential conflict of interest between ownership and regulation.

Financial sector reform has also progressed with partial interest rate liberalization. Interest rates have been liberalized on deposits, while a lending rate ceiling has been set above the discount rate. The Libyan Stock Exchange, established in 2007, is the first exchange of its kind in the country.

In 2011, Libya Oil Holdings had its €38m stake in Irish exploration firm Circle Oil frozen on foot of a European Union order that's been put in place to put pressure on the Gaddafi regime.

Tunisia's exports to Libya, exceeding 18% growth between 2020 and 2024.

A significant reliance on cement imports from Egypt, Turkey, and Tunisia is worth noting.

Two trans-African automobile routes pass through Libya:

- Cairo-Dakar Highway
- Tripoli-Cape Town Highway

== Statistics ==
Household income or consumption by percentage share:
lowest 11%: NA%
highest 10%: NA%

Industrial production growth rate: 2.7% (2009)

Electricity - production: 24 billion kWh (2007 est)

Electricity - production by source:
fossil fuel: 100%
hydro: 0%
nuclear: 0%
other: 0% (1998)

Electricity - consumption: 22.17 billion kWh (2007 est)

Electricity - exports: 104 million kWh (2007)

Electricity - imports: 77 million kWh (2007)

Agriculture - products: wheat, barley, olives, dates, citrus, vegetables, peanuts, soybeans, cattle, corn

== International rankings ==
Organisation	Survey	Ranking
The Economist	The World in 2005 - Worldwide quality-of-life index, 2005	70 out of 111
Energy Information Administration	Greatest Oil Reserves by Country, 2006	9 out of 20
Reporters Without Borders	Press Freedom Index (2007)	155 out of 169
Transparency International	Corruption Perceptions Index 2007	131 out of 180
United Nations Development Programme	Human Development Index 2005	58 out of 177

== See also ==
- Central Bank of Libya
- List of companies of Libya
- List of banks in Libya
- United Nations Economic Commission for: Africa & Western Asia
