= Manuel Doreste =

Spanish sailor (1958–2026)

Manuel Doreste Blanco (31 January 1958 – 16 July 2026) was a Spanish Olympic sailor in the Soling class. He participated in the 2000 Summer Olympics.

== Biography ==
Manuel Doreste Blanco was born in Puertollano on 31 January 1958. He was related to Gustavo Doreste, José Luis Doreste, and Luis Doreste. Doreste won the 1994 Soling World Championship.

Doreste died in Las Palmas on 16 July 2026, at the age of 68.
