= Energy in Libya =

Energy in Libya primarily revolves around the production, consumption, import, and export of energy, with a significant focus on the petroleum industry, which serves as the backbone of the Libyan economy. As of 2021, Libya is recognized as the seventh-largest crude oil producer in OPEC and ranks third in total petroleum liquids production in Africa. The country holds 3% of the world's proven oil reserves and 39% of Africa's, marking it as a key player in the global energy sector. Despite its abundant resources, the energy industry in Libya has faced significant challenges due to political instability following the civil war that began in 2011. These challenges have led to frequent disruptions in oil production and exports, directly impacting the national economy and its contributions to the global oil market. The sector's future is closely tied to the resolution of political conflicts and the effective management of its vast hydrocarbon resources.

== Overview ==
From 2004 to 2008, Libyan energy production increased by 21.5% and energy exports increased by 27%. Domestic energy consumption in Libya was likely driven by industry and population growth. During this period, according to the International Energy Agency, the world population grew 5.3%, and the Libyan population grew 9.4%. As a net exporter of oil, Libya's energy production was also stimulated by growing populations in countries like Egypt (12.2% growth in that period), Yemen (13.4%), Sudan (16.4%), Saudi Arabia (2.9%), and Italy (3%).

Libya's economy heavily depends on revenue generated from exporting crude oil and natural gas. According to Libya's Central Bank, in 2021, oil revenues alone accounted for an estimated 98% of the total government revenues. Furthermore, in 2020, the combined revenues from oil and natural gas exports constituted approximately 73% of Libya's total export value.

In 2020, the total energy supply (TES) primarily came from oil and gas, which contributed 53% and 43%, respectively, while renewables accounted for approximately 4%. Bioenergy comprised 100% of the renewable energy supply.

Energy in Libya
	Capita	Prim. energy	Production	Export	Electricity	CO_{2}-emission
	Million	TWh	TWh	TWh	TWh	Mt
2004	5.74	212	993	780	14,46	43,51
2007	6.16	207	1,181	971	23,88	43,13
2008	6.28	212	1,206	991	24,61	44,85
2009	6.42	237	1,013	772	26.12	50.05
2010	6.36	223	1,030	803	27.14	51.61
2012	6.42	155	360	203	23.96	34.89
2012R	6.16	199	1,009	803	29.58	44.20
2013	6.20	198	718	515	24.58	43.23
Change 2004-10	10.8%	5.3%	3.7%	2.9%	87.7%	18.6%
Mtoe = 11.63 TWh, Prim. energy includes energy losses 2012R = CO_{2} calculation criteria changed, numbers updated

== Energy sources ==
=== Oil ===
Oil is the major natural resource of Libya, with estimated reserves of 43.6 billion barrels.

Libya is a member of OPEC. In 2007, Libya was the world's 10th largest oil exporter, with 73 Mt in oil exports. As of 2009, Europe's share of Libya's oil exports was 78%. Domestically, the primary energy use in Libya was 237 TWh and 37 TWh per million persons.

The National Oil Corporation is the state oil company of Libya. The biggest oil producers in Libya are Eni, an Italian company, and Repsol YPF, a Spanish one. Other major producers in the country include BASF, Petrobras, Gazprom, ExxonMobil, Pertamina, Nippon Oil, Sirte Oil Company, BP, Hess Corporation, JAPEX, and Oil & Natural Gas Corporation.

In 2010, 28% of Libyan oil exports went to Italy (over 284,000 barrels a day). In 2009, Europe's share of total Libyan oil exports were around 78%. Other importers in 2009 included China (10%), the United States (5%), and Brazil (3%).

A surge in state-sanctioned fuel trafficking between 2022 and 2024 cost Libya approximately $20 billion in lost revenue.

Oil production from 2011 to 2021 (kbd)
2011	2012	2013	2014	2015	2016	2017	2018	2019	2020	2021
516	1,539	1,048	518	437	412	929	1,165	1,228	425	1,269

=== Natural gas ===
By the end of 2021, Libya possessed proved natural gas reserves totaling 53 trillion cubic feet (Tcf), ranking fifth in Africa, behind Nigeria, Algeria, Mozambique, and Egypt.

In 2019, Libya consumed 271 billion cubic feet (Bcf) of natural gas, approximately half of its domestic production. The power sector predominantly accounts for the country's domestic natural gas demand, representing roughly 90% of its consumption in 2020.

Natural gas production from 2011 to 2021 (bcm)
2011	2012	2013	2014	2015	2016	2017	2018	2019	2020	2021
7.5	11.6	12.2	11.8	14.7	14.8	13.6	13.2	13.5	12.1	12.4

In 2024, Libya experienced a significant decline in natural gas production, with projections indicating further substantial decreases by 2025, particularly affecting the Wafa and Bouri fields.

==== International Importance and Pipeline Infrastructure ====
Libyan natural gas is crucial for European energy security, particularly for Italy, which sourced 4% of its natural gas imports from Libya in 2023 via the Greenstream pipeline. This pipeline plays a key role in connecting Libyan gas fields directly to Sicily.

=== Renewables ===
The government of Libya promotes renewable energy through the Renewable Energy Authority of Libya. The Libya Renewable Energy Strategic Plan 2013–2025, released in 2012, sets a goal of 10% renewable energy contribution to the country's energy mix by 2025. Renewable energy will come from wind, concentrated solar power, photovoltaic, and solar water heating.

Libya is among 13 countries that have not submitted climate pledges under the Paris Agreement.

Total renewable energy capacity, 2014-2023 (MW)
2014	2015	2016	2017	2018	2019	2020	2021	2022	2023
5	5	5	5	5	5	5	6	6	8

The country has a high potential for wind and solar energy. Construction has begun on a 100 MW solar power plant in the town of Kufra in southeastern Libya.

=== Nuclear ===
Libya became a member of the IAEA in 1963.

Libya has a Soviet-designed 10 MWt research reactor in Tajura that was built in 1981.

In the late 1970s, Libya signed a contract with the Soviet nuclear company Atomenergoexport for two VVER-440 reactors, each delivering 440 megawatts (MW) of electrical power on the Gulf of Sirte. The reactors were intended to serve a dual-use for electric power generation and seawater desalination. As Libya was discontented with the technology the USSR wanted to provide them with, the Belgian nuclear company Belgonucleaire was asked to take over the contract. However, due to objection from the United States for concerns regarding misuse of nuclear weapons development, Belgonucleaire refused and Libya asked the USSR again. In the end, the project was stopped during its planning phase in 1986.

In 2006 Libya and France signed an agreement on peaceful uses of atomic energy, and in July 2007, they signed a memorandum of understanding related to building a mid-sized nuclear plant with Areva reactor for seawater desalination. This deal was opposed by Germany. This was followed by a memorandum with Canada, to share nuclear medicine, desalinization technology and co-operation over nuclear energy research.

In 2010, prior to the death of Muammar Gaddafi, Libya confirmed that it intended to create a nuclear energy sector.

== Electricity ==
In 2019, Libya's electricity generation reached an estimated output of 32 terawatt-hours (TWh). The primary fuel sources for electricity generation in Libya are natural gas, accounting for 67%, and oil, contributing 33%. Diesel and fuel oil are the main petroleum sources utilized in power plants, although facilities located at oil fields sometimes turn to crude oil when imported refined products are unavailable. Owing to frequent blackouts, many businesses in Libya depend on diesel-fired generators as a backup power source.

In 2021, Libya generated a total of 34,629 gigawatt-hours (GWh) of electricity, with non-renewable sources accounting for 34,621 GWh, representing almost 100% of the total generation. Renewable sources, notably solar power, had a minimal impact, contributing only 8 GWh. The country's solar power sector primarily consists of small-scale endeavors like mini-grids in hospitals and public lighting projects. The government has set a target of sourcing 22% of its electricity from renewables by 2030 to diversify its energy mix. Libya's solar potential has drawn foreign investment, with TotalEnergies intending to develop 500 MW of solar power projects.

== See also ==
- List of power stations in Libya
- Oil megaprojects (2011)
