= José Luis Doreste =

Spanish sailor (born 1956)

Personal information
- Full name: José Luis Doreste Blanco
- Born: 19 September 1956 (age 69) Las Palmas de Gran Canaria, Las Palmas, Spain

Sailing career
- Sport: Sailing
- Class(es): Finn, Star
Medal record
Men's sailing
Representing Spain
Olympic Games
Gold medal – first place	1988 Seoul	Finn class
Mediterranean Games
Gold medal – first place	1979 Split	Finn class

José Luis Doreste Blanco (Note: In this Spanish name, the first or paternal surname is Doreste and the second or maternal family name is Blanco.) (born 19 September 1956) is a Spanish sailor and Olympic champion. He was born in Las Palmas de Gran Canaria, Las Palmas. He competed at the 1988 Summer Olympics in Seoul, where he won a gold medal in the Finn class. In 1998–99, he was a crewmember on Fortuna Extra Lights in the Whitbread Round the World Yacht Race.

He is in the Finn & Star classes

== Biography ==
He is the brother of Gustavo Doreste and Luis Doreste, and the uncle of Manuel Doreste. He is a five-time Olympian.

He won his 1st medal in the 1979 Mediterranean Games
