= The Law Society of Libya =

- المجمع القانوني الليبي

- Established: 2022
- Founded at: Libya
- Type: Civil Society Organisation
- Purpose: Digitalisation, archiving, and indexing of Libyan Legal documents
- Headquarters: Tripoli
- Website: https://lawsociety.ly

The Law Society of Libya (Arabic: المجمع القانوني الليبي) is a civil society organisation based in Tripoli, Libya, dedicated to the digitalisation, archiving, and indexing of legal documents spanning over 80 years of national legal and legislative history, up to the present time. Established in 2022, this initiative aims to facilitate the accessibility and searchability of legal resources for professionals and the public online, contributing to broader efforts to address Libya's 170th ranking out of 180 countries on the 2023 Transparency International Index.

Through its searchable digital platform, the Law Society of Libya has effectively made over 300,000 legal documents available, digitalised, categorised, and made more accessible. Libyan institutions frequently use this platform as reference, including the Ministry of Justice, the Ministry of Foreign Affairs, the Ministry of Education, the Ministry of Finance, the Customs Authority and the Information and Documentation Centre, under the Prime Minister's Office.

Some foreign governments, such as the United Kingdom, Canada, Germany, Turkey, and the European Commission, also use the platform as a reference in travel advice, intellectual property, immigration, trade and public procurement.

The Law Society of Libya's platform continuously publishes the latest legal information and archives old legislation, providing periodic updates as an accurate, unbiased, and reliable source for legal standards and practices in Libya.

== History ==
In response to the complex legal and political challenges that emerged in Libya post-2011, the Law Society of Libya established its digital platform in February 2022. This platform has become a crucial tool for accessing justice and legal services, severely hindered by a fragmented and transitional nature of Libyan governmental structures and institutions.

The platform organises and digitises all Libyan legislation, providing a valuable resource for legal professionals, academics, researchers, and the general public, locally and globally. The platform contains extensive collections of Libyan laws (commercial, civil, criminal, and administrative), decisions, decrees, treaties, and educational materials (guides, summaries, and explanations of complex legal concepts from intellectual property to criminal procedures).

The Law Society of Libya organises workshops and seminars open to the public and legal professionals, making them accessible to all interested parties. This encourages interaction and joint discussion, provides analyses of judicial rulings, and promotes a more aware and engaged society, by providing opportunities for professional development.

Originally established as a non-governmental and non-profit initiative to digitise legal publications, the platform has become the primary source for Libya's legal information. It maintains an apolitical stance and independence from governmental influence, ensuring the accessibility and transparency of Libya's legal information and guaranteeing credible, reliable publications without opinions or modifications.

== Legal framework ==
The Law Society of Libya is registered as an independent non-governmental organisation in Libya under registration number 2022–322 with the Civil Society Commission. It operates according to Decision No. 286 of 2019 issued by the Presidential Council, regarding the adoption of the regulatory framework for the Civil Society Commission's operation.

== Impact and contributions ==
Though its online platform, the Law Society of Libya has made more than 300,000 pages of Libyan legislation available on the Internet. This extensive archive includes Libyan constitutions, 497 agreements and treaties, 1,986 laws, 637 regulations, 6,442 decisions, 808 decrees, 256 circulars, 31 drafts laws, 1,806 Supreme Court rulings (appeals), 64 legal advisory opinions, 266 trademarks, and 1,981 issues of the official gazette up to July 2024. This comprehensive legal resource supports civil society organisations, legal professionals, news agencies, academics, and the public by facilitating access to and understanding Libyan law. It also enables historians to research the social and political impacts of legislation.

The Law Society of Libya also offers legal archiving training for the purpose of archiving and publishing legislation within the Society. This training aims to develop participants’ technical skills, enhance their understanding of legislation and history, improve employment opportunities and professional growth. It also supports volunteer work in the legal field and accelerates access to legal legislation.

== Support ==
The Law Society of Libya primarily receives support in the form of donations from individuals and various entities such as: Libyan Spider Company, the Libyan Technology Foundation, and Mersin Joint-Stock Company, as it is a non-profit organization.

In 2022, the Society 's revenue amounted to approximately 123,000 Libyan dinars, while in 2023, the revenue reached around a quarter of a million Libyan dinars.
