= Circle Oil =

Irish oil and gas company

Circle Oil PLC
- Type: Public company
- Industry: Energy
- Founded: 2006
- Defunct: 2017
- Fate: Administration, Liquidation
- Headquarters: Limerick, Ireland
- Area served: Egypt, Morocco, Tunisia
- Key people: Stephen Jenkins (Chairman); Mitch Flegg (CEO); Susan Prior (Finance)
- Products: Oil and Gas
- Revenue: US$84.6 million (2014)
- Number of employees: 25
- Website: circleoil.net (archive)

Circle Oil (AIM: COP) was an oil and gas exploration and production company based in Limerick in the Republic of Ireland. Its operations, all of which were in North Africa, specifically Egypt, Morocco and Tunisia, initially focused on oil exploration but expanded to include production.

Circle Oil entered administration in January 2017 and sold its Egypt and Moroccan assets to SDX Energy to pay creditors. In September 2017 it began liquidation.

== Company regions ==
=== Morocco ===
Circle Oil Maroc Ltd. (COML), a wholly owned subsidiary of Circle Oil Plc signed an Exploration and Exploitation Agreement with ONHYM (Office National des Hydrocarbures et des Mines (the State oil company) for the Sebou Permit in June 2006 (original area 296 km2, now 134 km2 after relinquishments). The permit was situated in the Rharb Basin. The Permit shareholding was COML 75% and ONHYM 25%. Circle was the operator of the license. Production was decided by sales contracts, the daily maxima in the region 6.8 to 7.1 million ft^{3} (190 to 200 thousand m^{3}) gross per day at standard conditions.

Circle completed its third drilling campaign in Morocco in 2015. Ten wells were drilled, 6 in the Sebou permit and 4 in Lalla Mimouna. Gas was discovered in both areas, with 6 of the ten wells yielding gas.

In addition to its Moroccan drilling programme Circle also successfully built a 55 km gas pipeline from the Sebou permit to the Kenitra Industrial zone. All of Circle's Moroccan gas was sold domestically in Morocco and was transported through this pipeline from the license to the end users in Kenitra.

=== Egypt ===
Circle Oil’s acreage lay in the Gulf of Suez area. This basin covers approximately 19,000 km2. In early 2008 Circle Oil farmed into the North West Gemsa Block acquiring a 40% interest in the license from Premier Oil. Together they totaled around 82 km2 and were located roughly 300 km south of Cairo. The concessions were operated by a joint production company PetroAmir, whose partners include: EGPC, Zhen Hua (NPIC - 50% working interest and operator); Circle Oil Plc (40% working interest); and Sea Dragon Energy (10% working interest).

Daily production from all Egyptian fields was around 7,000 barrels per day (1,100 cubic metres per day) of 42° API oil and 10 million ft^{3} (280 thousand m^{3}) gross per day at standard conditions. Following production of 17.63 million bbl (2.80 million m^{3}) through to the end of 2014, the 2P Gross Remaining Reserves were estimated in an independent Competent Person’s report to be 52.16 million bbl (8.29 million m^{3}) oil equivalent of oil, gas, and recoverable liquids with 20.86 million bbl (3.32 million m^{3}) oil equivalent net to Circle Oil.

=== Tunisia ===
Circle Oil Tunisia Ltd (a wholly owned subsidiary of Circle Oil Plc.) held interests in two permits in Tunisia, the onshore Ras Marmour permit and the Mahdia permit offshore incorporating the Mahdia discovery.

In August 2014, Circle announced a significant discovery at The El Mediouni well, or EMD-1 in the Mahdia permit. The well encountered very good light oil shows across 133 metres. The Company estimated that the likely recoverable resource was approximately 16 million cubic metres (100 million barrels). Circle subsequently added that it had been granted a six-month extension to the Mahdia permit to January 2015, and it has the right to make two further 3-year extensions by committing to drill at least one well in each period. The company indicated that it intended to seek a farm in partner with whom to develop the Mahdia discovery.

Ras Marmour Permit was located in the south-east of Tunisia covering part of the Island of Djerba and south of the Gulf of Gabès. The permit covered 1,564 km^{2} and was located in the vicinity of two significant hydrocarbon discoveries and a number of smaller ones. Circle Oil Tunisia held a 23% working interest in the permit. The operator and partner was Exxoil S A., a local Tunisian company.

In addition to the two exploration permits, Circle also had an interest in the Beni Khalled production license in Tunisia. Under the terms of the farm in agreement with Exxoil SA, Circle Oil would acquire an initial 30% interest in the Licence in return for funding a 50 km^{2} 3D seismic programme and one well. Historical production on the license has so far produced some 190 thousand cubic metres (1.2 million barrels) and Circle estimates indicated the field had up to 79 thousand m^{3} (0.5 million bbl) remaining to be produced.
