= Elephant Field =

Libyan oil field

- Country: Libya
- Location: Murzuq Basin
- Block: NC-174
- Offshore/onshore: Onshore
- Operators: Eni
- Partners: National Oil Corporation; Eni; Daewoo; Gazprom

Field history
- Discovery: 1997
- Start of production: 2004

Production
- Current production of oil: 125,000 barrels per day (~6.23×10^{6} t/a)
- Recoverable oil: 700 million barrels (~9.5×10^{7} t)

The Elephant Field (also known as the El Feel Field) is an oil field located in onshore in Libya's Murzuq Basin.

== History ==
In October 1997, an international consortium led by British company LASMO, along with Eni (33%) and a group of five South Korean companies, announced that it had discovered large recoverable crude reserves (around 700 million barrels) at the NC-174 Block, which is located in the southwestern Libyan Desert about 465 miles (800 km) south of Tripoli, Libya. Other participants in the block included Agip Nord Africa B.V. and a consortium of Korean companies, which included the Daesung Group, Daewoo International Corp., Hyundai Corporation, Korea Petroleum Development Corp., and the Majuko Group.

LASMO had entered Libya in 1990 with the Korean consortium named PEDCO and carried out the initial exploration programme of geological fieldwork, 2500 km of seismic acquisition and the drilling of four wildcat wells that led to two oil discoveries in 1993–94. This initial success ensured the viability of further exploration in the area and therefore the pursuit of the Elephant Prospect. The LASMO-PEDCO exploration team had identified the Elephant feature on its extensive seismic database and negotiated with the Libyan NOC to extend the concession area to include the entire prospect. LASMO was subsequently purchased by ENI.

LASMO estimated that production from the field would cost around $1 per barrel. Development costs were estimated to be $500 million. Elephant began production in February 2004 at around 10,000 barrels per day (1,600 cubic metres per day). In 2006, Eni indicated that Elephant was producing at around 125,000 barrels per day (19,900 cubic metres per day), and the company was hoping to see the field reach full capacity of 150,000 barrels per day (24,000 cubic metres per day) by 2008.

The operator of the Elephant Field is Agip Oil Company Limited, a company equally owned by NOC and Eni.

In March 2015, operations at the field suffered power outages due to power supply problems.

== Other Eni fields in Libya ==
- Bu Attifel field
- Wafa field
- Bahr Essalam field
- Bouri field
- Western Libyan Gas Project

== See also ==
- List of oil fields
