= Luis Doreste =

Spanish sailor

Medal record

Sailing

Representing Spain

Olympic Games
Gold medal – first place	1984 Los Angeles	470 class
Gold medal – first place	1992 Barcelona	Flying Dutchman

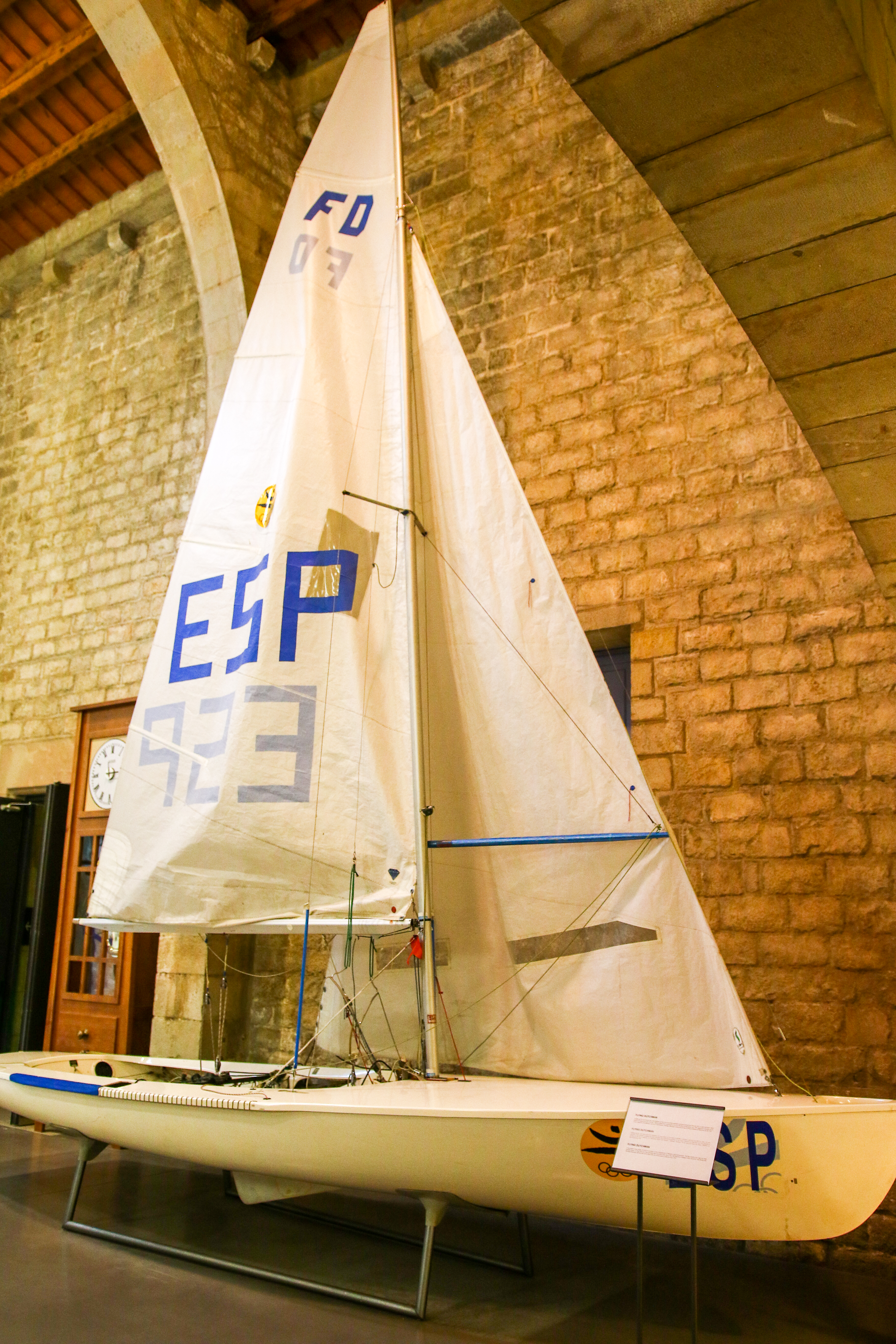
Flying Dutchman with which Luis Doreste and Domingo Manrique won at the 1992 Summer Olympics, Maritime Museum of Barcelona.

Luís Doreste Blanco (Note: In this Spanish name, the first or paternal surname is Doreste and the second or maternal family name is Blanco.) (born 7 March 1961 in Las Palmas de Gran Canaria, Las Palmas) is a Spanish sailor who won gold medal both in the 1984 Summer Olympics (470 class), and in the 1992 Summer Olympics in Barcelona (Flying Dutchman).

A member of Real Club Náutico de Gran Canaria, Doreste became World champion in 1985 (Flying Dutchman), and again in 1995 (Soling). He is three times European Champion, from 1976 (Optimist), 1985 (470) and 1988 (Flying Dutchman). He is a four-time Olympian.

Doreste took the Athlete's Oath at Barcelona in 1992. He is the brother of Manuel Doreste, Gustavo Doreste and José Luis Doreste.

He skippered Desafío Español 2007 at the 2007 Louis Vuitton Cup.
