= Petroleum Law of 1955 =

Libya's Petroleum Law No. 25 of 1955 was the law of Libya which authorised the allocation of land to individual oil prospectors, and the drilling of oil wells. It followed the Minerals Law of 1953, which established a system for obtaining permits to survey (but not drill) for petroleum. Despite the multiple changes of government and legal framework since its enactment, As of 2007, it remained in effect. It does not contain any provisions for natural gas drilling. In the 2000s, the Libyan government began work on drafting a new petroleum law.

The law established a Petroleum Commission, which made decisions on whether or not to grant concessions. Initial drafts of the law stipulated that provincial governors had the power to appoint members of the commission, and also made final decisions on concessions. However, these powers were eliminated in the final version of the law, in what historian Dirk Vandewalle described as a rare example of the national interest overriding that of the provinces.

Under the law, a contractor working for the National Oil Corporation is permitted to bring equipment into Libya free of import duties; however, this provision does not apply to contractors working for private oil companies, who are governed by the Administrative Contracts Regulation 2000. Amendments to the law in 1961 and 1965 altered the calculation of royalties. The 1961 amendments in particular meant that independent oil companies paid significantly less in taxes than the major oil companies.

Germany was one of the first countries to work within Libya on oil and gas, specifically the company Wintershall was one of the first to reach concessions in Libya, and this was renewed with talks in 2023.
