= Bouri Field =

Libyan offshore oil field

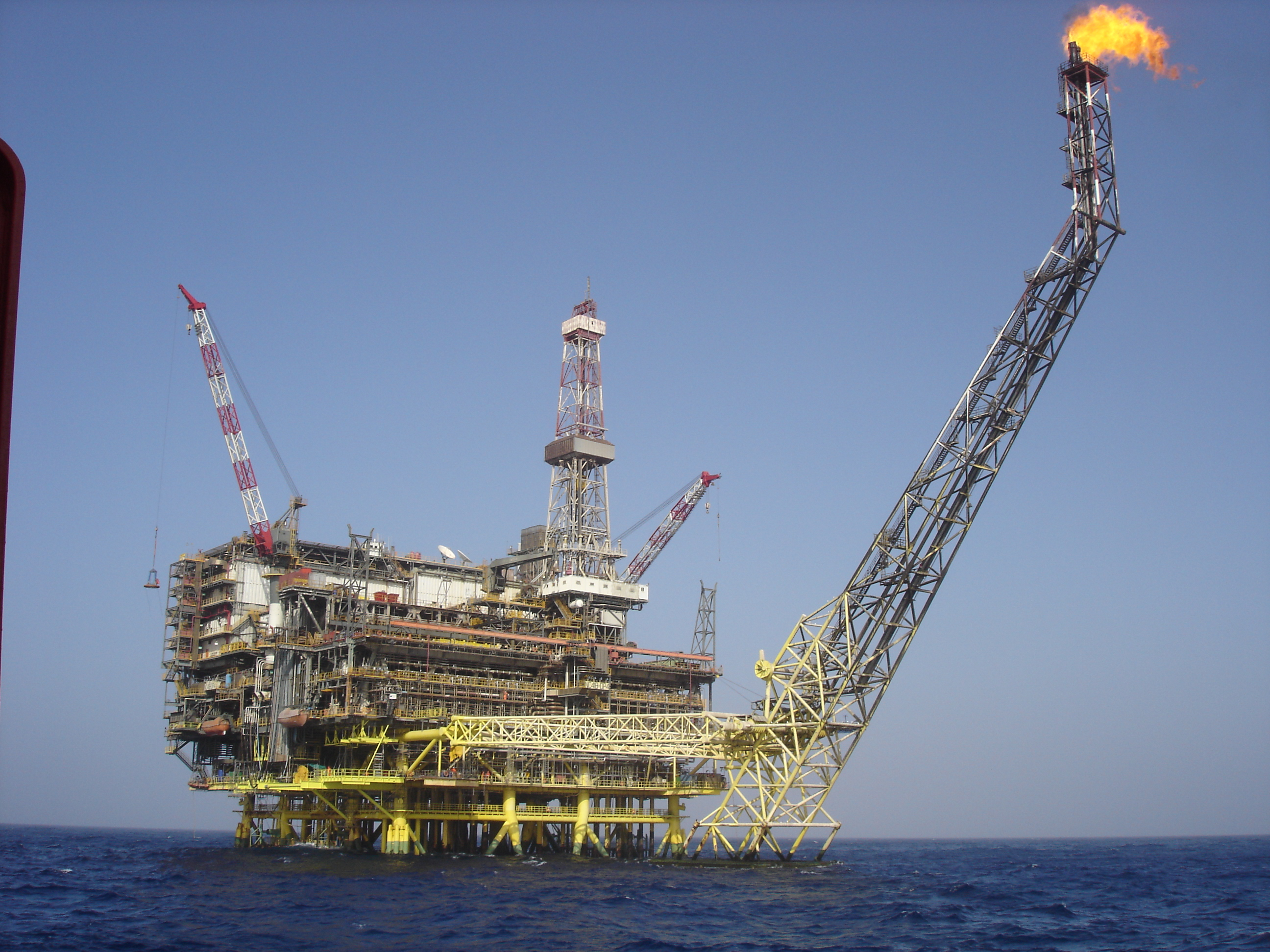
- ENI Oil Bouri DP4 is the biggest platform in the Mediterranean sea.

- Location within Mediterranean
- Country: Libya
- Location/block: Pelagian Basin Block NC41
- Offshore/onshore: Offshore
- Coordinates: 33.89°N 12.61°E
- Operators: (Italy) Eni
- Partners: National Oil Corporation

Field history
- Discovery: 1976
- Start of production: 1988
- Peak of production: NA
- Abandonment: NA

Production
- Current production of oil: 60,000 barrels per day (~3.0×10^{6} t/a)
- Producing formations: Bou Dabbous-Tertiary

The Bouri Offshore Field is part of Block NC-41, which is located 120 kilometers (75 mi) north of the Libyan coast in the Mediterranean Sea. It was first discovered in 1976 at a depth of 8,700 feet (2,700 m) and is estimated to contain 4.5 billion barrels (720,000,000 m^{3}) in proven recoverable crude oil reserves and 3.5 trillion cubic feet (99 km^{3}) of associated natural gas with an annual production potential of 6 billion m³. Bouri is considered the largest producing oilfield in the Mediterranean.

== Discovery and development ==
=== Overview ===
In 1974, the Italian oil company Eni S.p.A. signed a production sharing agreement (PSA) awarded by the state-owned National Oil Corporation (NOC) of Libya for onshore and offshore exploration in areas near Tripoli. This is where the Bouri field was discovered offshore at a depth of 8,700 feet (2,700 m) in the Gulf of Gabes by Eni's subsidiary company Agip Oil in 1976. The Bouri field is jointly operated by Agip and NOC.

The first phase of development, costing nearly $2 billion, was completed in 1990. This was immediately followed by commencement of a second development phase which entailed the drilling of 55 new wells and construction of three additional platforms, with production initiating from two oil platforms (DP4 and DP3) in August 1998.

In 1995, the Bouri field was producing nearly 150,000 bbl/d (24,000 m^{3}/d), followed by a sharp decline to 60,000 bbl/d (9,500 m^{3}/d) in 1998. This decline was largely a result of the country's inability to import enhanced oil recovery (EOR) equipment under United Nations sanctions, specifically Security Council Resolution 883 of November 11, 1993, which banned Libya from importing refinery equipment. The situation has improved since the UN Security Council officially lifted sanctions against Libya during September 2003 and foreign investment is expected in the future. In 2006, Eni reported that the Bouri field was producing about 55 kbboe per day.

=== Block NC-41 Facilities ===
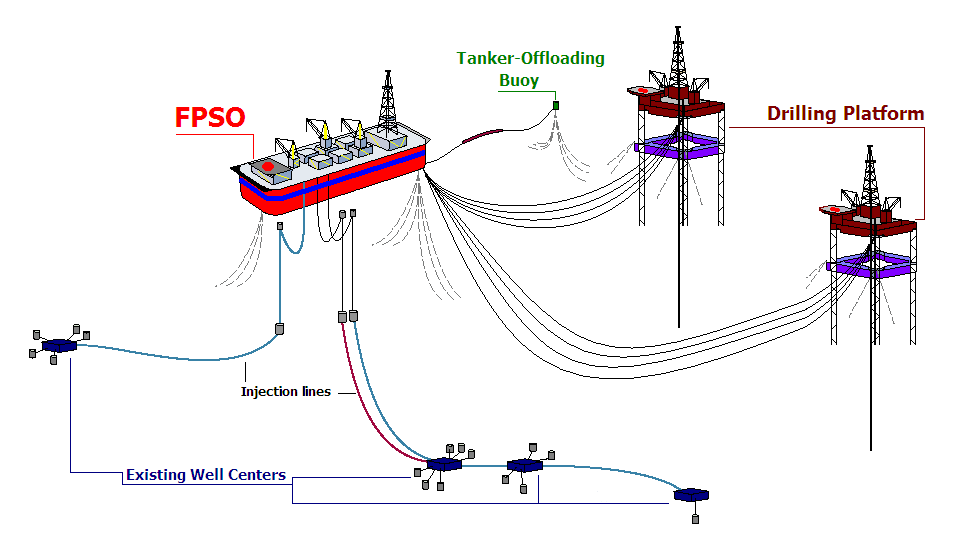
FPSO diagram

Block NC-41 contains three known petroleum reservoirs; one oil reservoir and two gas reservoirs. NC-41 has two production platforms: DP4 and DP3. The latter is tied back to the DP4 platform located 6.5 km northeast. The DP4 platform is permanently moored at a single point to a Floating Storage and Offloading (FSO) tanker with a storage capacity of approximately 1.5 million barrels (240,000 m^{3}). Bouri has three subsea wells independently tied to the DP3 platform by underwater safety valves (USV) mounted on a subsea-deployed skid located 150 meters from the DP3 jacket. The three wells were initially drilled in 1994–1995 and temporarily abandoned until completion in 1998. The subsea trees are an integral protection structure for deflection and protection, preventing the release of oil or gas from wells into the environment and controlling formation fluids. The wells, notable for Hydrogen sulfide, are controlled by chokes on subsea trees. Hydrocarbons are produced by their respective underwater safety valves to the DP3 platform through flexible 4" nominal-diameter flowlines. Topside controls were installed by FMC Technology on the DP3 platform and use a multiplex electro-hydraulic control system with independent production umbilical at each well.

=== Field Development Since 2004 ===
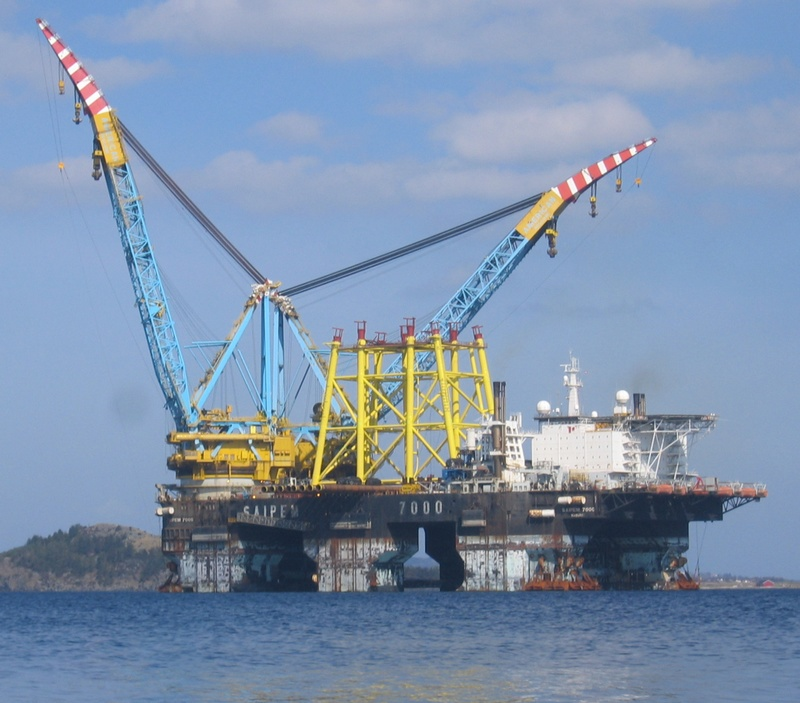
Saipem 7000 is the world's third largest crane vessel.

In 2004, Agip Oil commissioned Saipem S.p.A. for additional development projects related to the Bouri Field. The project carried out through a joint venture between Saipem and Korea's Hyundai Corporation, which fabricated process and utility modules. Apart from drilling modules, designed and with fabrication follow up by Saipem, the contract covered installation of two drilling and production platforms in 160 meter water depths. Overall, twenty-seven modules, ranging in weight from 500 to 1700 tons, and totalling 26,000 tons, were installed. Work conducted on the Bouri Field DP-4 Rig, included; a Removal project: decommissioning and removal of one of the two drilling rigs and associated modules from the DP-4 platform. These operations were carried out utilising the Saipem 7000, which is the world's third largest crane vessel.

== Export Development ==
The Western Libyan Gas Project is a 50-50 joint venture between Eni and NOC which came online in October 2004. This project transports natural gas from Bouri and other Eni fields through the $6.6 billion, 32 inches (0.81 m), 520 km Greenstream underwater pipeline. Currently, 280 billion cubic feet (7.9×10^{9} m^{3}) per year of natural gas is exported from a processing facility at Melitah, on the Libyan coast, via Greenstream to southeastern Sicily. From Sicily, the natural gas flows to the Italian mainland, and then onwards to the rest of Europe. Throughput on the Greenstream line reportedly can be boosted to 385×10^{9} cu ft (1.09×10^{10} m^{3}) per year.

== Djeffara-Pelagian Basin Province: Formation ==
The Bouri field is situated in the Djeffara-Pelagian Basin Province (also known as the "Pelagian Basin"), and produces from the Bou Dabbous-Tertiary TPS. The Province is primarily an offshore region of the Mediterranean, located off eastern Tunisia and northern Libya (northwest of the Sirte Basin), and extending slightly into Italian and Maltese territorial waters. The Pelagian Province contains over 2.3 billion barrels (370,000,000 m^{3}) of known (estimated total recoverable, including cumulative production plus remaining reserves) petroleum liquids; consisting of about 1 billion barrels (160,000,000 m^{3}) of recoverable oil reserves and approximately 17 trillion cubic feet (480 km^{3}) of known natural gas. It is speculated that Tertiary carbonates might contain indigenous hydrocarbon sources, particularly in Eocene rocks (Gir Formation), that could have contributed to the large reserves in Djefarra-Pelagian. In addition to Bouris, other major fields located in the province are the Ashtart and Sidi el Itayem fields.
