= Wadi ash-Shati' =

Coordinates: 27°30′N 14°11′E

The Wadi ash-Shati' (Wadi ash Shatti) is a valley in west-central Libya, arising out of the Sawda Mountains, situated between the towns Wanzarik and Umm al-'Abid in the west and east, respectively. It is known for iron ore and manganese deposits.
