= Gustavo Doreste =

Spanish sailor

Personal information
- Full name: Gustavo Doreste Blanco
- Nationality: Spanish
- Born: 17 January 1960 (age 66) Las Palmas, Spain

Sport
- Sport: Sailing
Medal record
Sailing
Representing Spain
A-Class World Championships
| Gold medal – first place | 2024 Punta Ala | Classic |

Gustavo Doreste Blanco (born 17 January 1960) is a Spanish sailor. He competed in the 470 event at the 1980 Summer Olympics. He also won the 2024 International A-class catamaran world championships in the classic event.
