= Fred Halliday =

Irish writer and academic (1946–2010)

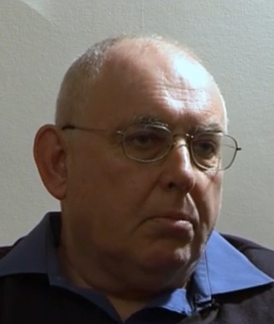
- Halliday in 2009
- Born: 22 February 1946; Dublin, Ireland
- Died: 26 April 2010 (aged 64); Barcelona, Spain
- Occupation: Scholar of international relations

Simon Frederick Peter Halliday FBA (22 February 1946 – 26 April 2010) was an Irish writer and academic specialising in international relations and the Middle East, with particular reference to the Cold War, Iran, and the Arabian Peninsula.

== Biography ==
Born in Dublin, Ireland, in 1946 to an English father, businessman Arthur Halliday, and an Irish mother, Rita (née Finigan), From 1950 to 1953, Halliday attended the Marist School, Dundalk (at that time the primary school for St Mary's College, Dundalk), and Ampleforth College (1953–1963) before going up to Queen's College, Oxford, in 1964 to read Philosophy, Politics and Economics (PPE), graduating in 1967, and then on to the School of Oriental and African Studies (1969) where he earned his MSc in Middle East politics. His doctorate at the London School of Economics (LSE), on the foreign relations of the People's Democratic Republic of Yemen, titled Aspects of South Yemen's foreign policy, 1967-1982, was awarded in 1985, 17 years after he commenced it (Sale 2002). From 1973 to 1985, he was a fellow of the Transnational Institute Amsterdam and Washington. From 1969 to 1983, he served as a member of editorial board of the New Left Review, and worked partially in publishing, in what now is Verso Books. In this capacity, he was one of the editors of Against Method, a major text in philosophy of science by Paul Feyerabend.

In 1983, he took up a teaching position at the LSE, and from 1985 to 2008 was Professor of International Relations there. After recovering from illness in 2002–2003, he was made Montague Burton Professor of International Relations at the LSE in 2005, but in 2008 he retired and became an ICREA research professor at IBEI, the Institut Barcelona d'Estudis Internacionals, in Barcelona where he collaborated intensely with the LSE Alumni Association Spain.

Halliday was also a columnist for openDemocracy and La Vanguardia. In 2002, he was elected Fellow of the British Academy. A memoir assessing his life, work and intellectual achievements appeared in the Proceedings of the British Academy in 2011.

Halliday was a proficient linguist and advocate of the centrality of language to understanding contemporary globalization. Other than English, he was competent in a further eleven languages: Latin, Greek, Catalan, Persian, French, German, Spanish, Italian, Russian, Portuguese and Arabic. From 1965, he travelled widely in the Middle East, visiting every country from Afghanistan to Morocco, and giving lectures in most. He met and interviewed several key Islamic fighters, rebels, and religious leaders and politicians over the years.

Fred Halliday was highly skeptical of the cooperative projects planned between LSE and the Gaddafi Foundation, the charitable foundation led by Saif al-Gaddafi, the son of the Libyan leader Muammar al-Gaddafi. Halliday's views were expressed in a "Note of Dissent" addressed to the LSE Council on 4 October 2009. LSE compiled a list of 1,300 works by Halliday written between 1965 and his death.

== Personal ==
Halliday was formerly married to Maxine Molyneux and they had one son, Alex. His brother is the historian Jon Halliday.

On his concept of 'home': "when he was asked which of his many homes and journeys was his favourite, his reply was unfailingly 'the next one'."

Halliday died in Barcelona on 26 April 2010, aged 64, after a year-long battle with cancer.

== Commemoration ==
The Institut Barcelona d'Estudis Internacionals in Barcelona has named its seminar room after Halliday.

== Books ==
- Edited and introduced Russia, China and the West 1953–1966, by Isaac Deutscher, OUP 1969, Penguin 1970. Serbo-Croat, German translations.
- Translated and introduced Marxism and Philosophy by Karl Korsch, NLB (New Left Books), 1970.
- Arabia without Sultans, Penguin 1974, reprinted 1975, 1979; Italian, Japanese, Persian, Arabic, Turkish translations.
- Iran: Dictatorship and Development, Penguin 1978, reprinted 1979 twice; Japanese, Norwegian, Swedish, German, Spanish, Turkish, Arabic, Persian, Chinese translations.
- Mercenaries in the Persian Gulf, Russell Press, 1979. Persian translation.
- Soviet Policy in the Arc of Crisis, Institute for Policy Studies, Washington, 1981: issued as Threat from the East? Penguin 1982; Japanese, French, Arabic translations.
- The Ethiopian Revolution, with Maxine Molyneux, Verso, London 1982.
- The Making of the Second Cold War, Verso, London 1983, reprinted 1984, 1986, 1988. German, Persian, Spanish, Japanese translations.
- State and Ideology in the Middle East and Pakistan, edited by Fred Halliday and Hamza Alavi, Macmillan, 1988.
- Cold War, Third World, Radius/Hutchinson, 1989. Published in USA as From Kabul to Managua, Pantheon, 1989. Arabic and Japanese translation.
- Revolution and Foreign Policy: the Case of South Yemen, 1967 1987, Cambridge University Press, 1990.
- Arabs in Exile, The Yemeni Community in Britain, I.B. Tauris, 1992. (new version 2010)
- Rethinking International Relations, Macmillan, 1994. Japanese, Spanish and Portuguese translations.
- From Potsdam to Perestroika, Conversations with Cold Warriors, BBC News and Current Affairs Publications, 1995.
- Islam and the Myth of Confrontation, I.B. Tauris, 1996. Arabic, Persian, Turkish, Indonesian, Polish, Spanish translations.
- Revolution and World Politics: The Rise and Fall of the Sixth Great Power, Macmillan, 1999. Turkish translation.
- Nation and Religion in the Middle East, London: Saqi Books, 2000. Arabic translation
- The World at 2000: Perils and Promises, Palgrave, 2001. Greek and Turkish translations.
- Two Hours That Shook the World. 11 September 2001, Causes and Consequences, London: Saqi, 2001. Arabic, Swedish translations.
- The Middle East in International Relations. Power, Politics and Ideology. Cambridge: Cambridge University Press, 2005. Italian, Polish translations.
- 100 Myths About the Middle East. London: Saqi Books, 2005. Arabic, Italian, Turkish, Portuguese and Spanish translations.
- Britain's First Muslims, I.B.Tauris, 2010. (revised, new introduction, of 1992 book)
- Shocked and Awed: How the War on Terror and Jihad have Changed the English Language., London: I.B.Tauris, 2011. (final edits and additions made after his death)
- Caamano in London: The Exile of a Latin American Revolutionary. London: Institute for the Study of the Americas, University of London. 2011.
- Political Journeys: The Open Democracy Essays London: Saqi Books. 2011. (Collection of columns written for openDemocracy between 2004 and 2009)

== Sources ==
=== Interviews ===
- Hans Gutbrod & Rita Solanke, Interview: Fred Halliday on his outlook and academic career, The Beaver, November 15, 1993, LSE library archive issue
- NPR, 13 October 1994: " ...the possible threat of another military showdown in Iraq."
- Peter Snow, Interview: "About attempts to construct an alternative, broad based government to replace the Taliban", BBC, 28 October 2001.
- John Humphrys, Interview: "Will the talks in Germany on the future of Afghanistan lead to a genuinely broad based government?," BBC, 25 November 2001.
- Nadeem Azam, Interview: "Are Islam and the West at Loggerheads?" 1Lit.com, 13 December 2002.
- Jennifer Byrne, Interview, ABC (Australia), 9 April 2002.
- ESRC Society Today, 24 May 2005
- Jonathan Sale, "Passed/failed: Fred Halliday, Academic and Writer. 'My PhD thesis on South Yemen took me 17 years'", The Independent, 15 May 2002.

=== Articles and commentary ===
- Halliday, Fred, "An encounter with Fukuyama", New Left Review, 193. 1992.
- Nadeem Azam, "Are Islam and the West at Loggerheads?" 1Lit.com, 13 December 2002.
- Edward Russell-Walling, "The web of bilateral relations spun anew", Gulf News, 8 November 2001.
- Helena Cobban, "Fred Halliday Misinformed?" Just World News, 2 February 2003.
- Mohammed Almezel, "Full democracy not possible in Gulf region in foreseeable future, says British author", Gulf News, 3 January 2004.
- Fred Halliday, "LSE: and the Qaddafi Foundation: A Dissenting Note", 4 October 2009.
- Danny Postel, "Who Is Responsible? An Interview with Fred Halliday" 23 November 2005.
- John Rose, Purging the demons, Socialist Review 261 (2002).
