= LSE–Gaddafi affair =

2011 British scandal involving a university's links with Gaddafi

The LSE–Gaddafi affair was a scandal in the United Kingdom that occurred as a result of relationship that existed between the London School of Economics (LSE) and the Libyan government and its leader Muammar Gaddafi and his son Saif al-Islam Gaddafi.

The NGO Gaddafi Foundation pledged to donate £1.5 million over five years to a research centre, LSE Global Governance, of which £300k were paid. In addition, LSE Enterprise established a contract worth £2.2 million to train Libyan officials. In 2008, the LSE granted a PhD degree to Saif al-Islam Gaddafi, the son of the Libyan leader, for a dissertation. While a LSE review panel in 2011 found the circumstances adjusted for, allegations continue to circulate that Gaddafi's thesis was ghost-written and/or plagiarised.

In December 2010, Muammar Gaddafi addressed members of the School in a video link-up where he was addressed as "Brother Leader" and received an LSE cap previously given to Nelson Mandela. At the time of the 2011 Libyan Civil War, the relationship between the LSE and the Gaddafi regime and the conduct of individual members of LSE's staff were called into question.

As a result of the scandal, the LSE's Director, Sir Howard Davies, resigned on 3 March 2011, citing "errors of judgement". In a New York Times op-ed piece on 7 March 2011, Roger Cohen wrote, in reference to events that had transpired at the school, "It may be possible to sink to greater depths but right now I can't think how. ...The Arab Spring is also a Western Winter. ...How did we back, use and encourage the brutality of Arab dictators over so many years? To what degree did that cynical encouragement of despots foster the very jihadist rage Western societies sought to curb?"

== LSE and the Monitor Group ==
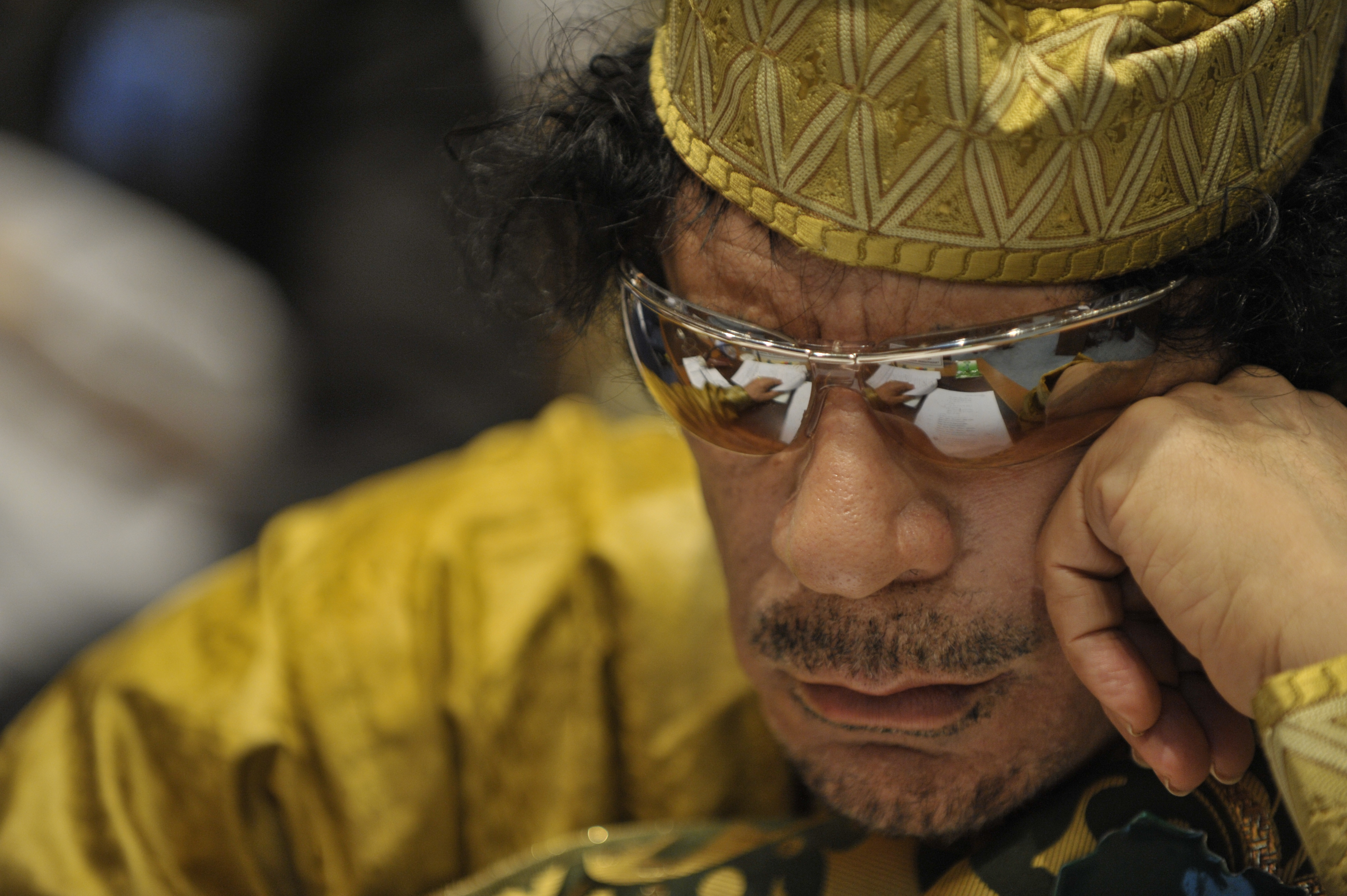
Muammar Gaddafi at the African Union meeting, February 2009.

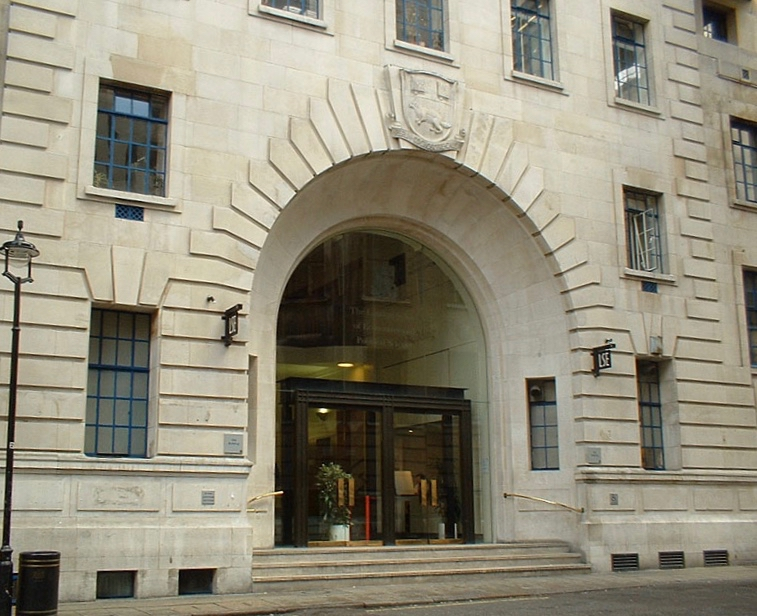
The London School of Economics

In 2004 Libya's government engaged Monitor Group, a Boston-based, Harvard-linked, consultancy firm founded by Harvard Business School professor Mark Fuller, as advisors on matters of public relations. According to leaked documents, Monitor Group received £2 million "in order to enhance international understanding and appreciation of Libya and the contribution it has made and may continue to make to its region and to the world." In addition, "the goal is to introduce Muammar Gaddafi as a thinker and intellectual, independent of his more widely known and very public persona as the Leader of the Revolution in Libya."

A number of Harvard University academics were active within Monitor.

One way to achieve this aim was to recruit prominent journalists and intellectuals who were prepared to travel to Libya and write in positive terms about the country. A prime target were academics associated with the LSE, such as professor Anthony Giddens (Giddens is a Fellow of King's College, Cambridge and is an Emeritus professor at LSE). In 2006 and 2007 the company organized two trips to Libya for Giddens, when the former LSE Director met with Muammar Gaddafi. Giddens has declined to comment on any financial compensation he received on these occasions.

Giddens' first visit to Libya resulted in articles in the New Statesman, El País and La Repubblica, where he argued that Libya had been transformed. In the New Statesman he wrote: "Gaddafi's 'conversion' may have been driven partly by the wish to escape sanctions, but I get the strong sense it is authentic and there is a lot of motive power behind it. Saif Gaddafi is a driving force behind the rehabilitation and potential modernisation of Libya. Gaddafi Sr, however, is authorising these processes." During the second visit, Monitor Group organized a panel of "three thinkers" — Giddens, Gaddafi, and Benjamin Barber, Emeritus professor of Rutgers University, author of the book Jihad vs. McWorld — chaired by the veteran journalist Sir David Frost. Returning from Libya, Giddens wrote about his "chat with the colonel," in the Guardian, concluding that "If Gadafy is sincere about reform, as I think he is, Libya could end up as the Norway of North Africa."

== LSE grants PhD degree to Saif Gaddafi ==
In 2008, Muammar Gaddafi's son, Saif al-Islam Gaddafi, received a PhD from the Department of Philosophy at the LSE with a dissertation entitled "The Role of Civil Society in the Democratization of Global Governance Institutions: From 'Soft Power' to Collective Decision-Making?" His supervisor was Nancy Cartwright, a distinguished philosopher of science, and Alex Voorhoeve, a political philosopher, advised on chapter 4 and the first half of chapter 5. In the text David Held is acknowledged as having "directly advised" the work. One of the two examiners, Lord Meghnad Desai, the founder of LSE Global Governance, had retired from LSE in 2003 and in 2007 was requested by the University of London to examine the thesis of Saif Gaddafi. The external examiner, Anthony McGrew, has collaborated with David Held on seven jointly written or co-edited books. There is some confusion regarding when the degree itself was awarded. The preface of the dissertation says it was submitted in September, 2007; an LSE press office statement says the PhD was "awarded in 2008"; but David Held is on record as saying Saif Gaddafi "received his PhD from the LSE in 2009." What is clear, however, is that the examiners raised concerns at the time of the viva which required revisions to be made and the dissertation to be resubmitted.

In the acknowledgements, Gaddafi thanks "a number of individuals at Monitor Group with whom I worked to design and conduct the NGO Survey which provides empirical data for this thesis." This team consisted of Libyan and foreign academics, led by Professor Omran Bukhres, and included Bruce J. Allyn and Flora Rose, a Cambridge graduate who works for the leader of the House of Lords. When questioned, Monitor Group admitted to having contributed to the dissertation and acknowledged that such assistance had been a mistake. Their aim, they said, had been to "help the Gaddafi regime bring about change." The exact extent of the help provided by the team from Monitor Group is not established, and neither is it clear whether their contribution is in accordance with the rules of the University of London. In addition, it has been claimed that parts of the dissertation have been plagiarized.

"We read the thesis and examined Mr Gaddafi orally for two-and-a-half hours," Meghnad Desai commented, "at no stage did the supervisors or anyone else suggest to us that plagiarism was suspected and we found no reason to do so ourselves." "I can hardly be confident that nobody else helped him," said Nancy Cartwright, "since there's evidence that he lifted bits, but I'm confident that it isn't in the sense done by anybody else start to finish." "We take these accusations seriously, of course," said Voorhoeve, "like any accusations of plagiarism." The claims of plagiarism are to be investigated by the LSE.

According to John Christensen who independently tutored Gaddafi in economics, "Saif lacked the intellectual depth to study at that level, and showed no willingness to read let alone do course work."

== Gaddafi donates money to LSE's North Africa Programme ==
Even before Gaddafi had been examined for his PhD, according to a senior LSE source, the Pro-Directors of the School were "anticipating the solicitation of a donation." However no factual evidence has been produced to support this allegation. The money eventually arrived in June 2009 when the LSE Council accepted a £1.5 million donation from the Gaddafi International Charity and Development Foundation, of which Saif al-Islam Gaddafi was the chairman. This is, said an LSE press release, "a generous donation from an NGO committed to the promotion of civil society and the development of democracy."

The donation was used to create a "North Africa Programme" which would "place Libya within the wider context of the region," and over time narrow its focus to "the specific issues and challenges facing Libya.". George Joffe, a Senior Fellow of the Centre of International Studies at Cambridge University was hired as academic advisor to the North Africa Programme. Professor Joffe was Alia Brahimi's thesis examiner. According to a leaked internal memo, Gaddafi had a direct influence over the research activities of the North Africa Programme. In July 2010, Brahimi met with Gaddafi in Libya and in Greece to "talk over objectives and expectations" and to "agree upon topics for workshops." The memo says that: ""The Programme will work with and consult the Gaddafi Foundation on all aspects of the Programme". In addition, the programme commissioned scholars to write papers on various topics relating to North Africa, in return for fees from £5,000 to £10,000.

== LSE planned to train "Libya's future elite" ==
The Times reported on 3 March 2011 that the LSE had secured a £2.2 million deal to train hundreds of members of Libya's elite. The School agreed to bring 400 "future leaders" from Libya for training in leadership and management, with an additional 250 people due to be trained in Libya itself. The private commercial arrangement was made by Gaddafi.

According to leaked diplomatic cables, American diplomats were told in September 2009 by Libya's National Economic Development Board that they were "co-operating with the U.K. government and the London School of Economics, among other U.K. institutions, on an exchange program to send 400 people to London for leadership and management training." Professor Francis Terry, Dept of Public Management, was academic director for the Libya programme and Julius Sen, LSE Enterprise, the co-director. Professor Terry described his involvement as "a very stimulating experience." According to press reports, references to the program on LSE's website have subsequently been removed.

== Fred Halliday: "A Dissenting Note" ==
On 4 October 2009, Fred Halliday, Emeritus Professor of International Relations at the LSE and the School's leading expert on the Middle East, wrote a memorandum to the LSE Council regarding the proposed cooperation with the Gaddafi Foundation. "I have repeatedly expressed reservations about formal educational and funding links with that country."

While those in favour of accepting the donation argued that "Libya is changing internally," most informed observers agree that while some of the worst excesses for the moment have ceased, the rights of its people are badly protected. Libya "remains a country run by a secretive, erratic and corrupt elite." Since 9/11 the Libyan government has reached compromises with the West on a number of issues, notably the Lockerbie bombing and nuclear weapons. Yet tactical changes in foreign policy are not sufficient for the purposes of evaluating political and academic links. There are also ways in which Libyan foreign policy has not changed: the country continues to call for the destruction of Israel; Muammar Gaddafi recently called for the abolition of Switzerland, and he receives the leader of the Somali pirates operating off the Horn of Africa as honoured guests of state. Moreover, Libya's handling of the Lockerbie bombing "has not been characterised by either consistency or clarity,"

I have in the past, Halliday noted, defended accepting grants from authoritarian regimes such as the Gulf states, "but there should be clear limits on this, depending on the degree of political and human rights abuses perpetrated with them and on their ongoing foreign policy conduct." Whitehall and the City are now happy to do business with Libya, but it does not follow that the LSE should do the same. Responsible leaders throughout the Middle East continue to express reservations regarding Libya, including "its more prominent 'liberal' representatives." We must remember, Halliday concluded, that the "liberal" wing within a regime such as Libya does not have the function of producing change but its role is instead "to reach compromises with internal hard-liners that serve to lessen external pressure." A good case in point are the proposals LSE now is considering. It is, as LSE alumni in positions of responsibility in the region caution, "far too early for the School to take this step."

== Human Rights Watch criticism ==
In 2009, Human Rights Watch was allowed entry to Libya, via Saif al-Islam Gaddafi's non-profit organization in order to gather facts about the human rights situation there. While HRW reported that there were concerns about the "repressive atmosphere," they felt there were signs of "improvement" and Sarah Leah Whitson, director of HRW's Middle East division said that one should not "underestimate the importance of the efforts made so far" by Gaddafi in the realm of human rights in Libya. She also wrote of her official visit that "the real impetus for the transformation rests squarely with a quasi-governmental organization, the Qaddafi Foundation for International Charities and Development" chaired by Gaddafi. She praised Gaddafi for establishing the country's two semi-private newspapers, and said "it is impossible to underestimate the importance of the efforts made so far. Let's hope this spring will last."

In January 2011, HRW criticised other organisations as well as governments that had previously dealt with Gaddafi. HRW Business and Human Rights Director Arvind Ganesan condemned the London School of Economics (LSE) for allowing "abusive and corrupt officials or their families to launder their images in exchange for money". This was later followed by Ganesen saying that "the London School of Economics did not act until Saif al-Islam's father literally began to kill his own people". According to NGO Monitor, this was despite the fact that David Held, Co-Director of LSE Global Governance, was partially influenced by Whitson's remarks regarding her Libyan visit, referring to Saif al-Islam Gaddafi as a reformer.

In February 2011, HRW's Whitson admitted that "Seif Islam in fact abandoned his nascent reform agenda long before."

== LSE, Libya and BP ==
Peter Denis Sutherland, formerly Attorney General of Ireland, European Commissioner, and Head of the World Trade Organisation, finished a 13-year stint as chairman of BP, Europe's largest oil company in early 2010. In Spring 2006 he was appointed Chair of London School of Economics Governors commencing in 2008.

At the LSE council meeting in 2009 Peter Sutherland declared a conflict of interest when the council decided to accept £1.5 million from a charity headed by Muammar Gaddafi. Sutherland's conflict was that BP had signed an oil deal with Libya two years previously, at a time when Sutherland was chairman of the British oil giant. LSE records show Sutherland took no further role in that part of the June 2009 meeting.

== Saif Gaddafi's Ralph Miliband Lecture ==
On 25 May 2010, Saif al-Islam Gaddafi gave a "Ralph Miliband lecture" at the LSE, named after Ralph Miliband, a Marxist scholar and former LSE lecturer. Gaddafi spoke on the topic of "Libya: Past, Present, and Future." In introducing the speaker, professor David Held told the audience that "I have come to know him very well and I must say I have come to like him a great deal." He continued:

Saif is committed to resolving contentious international and domestic issues through dialogue, debate and peaceful negotiations. ... Within his own country Saif has spearheaded efforts to open with Islamic militants about the nature and form of their struggle in order to find ways of bringing them back into the political process. ... His success was based on the use of the language of "soft power," that is, the language of dialogue. ... Throughout this time I've come to know Saif as someone who looks to democracy, civil society and deep liberal values for the core of his inspiration.

Held went on to say that he had many tutorials with Saif and that throughout ongoing dialogue on a range of issues they came to agree on some, and to disagree on much.

On the evening of the lecture, a fight broke out between anti-Gaddafi protesters and pro-Gaddafi supporters. The police were eventually called in to break up the altercation. In a comment on 6 March 2011, David Miliband, Ralph Miliband's elder son and a former UK Foreign Secretary, was critical of the LSE's decision to invite Saif al-Islam Gaddafi:

The Ralph Miliband Programme at the LSE was founded by a former student of my dad's ... The idea of Saif Gaddafi giving a lecture under his name is just horrific to him and horrific to the whole family obviously,

There were approximately 30-40 journalists at the event, however reports on the lecture were largely uncritical and did not raise the issues surrounding the LSE engagement with Libya. David Miliband continued his own association with LSE, giving a lecture at LSE on 8 March, two days after the above comments, where he made reference to the school's early history of economic liberalism combined with social justice.

An open letter by Professor John Keane asks Professor David Held to explain further his links with Libya and to reconsider his reactions. Professor Keane raises several questions, such as: Has the LSE Libya affair not done damage to the scholarly credibility of research programs in the area of democracy? Keane's letter was heavily criticised by those who responded to it in the online magazine in which it was published <http://www.opendemocracy.net/john-keane/libya-intellectuals-and-democracy-open-letter-to-professor-david-held>. Many argued that it was vindictive and overblown. An overview of Halliday and Held - who were both contributors to openDemocracy - with respect to the affair and the larger implications for the independence of UK universities was published by its former editor Fred Halliday, David Held, the LSE and the independence of universities.

In October 2011 Held resigned from his post at the LSE in advance of the publication an independent report into the LSE's links with Libya.

David Held issued a personal statement in reaction to the allegations, saying that "in many discussions and meetings I encouraged the development of [Gaddafi's] reform agenda and subsequently sought to support it through research on the North Africa Programme funded by the Gaddafi International Charity and Development Foundation" at the LSE. In October 2011 Held resigned from his post at the LSE,. The Woolf report examined links between the LSE and the Libyan regime. The inquiry report says it was Professor Held, who "first approached Saif about the possibility of funding his centre for Global Governance in December 2008". This was after the dictator's son had been awarded his PhD by the LSE but before the formal graduation ceremony. The gift offered was of £1.5m in tranches of £300,000 over a five-year period. Periodic payments were to be made annually. The report says: "This was not a one-off donation but the founding of a relationship between the school and the donor, which is not unusual. However, bearing in mind the volatility of the Gaddafi regime, the gift involved a substantial risk because of the length of the relationship." A decision was made that the gift would not come from Saif directly but from "private sector sources". This step "became essential to Professor Held's presentation of the gift. Unless the money could be shown as coming to the foundation from private sources it could have been seen as unacceptable money from the Libyan state."Woolf writes: "I come to no conclusions as to whether there was or would have been excessive influence by the donor over the use of the funds from Saif's foundation. However, what has been made plain is that proper structures of governance are needed to protect academic integrity against influence from the interests of private donors." The funding was accepted despite internal protest. Fred Halliday, a distinguished Middle East expert at the LSE before his death, criticised the donation in a letter that described the country's rulers as a "secretive, erratic and corrupt elite". Held was appointed to the board of the Gaddafi foundation on 28 June 2009, a few days after the gift was discussed and accepted by the university's governing body. Held subsequently resigned from the charity on the LSE council's advice.

Despite institutional and procedural criticism the Woolf report, however, exonerated LSE staff (including David Held) stating that they acted in what they believed to be the best interests of the school. Questions remain, however, about the involvement of elite British academics at the LSE with the Gaddafi regime.

== LSE's video link-up with Gaddafi ==
On 2 December 2010, in a video-link conference hosted by the LSE, Alia Brahimi of LSE Global Governance, introduced Muammar Gaddafi as "Brother Leader," and referred to him as "the world's longest serving national leader."

I will be chairing this on behalf of Howard Davies, the LSE's Director who unfortunately couldn't make it this evening, but who sends the following message, “You are most welcome here Colonel Gaddafi. We wish you had been able to deliver some Libyan weather at the same time” -this is the message from Howard Davies -- “We are pleased to be asked to train Libya officials, and we hope the relationship will continue.”

Gaddafi used the occasion to denounce the Lockerbie bombing as a "fabrication and creation" of Ronald Reagan and Margaret Thatcher, and revealed that the Libyan national, Abdelbaset al-Megrahi, who was convicted of the bombing and imprisoned in Scotland in 2001, but returned to Libya in 2009 on health grounds, was preparing a multi-million pound compensation claim against Britain for false imprisonment and medical neglect. At the end of the lecture, Muammar Gaddafi was given a black baseball cap bearing the bright red LSE logo by Brahimi. "You're in good company," he was assured. "Mandela, Kofi Annan, and Bill Clinton also have them."

== Saif Gaddafi's "Rivers of Blood" speech ==
On 20 February 2011, Saif al-Islam Gaddafi delivered an address to the nation on Libyan state television stating that if no agreement could be found between protesters and the government "thousands of deaths, and rivers of blood will run through Libya". He also insisted that his father remained in charge with the army's backing and would "fight until the last man, the last woman, the last bullet."

On 28 February 2011, CBS News showed a clip of Gaddafi addressing a group of supporters in Tripoli. Holding a Heckler & Koch G36 assault rifle in the air, he told the crowd that "weapons are on the way." A day earlier, Gaddafi had told Christiane Amanpour in an exclusive interview for ABCNews that the Libyan government "didn't use force to stay in power," and asked her to show him "a single attack, a single bomb, a single casualty". On 5 March 2011, he told CNN's Nic Robertson in an interview that his family won't step down: "I am the government. If we would hold tomorrow election my father would win with a big majority". Saif further told CNN that the world should not worry about the "200, 300 even 1000 militia...because now everybody is armed in Libya." In an interview with Benjamin Harvey from Bloomberg on 8 March, Gaddafi said that the crisis in Libya was "a passing cloud. This is an historic opportunity for Libya to become a first-class democratic state.”

The contrast between his appearance in Tripoli in 2011 and his appearance as a guest speaker at LSE, said the BBC, "could not have been more stark."

== Director Howard Davies resigns ==
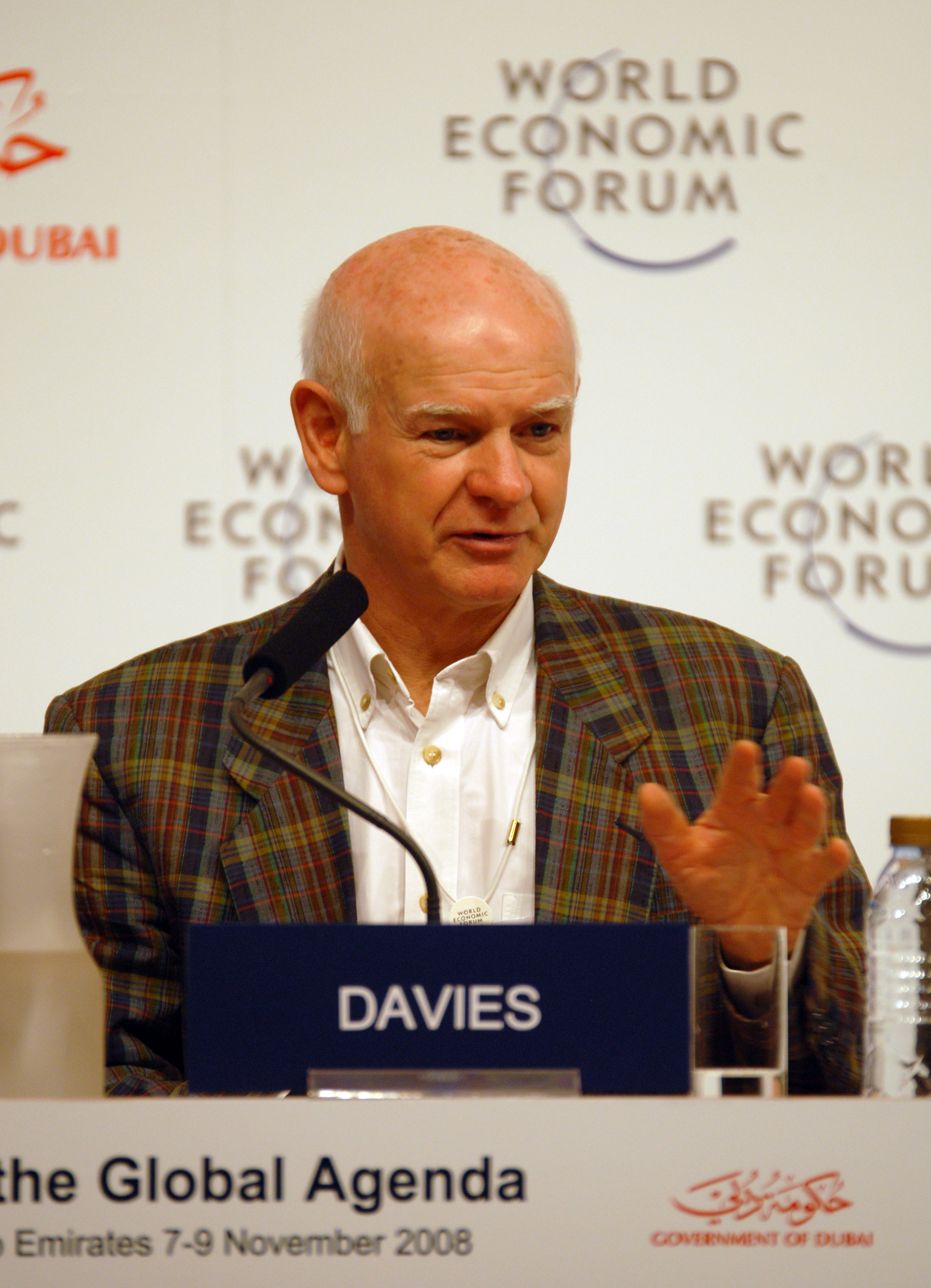
Howard Davies at the Davos Summit 2008

LSE Director Howard Davies resigned on 3 March over the scandal. In a comment Davies said he had left the job because of "two errors of judgment": 1) his advice that a donation from Gaddafi's foundation was acceptable, and 2) his decision to act as a financial adviser to the Libyan government. Davies acknowledged in his resignation letter that it would “be right for me to step down, even though I know that this will cause difficulty for the institution I have come to love.” He added, “The short point is that I am responsible for the school’s reputation, and that has suffered.”

In a statement the LSE's Board of Governors accepted Howard's resignation with "great regret." Raheem Kassam, from the 'Student Rights' group, called for the Libyan money to be donated to a charity to assist Gaddafi's victims.

Colin Talbot, who holds a PhD degree from the LSE and is currently the Chair of Public Policy and Management at Manchester Business School, told UTv News on 4 March 2011 that Howard Davies should not be blamed for carrying out what amounted to "British diplomatic strategy". Talbot, who also taught on the LSE's Libya program further said that Davies was not the only person responsible for tarnishing the university's reputation, because the British government had encouraged Davies to establish close ties to the Gaddafi family.

The LSE said in a statement on 21 February 2011, that its engagement with the Libyan authorities has already finished or has been stopped following recent events in the country. The School said no more of the £1.5m donation would be accepted. About half of the £300,000 already accepted had been spent and the LSE Council would next consider what to do with the remaining funds, taking into account the views of LSE students.

On 17 March 2011, Professor Judith Rees was appointed interim- director. Reese was pro director of the School from 1998 to 2004, and is currently director of the Grantham Research Institute on Climate Change and the Environment at LSE.

== LSE reactions ==
=== Students ===
Several protest actions were undertaken by LSE students in the response to the affair, including sit-ins and demonstrations. The students have insisted that LSE repay the donation from Gaddafi's foundation and revoke Gaddafi's status as LSE alumnus. The donation had originally been welcomed by the then-General Secretary of LSE Students Union, Aled Fisher, in June 2009, as "exactly the kind of donation" the School should be encouraging." Fisher said he was "taken out of context" and LSE officials "withheld pertinent facts about Saif Gaddafi’s role in the state, which... would have made Council and I look differently on the issue," with Charlotte Gerada, General Secretary in 2011, stating it was "unacceptable" that LSE "used" Fisher "as a scapegoat."

In an on-line petition, present and former LSE students urged the School to revoke Gaddafi's status as alumnus and to cease all cooperation with the Libyan regime. "We were shocked to find out that the LSE has accepted a £1.5 million donation from the Gaddafi International Charity and Development Foundation; an NGO headed by Gaddafi's son, Saif al-Islam Gaddafi.... We are astonished that the donation was accepted in the first place."

=== Faculty ===
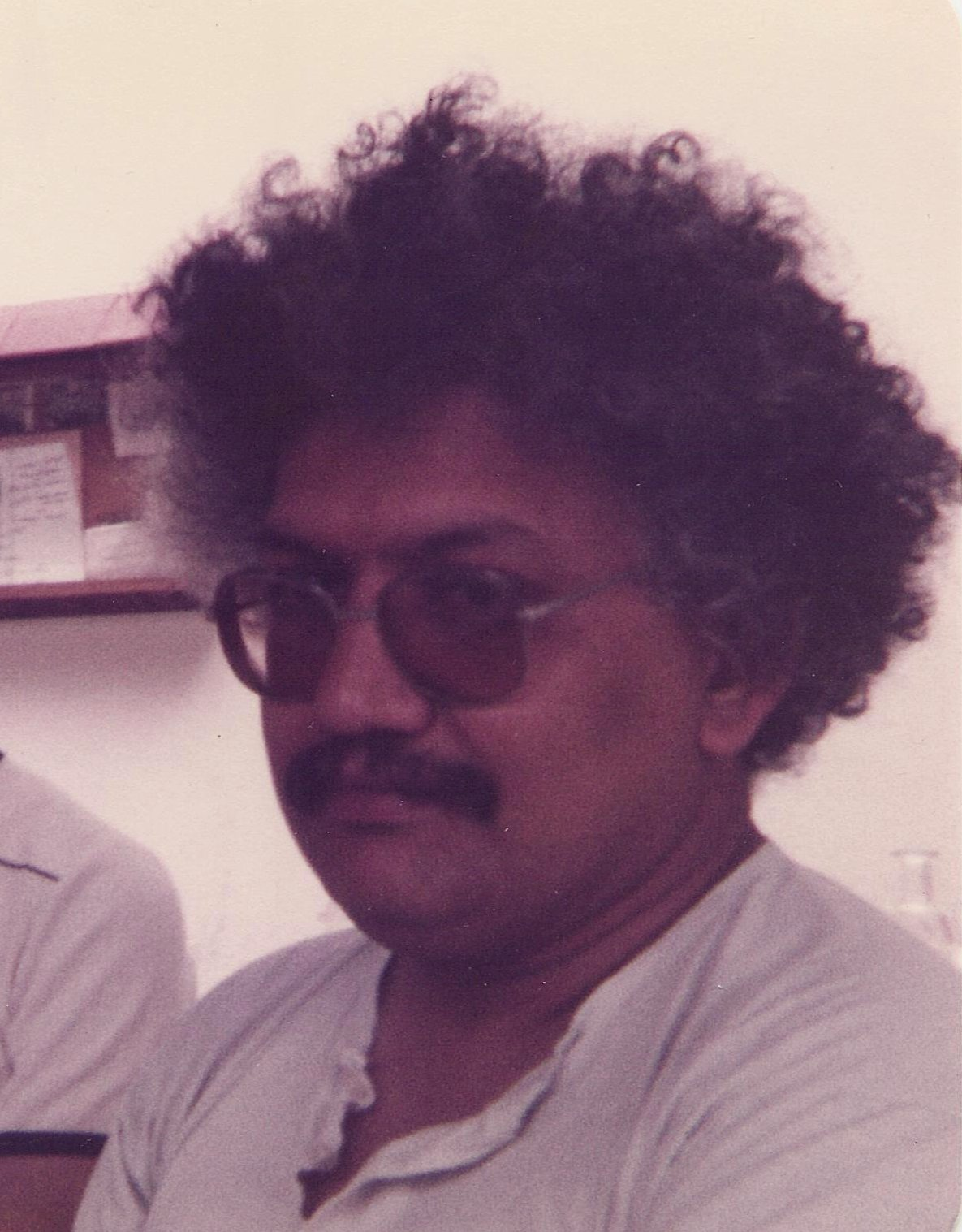
Lord Desai, co-founder, LSE Global Governance

Professor Meghnad Desai, defended LSE's actions, arguing that "Academic research needs money — Rockefeller was a robber baron once, but we take his money". "It was only after bullets started flying in Libya that Saif Gaddafi was found to have cheated. Nor had anyone until then objected that the LSE had received a donation from Saif Gaddafi's Foundation."

Professor David Held issued a statement saying that "in many discussions and meetings I encouraged the development of Gaddafi's reform agenda and subsequently sought to support it through research on the North Africa Programme funded by the Gaddafi International Charity and Development Foundation."

Saif Gaddafi, said Alex Voorhoeve, "seemed genuinely moved by the desire to study democratic ideals and practice and my colleagues had therefore hoped he would have a liberalizing influence on the Libyan regime. ... I had hoped that at such a crucial moment, he would defend the democratic ideals that he wrote about in his thesis.

These reactions were echoed by Alia Brahimi, who claimed to be "tremendously surprised" by Saif Gaddafi's "Rivers of Blood Speech." Saif Gaddafi, she said, had been a reformer for many years but now "seemed to be backpeddling". "I’ve got nothing to apologise for. Saif told me he was keen that democratic reform should happen soon in Libya."

Henning Mayer, a former employee of David Held, defended the decision to accept Gaddafi's money saying it was made based on information available at the time.

In a statement Fred Halliday's wife said she recalled that her late husband had been opposed to accepting Gaddafi as a student.

The Financial Times reported on 3 March 2011, that the LSE had started to edit official university websites in an attempt to "remove references to Libyan links from its academics’ workplace biographies".

Shami Chakrabarti, director of Liberty had also faced criticism over the affair, due to her position on the governing council of LSE. The "Students Rights" organisation accused her of hypocrisy "for being "the director of a human rights group while legitimizing murderous regimes". She later admitted her embarrassment and shame about the Gaddafi affair and finally in April 2013 Chakrabarti's spokesman confirmed that she had severed all links with The LSE.

== Lord Woolf Inquiry ==
On 3 March 2011, LSE announced that they had set up an independent external inquiry into the School's relationship with the Libyan regime, to be conducted by the former lord chief justice Harry Woolf. Lord Woolf is to conduct

An independent inquiry to establish the full facts of the School’s links with Libya, whether there have been errors made, and to establish clear guidelines for international donations to and links with the School. Lord Woolf is to make recommendations to the LSE Council as soon as possible. He is to have total discretion as to how he conducts the inquiry, and as to the matters on which he is to report.

The Woolf report was published on 30 November 2011. Woolf summarised his central conclusion as

The School established, in an incremental and piecemeal fashion, a relationship with Libya. Before a global company embarks upon a relationship with a foreign partner, a due diligence assessment should be conducted. No similar exercise took place in this case. The links were allowed to grow, unchecked and to a degree unnoticed, until their effect was overwhelming. In October 2009, the LSE’s Council resolved that the links should be monitored carefully in future. That monitoring came too late. By October 2009 the relationship with Libya had been well established. In addition, the history of the developing connection between the LSE and Libya has exposed a disconcerting number of failures in communication and governance within the School. The errors which I detail in the remaining chapters of this Report exceed those that should have occurred in an institution of the LSE’s distinction. The pattern is such that I am driven to the central conclusion that there were shortcomings in the governance structure and management at the LSE.

== Other universities with Libyan links ==
On 19 May 2009, the French-language journal Jeune Afrique published an investigative report on the Gaddafi family's public relations campaign set up by Monitor. Titled 'Gaddafi: Mirror, Mirror, Tell Me Who is the Most Handsome' the article detailed how the Monitor group had been organizing visits to Libya by leading academics from US-and UK-based universities in order to meet Gaddafi the 'thinker and intellectual'. In addition to Michael Porter from the Harvard Business School, Francis Fukuyama, Professor of International Political Economy at Johns Hopkins University, lobbyist Richard Perle, as well as Robert Putnam from Harvard University traveled to Tripoli to meet Gaddafi. All the meetings had been organized by the Monitor group.

In the context of the scandal over LSE's Libya connections, it emerged that also Michigan State University had established a program to train future Libyan leaders. Moussa Koussa, Libya's foreign minister and the second most powerful man in Libya after the Gaddafi family received a master's degree in Sociology from Michigan State in 1978.

In April 2011, the Guardian claimed that the University of St Andrews Centre for Syrian Studies received funding from businessman Ayman Asfari who was alleged to have links to the Syrian government led by Bashar al-Assad. However, it later transpired that Mr Asfari had no links to the Syrian government and the Guardian issued an apology to him in print in July; no such apology was issued to the University.
