= Howard Davies (economist) =

British economist and author

Sir Howard Davies
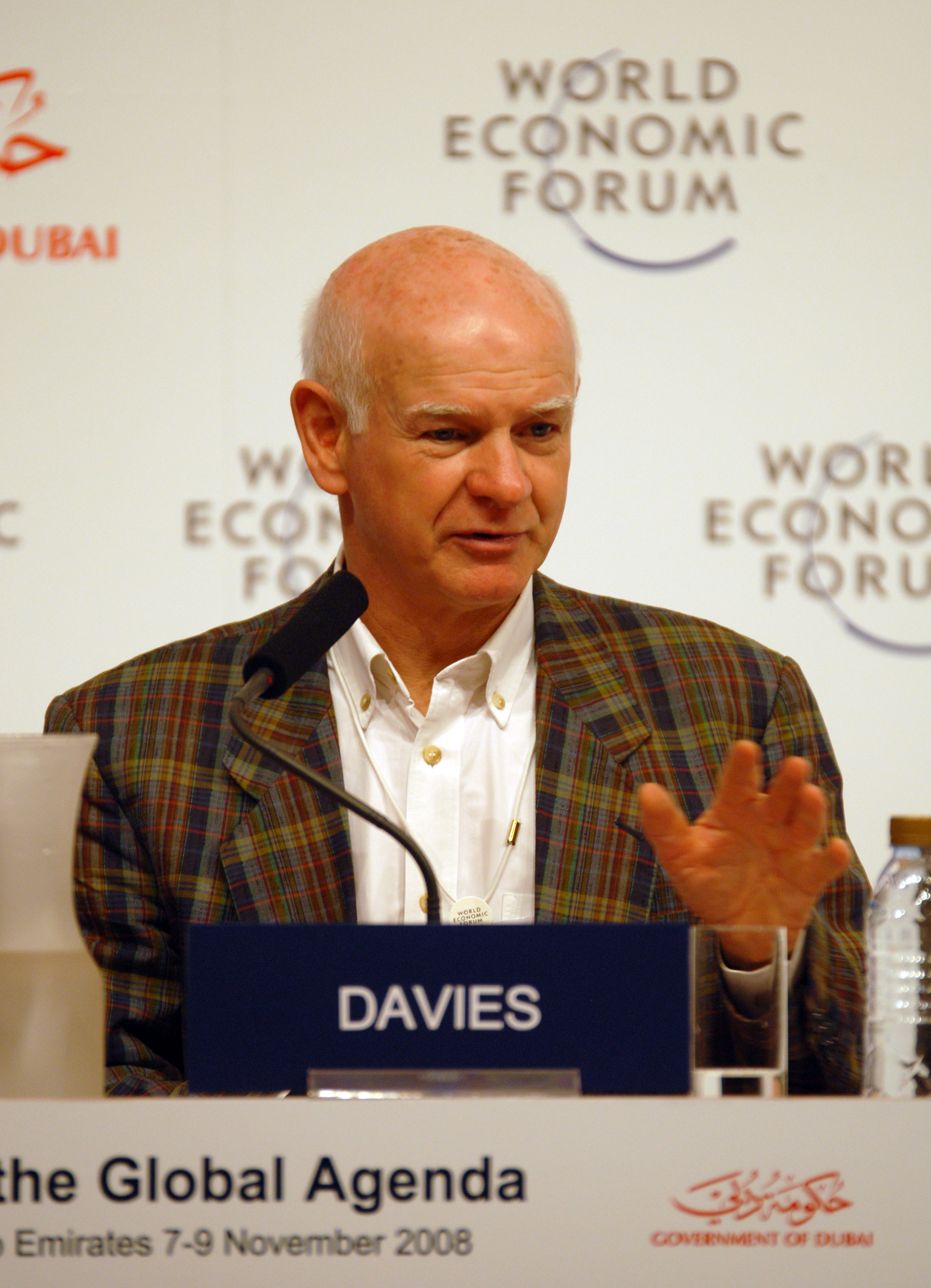
- Davies in 2008

Chairman of NatWest Group
- Incumbent
- Assumed office 1 September 2015

Personal details
- Born: 12 February 1951 (age 75) Prestbury, Cheshire, England
- Spouse: Prue Keely
- Children: 2
- Education: Memorial University; Merton College, Oxford; Stanford Business School

Sir Howard John Davies (born 12 February 1951) is a British historian and author, who was the chairman of NatWest Group and the former director of the London School of Economics.

He was the first chairman of the Financial Services Authority. Davies was chairman of the Phoenix Group and, until July 2015, chaired the UK Airports Commission. In February 2015, he was appointed chairman of The Royal Bank of Scotland Group, taking up the role from September 2015. RBS Group was renamed NatWest Group in 2020. In 2023, he came under scrutiny about the Nigel Farage Coutts bank scandal. In April 2024 he stepped down as Chairman of NatWest Group on 15 April 2024, concluding his tenure after nearly nine years in the role.

Since 2011 he has been a professor at the Paris School of International Affairs, part of Sciences Po. He teaches master's courses on financial regulation and central banking.

== Early life ==
Howard Davies born on 12 February 1951 in Prestbury, Cheshire, England, and was raised in Blackley, Manchester.

He was educated at Bowker Vale County Primary School and The Manchester Grammar School, where he was the founder editor of The Mancunian, before going as an exchange student to the Memorial University of Newfoundland and to Merton College, University of Oxford, where he gained a Master of Arts degree in modern history and modern languages. He edited the Cherwell newspaper in 1972.

On graduation from Oxford he joined the Foreign and Commonwealth Office in London, working the Western European Department on bilateral relations with Scandinavia, Italy, Austria and the Holy See. In 1974 he became Private Secretary To HM Ambassador in Paris, working for Sir Edward Tomkins and Sir Nicholas Henderson. From 1976 he was on secondment to HM Treasury, where he worked on Nationalised Industry Policy and Aerospace finding (civil and military). He was responsible for the UK participation in the Concorde, Airbus and Tornado programmes, in particular. In 1979 he was awarded a Harkness Fellowship to attend the Stanford Graduate School of Business in California where he obtained a Master of Science degree in management sciences. At HM Treasury, he held the post of principal for monetary policy.

== Career ==
Davies was employed by McKinsey & Company from 1982 to 1987. From 1985 to 1986 he was special adviser to Chancellor of the Exchequer Nigel Lawson. From 1987 to 1992 he was Controller of the Audit Commission. In 1992 he was appointed director general of the Confederation of British Industry, a position he held until 1995, when he was appointed Deputy Governor of the Bank of England. In 1997 Davies was appointed Executive Chairman of the newly established Financial Services Authority, regulating the whole of the UK financial services industry, serving until 2003.

From 2003 to 2011 Davies was director of the London School of Economics and Political Science. He stepped down from the position on 3 March 2011 following concern over the institution's decision to accept funding from a foundation controlled by the Libyan dictator Muammar Gaddafi's son, Saif, in the LSE–Gaddafi affair.

Davies was a non-executive director of GKN between 1989 and 1995, and a member of the international advisory board of National Westminster Bank from 1991 to 1995. From 1995 to 2004 he was founder Chairman of Employers Forum on Age, a body formed to oppose ageism at work. From 2002 to 2010 he was a trustee of the Tate Gallery (where he was interim chair 2008–09), and was a member of the governing body of the Royal Academy of Music from 2004 to 2013. He is patron of Working Families, a campaigning charity which supports the rights of parents in the workplace. In 2004 he was elected to an Honorary Fellowship of Merton College, Oxford and became an independent director of Morgan Stanley, where he chaired the board's risk committee. From 2006 to 2010, Davies was a non-executive director of Paternoster Ltd. Since 2003, he has held membership in the International Advisory Committee of the China Banking and Insurance Regulatory Commission, and, since 2012, has chaired the International Advisory Committee of the China Securities Regulatory Commission. He became chairman of the Royal Bank of Scotland Group in February 2015.

In 2009 Davies was appointed as adviser to the Investment Strategy Committee of GIC Private Limited, formerly known as Government of Singapore Investment Corporation. Two years later he joined its international advisory board. He resigned from both positions in September 2012, on appointment to the chair of the Airports Commission (GIC Private Limited is a part owner of Heathrow). In 2010 he became a non-executive director of Prudential plc, and chair of the Risk Committee, a role he performed until May 2020. In 2011 he joined the Regulatory Advisory Council of Millennium LLP in New York. Also in 2011, he joined the board of the Royal National Theatre, where he was chairman of the Finance Committee for 4 years. From 2012 to 2015 Davies was a member of the advisory board of the SWIFT Institute. Davies is a council member of the Asian Bureau of Finance and Economic Research in Singapore.

In May 2022, Davies described Brexit as a "significant mistake".

In November 2022, as Chairman of NatWest Group, Davies reportedly told staff that he had been "embarrassed" during a meeting with the IMF after Liz Truss and Kwasi Kwarteng released a mini-budget.

In July 2023, as chairman of NatWest Group, Davies expressed confidence in his chief executive, Dame Alison Rose, who had breached client confidentiality in discussing the bank account of Nigel Farage with a BBC reporter. Shortly after expressing that confidence, Rose was forced to resign when the Prime Minister, Rishi Sunak, and others in Government expressed concern at her apparent gross misconduct. Rose's resignation led to calls for Davies to resign. On 27 July, Sunak refused to endorse Davies to stay in the role. He did not resign, was supported by shareholders, and left NatWest in April 2025 at the end of his nine year term.

In January 2024, Davies was the subject of controversy following his comment that it was "not that difficult" to buy a house in the UK.

Davies stepped down as chairman of NatWest Group on 15 April 2024, concluding his tenure after nearly nine years in the role. He had previously announced his intention to retire by July 2024, aligning with the UK Corporate Governance Code's recommendation of a maximum nine-year tenure for board chairs.

== Other ==
Davies chaired the judges of the Man Booker Prize for fiction in 2007. He was appointed chairman of the trustees of the London Library in November 2015.

He was a character in the David Hare play The Power of Yes which premiered at the London National Theatre in October 2009.

== Honours ==
Davies was appointed a Knight Bachelor in 2000.

== Books ==
- Davies, Howard (2006). Chancellors' Tales : Managing the British Economy. Cambridge: Polity Press. ISBN 978-0-7456-3885-0.
- ———————; Green, David (2008). Global Financial Regulation: The Essential Guide. Cambridge: Polity Press. ISBN 978-0-7456-4349-6.
- ———————; Green, David (2010). Banking on the Future: The Fall and Rise of Central Banking. Princeton: Princeton University Press. ISBN 978-0-691-13864-0.
- ——————— (2010). The Financial Crisis: Who Is To Blame?. Cambridge: Polity Press. ISBN 978-0-7456-5164-4.
- ——————— (2015). Can Financial Markets Be Controlled?. Cambridge: Polity Press. ISBN 978-0-7456-8830-5.
- ———————-(2022). The Chancellors: steering the British economy in crisis times. Cambridge: Polity Press. ISBN 978-1-5095-4953-5

Davies is a columnist for Project Syndicate.

== Personal life ==
Davies is married to Prue Keely, and has two sons.

He is a supporter of Manchester City Football Club and the Lancashire County Cricket Club. He plays cricket for Barnes Common cricket club.

Academic offices
Preceded by Anthony Giddens	Director of the London School of Economics; 2003–2011	Succeeded by Judith Rees
Business positions
Preceded by John Banham	Director of the Confederation of British Industry; 1992–1995	Succeeded by Adair Turner
