= Imadec Executive Education =

Business training provider in Vienna, Austria

Coordinates: 48°11′9.24″N 16°21′45.58″E

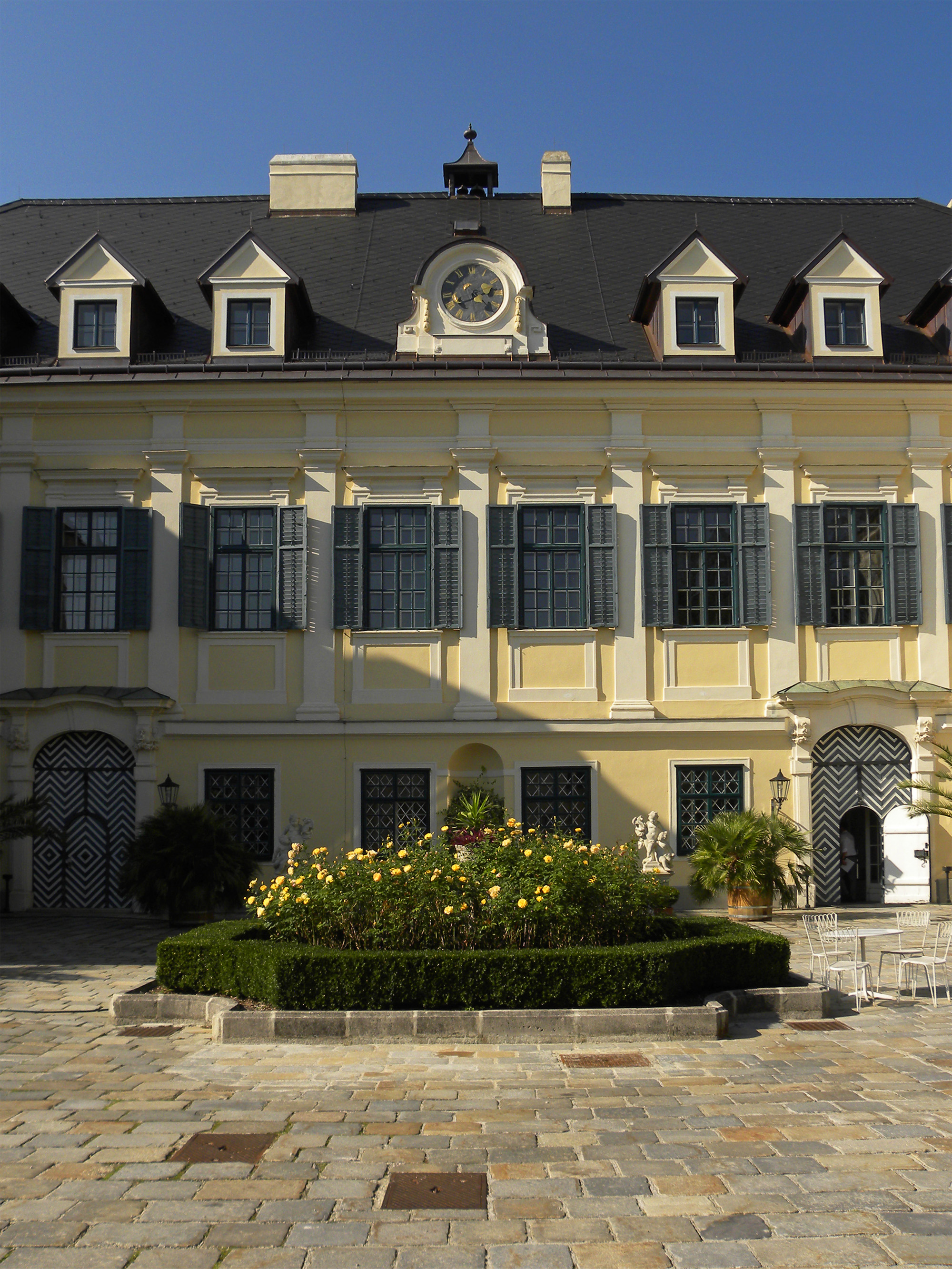
Schloss Laudon, the baroque water castle in the outskirts of Vienna that Imadec was operating out of during its years as an accredited private university

Imadec Executive Education GmbH is a business training provider in Vienna, Austria. The company briefly gained accreditation as a for-profit private university in 2001, albeit under dubious circumstances. The accreditation was rescinded in 2006 as a result of compliance issues and persistent diploma mill allegations. Imadec was forced into bankruptcy proceedings by its creditors in 2010 but was permitted to restructure under court supervision. The company continues to operate and is currently offering negotiation and management seminars.

== History ==
Imadec was founded in 1991 as the International Management Development Consulting GmbH.

Founder and director was Christian Joksch, an Austrian insurance manager and sometime lecturer.

From 1991 to 1996, the company operated as a consulting business.

=== California State partnership ===
In 1996, Imadec secured a partnership with the California State University, Hayward (CSUH). Acting as an overseas business program subsidiary of the university and supervised by university personnel on location in Vienna, Imadec reinvented itself as a for-profit business school and began offering an Executive MBA program. The program received accreditation from the FIBAA. Also starting in 1996 the International Gary S. Becker Prize, a prize for scholarly excellence donated and granted by Gary Becker together with a committee of international economists and business executives, was awarded by Imadec.

The partnership collapsed in August 2002. According to Jay Tontz, Dean of the CSUH Department of Business and Economics, the university decided to end the relationship because the venture had failed to turn any profit, even though the university's five other overseas MBA programs were making healthy amounts of money. The contract stipulated profit sharing as opposed to the more conventional revenue sharing; Imadec claimed it was barely breaking even but refused to either cut costs or agree to a revenue sharing arrangement. An additional problem, according to CSUH faculty, was "Imadec's failure to make timely payments" regarding salaries and expenses the company owed. According to Joksch, Imadec was canceling the contract because Kurt Leube, the partnership's academic director, had been misrepresenting his academic credentials. Leube, Joksch alleged, had been fraudulently claiming to hold a PhD in Economics that he did not in fact possess. Former Imadec faculty described Joksch's accusations as "ridiculous". Joksch had been well aware of Leube's lack of a doctorate; he had hired Leube on the strength of Leube's enthusiastic adherence to the Austrian School and his apprenticeship under Friedrich Hayek.

=== Private university ===
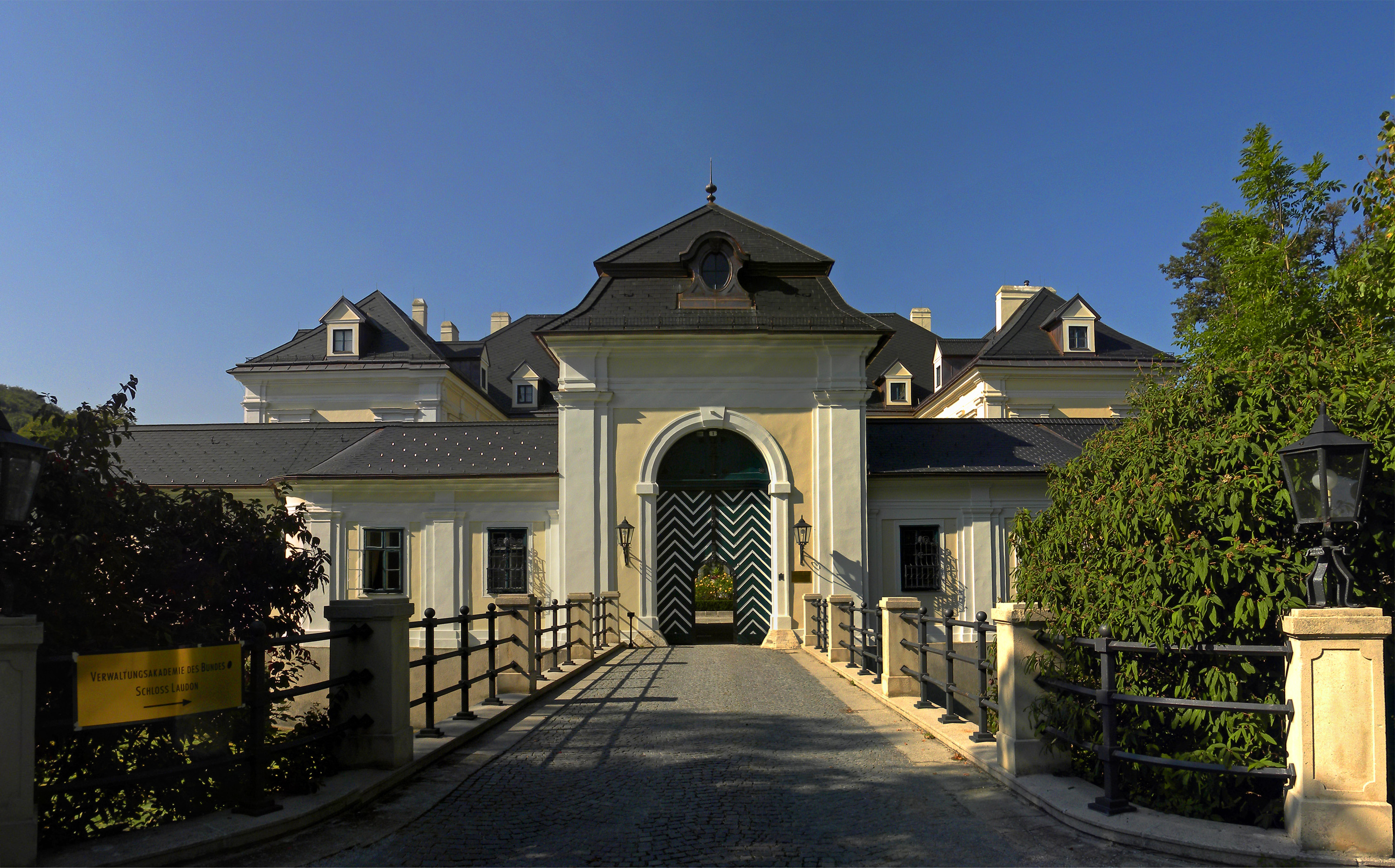
Schloss Laudon main entrance

In May 1999, Joksch ran for the European Parliament on a Freedom Party ticket. Although he did not win a seat, the political connections he established paid off when the Freedom Party gained government responsibility and cabinet positions following the October 1999 Austrian legislative election. As a part of its general program of deregulation and liberalization, the new cabinet paved the way for the establishment of private universities in Austria. Joksch had been lobbying for legislation allowing private universities for years and appears to have played a major role in convincing the cabinet to sponsor the relevant statute. In fact, one of his employees was involved in drafting the statute. When the Accreditation Council established by the new act proved hesitant to accredit Imadec, Joksch's political allies were able and willing to bring considerable pressure to bear.

Imadec was accredited effective January 2001.

The new university mocked its older siblings for what it saw as their antiquated teaching methods and their fatuous insistence on maintaining research libraries. Imadec enthusiastically embraced, however, the traditional material trappings of academia. The school took up residence in the ersatz Ivy League ambience of Schloss Laudon, a baroque water castle in the outskirts of Vienna. Web sites, brochures, and commercials featured Christian Joksch and others wearing richly adorned academic robes and flamboyant medallion chains, a conspicuous departure from the comparatively sober comportment of most of Austria's other institutions of higher learning. Almost immediately, Imadec also began to refer to itself as an "elite" institution.

With the heightened profile came heightened scrutiny, which Imadec did not weather well. Very soon, the institution was dogged by accusations of low standards and academic irregularities going back years. A number of politicians, political operatives, and socialites were managing to earn degrees without spending any significant amount of time in either classrooms or libraries. Notable cases include:

- Theresia Zierler, Freedom Party general secretary
- Ralph Vallon, Freedom Party communications director
- Gerald Mikscha, long-time personal assistant to Jörg Haider
- Sylvia Papházy, Freedom Party MP and alleged life partner of Joksch at the time
- Werner Amon, MP for the Austrian People's Party, the Freedom Party's coalition partner at the time. Amon was awarded an MBA even though he had never completed his secondary education and was therefore technically ineligible to enroll. Amon was not just a sitting member of parliament during his time as an Imadec MBA student, he also served on the parliamentary Science Advisory Committee and held the additional side job of being Imadec's director of resource development.
- Saif al-Islam Gaddafi, friend of Haider's and fixture of the local party scene. The son of the Libyan dictator managed to earn an Imadec MBA in just twenty months, in spite of his busy social calendar and in spite of being fully fluent in neither English nor German. There is evidence that lecturers were falsifying at least some of his written exams on his behalf.
- Karl von Habsburg, son of Otto von Habsburg, Honorary President of Imadec at the time. Karl was known for his affable disposition but not for his scholarly accomplishment. Once at Imadec, Karl earned three separate master's degrees in the space of just five years, despite his increasingly demanding social obligations as the acting head, and later head, of the House of Habsburg. Karl's MBA, MLE, and LL.M. featured proudly in Imadec PR publications.

Imadec became a subject of concern for the Science Advisory Committee. The general impression in the committee, two members went on record stating, was that Imadec was essentially simply selling its degrees and only barely bothered to pretend otherwise. When Imadec's accreditation came up for review in 2005, the national Accreditation Council refused renewal, citing numerous issues in unusually forceful language. The accreditation expired in early 2006. The school petitioned for a renewal of its accreditation in August 2006 but was rejected again. The council once more cited issues with quality assurance, academic staff structure, and financial backing.

=== Pretend private university ===
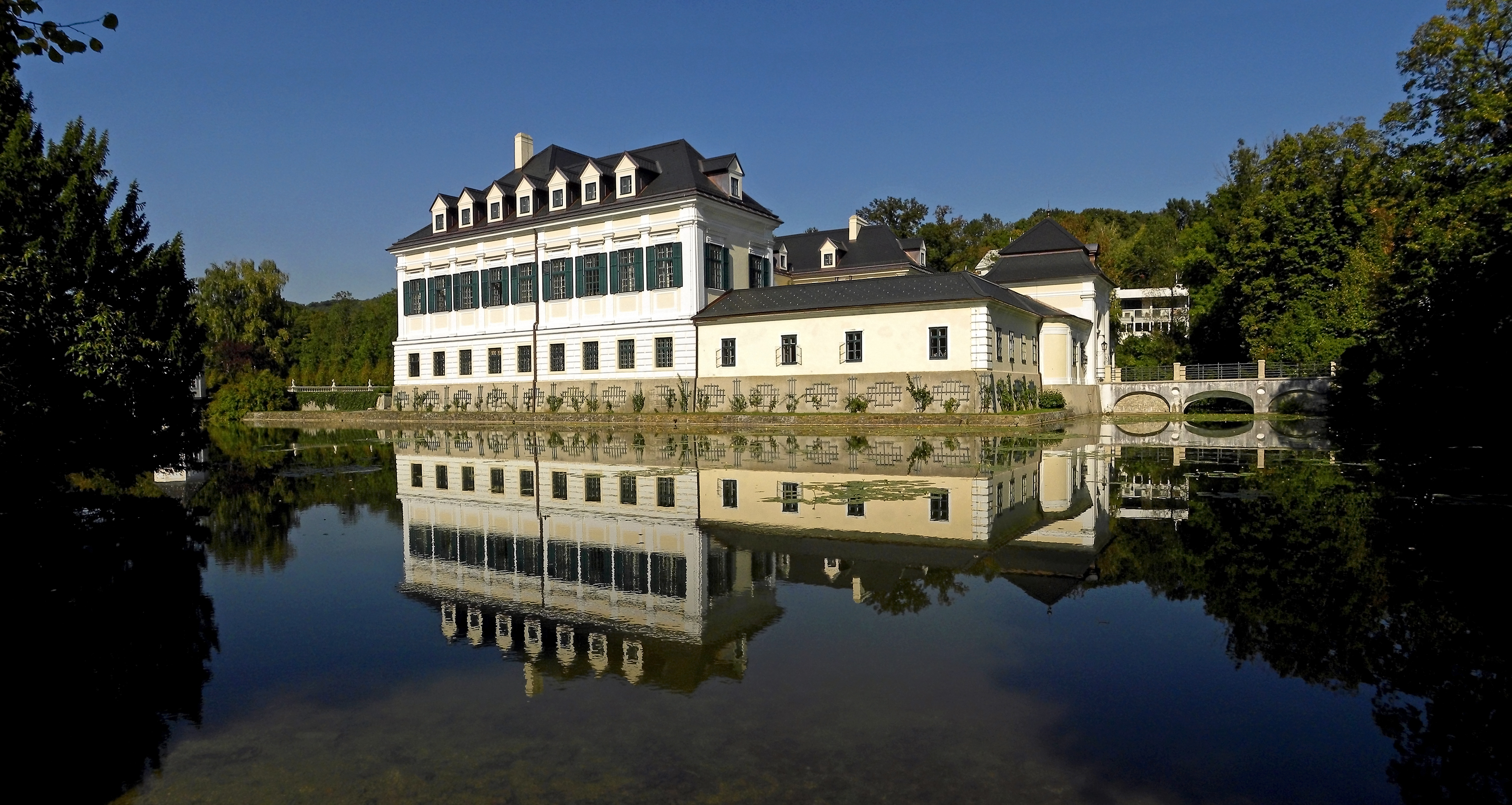
Schloss Laudon as it appeared in Imadec sales brochures and PR material

At the same time, Imadec received permission to advertise its educational programs as "university-level curricula" (German: "Lehrgänge universitären Characters") and to award symbolic degrees to students successfully completing them. The permission appears to have been a personal favor to Joksch from Elisabeth Gehrer, the outgoing minister of education at the time.

Under the unique and somewhat experimental statutory framework of the time, Imadec could legally claim that its degrees were "academic" degrees. In fact, Imadec could legally advertise its degrees as "master's" degrees even though they were distinct from actual master's degrees in several respects. Imadec made full use of the legal loopholes at its disposal and continued to award "master's" degrees for another five years. Imadec even tried to continue using the word "university" as part of its registered company name. Petitioned by the Accreditation Council, the Vienna Commercial Court ordered the company name struck from the rolls in 2007. Ignoring the order, Joksch continued to refer to his company as a "university" for several more years, apparently with impunity.

Austria's actual universities quickly discovered that the deluge of substandard "master's" degrees pouring out of institutions such as Imadec threatened the country's credibility in the market. By 2007, consumer protection agencies were declaring themselves concerned. By 2011, there were 75 separate "university-level" training providers in Austria, and universities were heavily lobbying the legislature to quell the flood. It had become obvious that Austria's private tertiary education sector had acquired a questionable reputation. Encumbered by the sectors's poor prestige, private universities and "university-level" training providers were experiencing financial difficulties. Imadec was repeatedly cited as one of the reasons.

Parliament ended the experiment, effective 2012.

=== Illegal conferment of honorary degrees ===
An important part of Imadec's marketing efforts was its generosity in awarding honorary degrees and other distinctions to politicians, prominent bankers, and celebrities.

Notable known recipients include:

- Siegbert Alber, Honorary LL.D.
- Peter Blaker, Baron Blaker, Honorary Citizen
- Wim Duisenberg, Honorary DBA
- Franz Fischler, Honorary Citizen
- Ernst Fuchs, Honorary Citizen
- Otto von Habsburg, Honorary President
- Hans Hass, Honorary Citizen
- Claus Hipp, Honorary Senator
- Alexandre Lamfalussy, Honorary DBA
- Helmut List, Honorary Senator
- Heinrich Neisser, Honorary Citizen
- Maria Schaumayer, Honorary Citizen
- Arnold Schwarzenegger, Honorary DBA
- Gerhard Swarovski, Honorary Senator
- Max Turnauer, Honorary Senator
- Josefina Vázquez Mota, Honorary Citizen
- Franz Vranitzky, Honorary DBA
- Andrew Young, Honorary Citizen

All of these honors were void and their conferments illegal. Institutions that could not award regular doctorates could not award honorary doctorates either, and private universities could not award any honors at all. In 2005, Joksch was charged before the Administrative Court, convicted, and fined. Imadec honorary distinctions, the verdict confirmed, were worthless. Joksch ignored the verdict and continued to hand out honorary degrees, most notably to Vicente Fox. The former president of Mexico holds an honorary doctorate of law from Imadec, awarded in 2011.

=== Bankruptcy petition ===
On June 18, 2010, bankruptcy proceedings were initiated against Imadec by one of its creditors before the Vienna Commercial Court. On August 26, 2010, the court accepted a restructuring plan that required Imadec to fully satisfy all creditors within two years' time.

== Current activity ==
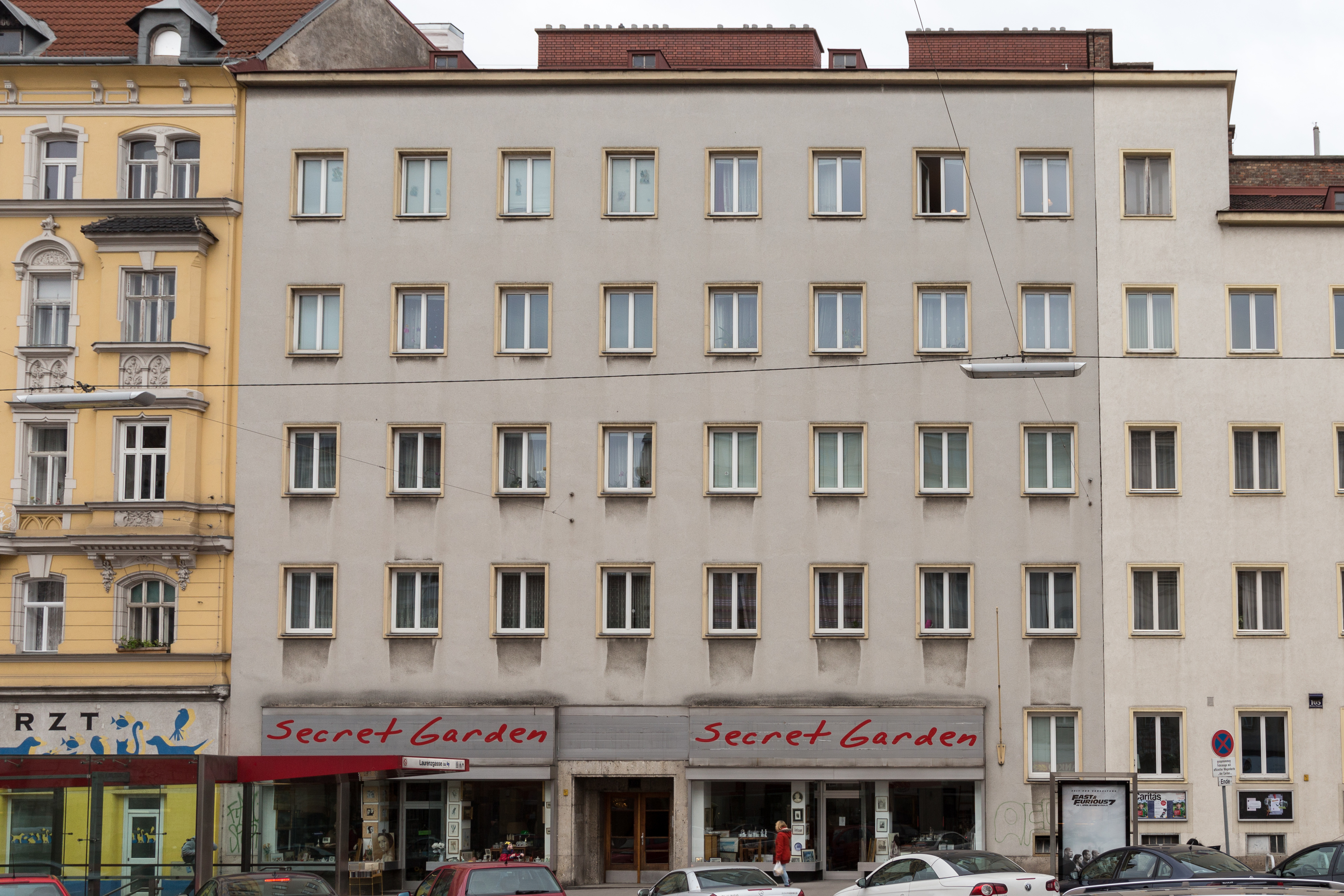
Imadec's neighborhood in 2018

As of 2018, Imadec is offering seminars in "advanced negotiations" and "C-suite management".

In its sales brochures, Imadec still describes itself as an "academic institution" and refers to its instructors as "university professors" in a way that suggests, although does not claim outright, that the title is due to their being employed by Imadec. Imadec's two current instructors are in fact teachers at legitimate universities; their classes at Imadec are side jobs. Imadec "diplomas", described as "internationally recognized" in Imadec brochures, can be obtained for EUR 12,800 plus ten to sixteen days' worth of attendance.

Now operating out of a mid-market office building in the working class district of Margareten, the company continues to refer to its owners as "President and Fellows" and to its staff as "faculty", and continues to emphasize extravagant academic vestments in its marking materials.

== Notable alumni ==
- Werner Amon
- Andreas Brandstetter
- Tillmann Fuchs
- Saif al-Islam Gaddafi
- Karl von Habsburg
- Princess Adelheid of Liechtenstein
- Gerald Mikscha
- Sylvia Papházy
- Karl-Heinz Strauss
- Ralph Vallon
- Theresia Zierler
