= Gaddafi International Foundation for Charity Associations =

Former international non-governmental organisation

Gaddafi International Charity and Development Foundation
- Abbreviation: GICDF
- Formation: 1998
- Dissolved: 2011
- Type: NGO
- Legal status: Foundation
- Purpose: Volunteering; Human Rights; Poverty
- Headquarters: Madinat Saleh Street, Tripoli, Libya
- Region served: Worldwide
- President: Saif al-Islam Gaddafi
- Main organ: Executive committee
- Website: http://gicdf.org/

The Gaddafi International Charity and Development Foundation (GICDF, Arabic: مؤسسة القذافي العالمية للجمعيات الخيرية والتنمية), known also as GIFCA, was an international non-governmental organisation (NGO) with headquarters formerly located in the Libyan capital Tripoli and offices in Chad, Germany, the Philippines and Sudan. GICDF was established in 1998 upon signature of its charter in Geneva, Switzerland. The president of the Foundation was Saif al-Islam Gaddafi, a son of the former Libyan leader Muammar Gaddafi.

== Subsidiaries ==
Elected by the Foundation's executive committee, the executive director was Yousef Swani who oversaw GICDF's seven subsidiaries, each of which had its own management. The subsidiary societies of GIFCA were:

- Human Rights Society;
- Libyan National Society for Drug Control;
- Society of Brothers in the South;
- De-mining Society;
- Society for the Underprivileged;
- 1973 Libyan Airline Victims Society.

== Objectives ==
GICDF's objectives were:

- to support the efforts of the associated societies and coordinate their activities;
- to support the principle of voluntary work for the welfare of society and safeguarding human rights;
- to support the establishment of new NGOs based on volunteering that will implement projects and activities to the benefit of society;
- to support vulnerable segments of society;
- to work with welfare organisations for the elimination of poverty;
- to create awareness of social and humanitarian work through public information activity at national and international level; and,
- to strengthen co-operation with international and regional organisations with similar objectives.

== Notable activities ==
The Gaddafi International Foundation intervened in various hostage situations involving Islamic militants and, most notably, the crisis of the HIV trial in Libya and the resulting European Union-Libyan rapprochement. In January 2004, GIFCA was instrumental in resolving the compensation issue in relation to the 1989 bombing of UTA Flight 772 when it concluded an agreement with the UTA relatives organisation "Les Familles du DC10 d'UTA" to pay $1 million to each of the 170 victims' families. Interviewed by French newspaper Le Figaro on 7 December 2007 GIFCA's president Saif al-Islam Gaddafi said that the Libyans convicted for the Pan Am Flight 103 and the UTA Flight 772 bombings "are innocent". When asked if Libya would therefore seek reimbursement of the compensation paid to the families of the victims ($2.33 billion in total), Gaddafi replied: "I don't know."

== Controversies ==
The Gaddafi International Foundation's donations to the London School of Economics have been a source of controversy. In February 2011, LSE students occupied their university in response to Muammar Gaddafi's alleged repressive measures taken against Libyan people. As a result of the LSE Gaddafi links's affair, LSE's director Sir Howard Davies resigned from the School on 3 March.
