= David Held =

British political scientist

- Born: 27 August 1951
- Died: 2 March 2019 (aged 67)

Academic background
- Education: MIT

Academic work
- Institutions: Open University; London School of Economics; University College, Durham University
- Main interests: Politics and International Relations

Notes
- Held was co-founder of the publishing company Polity Press

David Jonathan Andrew Held (27 August 1951 – 2 March 2019) was a British political scientist who specialised in political theory and international relations. He held a joint appointment as Professor of Politics and International Relations, and was Master of University College, at Durham University until his death. He was also a visiting Professor of Political Science at Libera Università Internazionale degli Studi Sociali Guido Carli. Previously he was the Graham Wallas chair of Political Science and the co-director of the Centre for the Study of Global Governance at the London School of Economics.

Together with Daniele Archibugi, Held had been prominent in the development of cosmopolitanism, and of cosmopolitan democracy in particular. He was an active scholar on issues of globalisation, global governance and was joint editor-in-chief of the academic journal Global Policy.

== Biography ==
David Held was born to industrialist Peter Held and Gisela (née Wolff) in Britain where he spent most of his childhood. He took his undergraduate degree from the University of Manchester; upon completing his doctoral studies at the Massachusetts Institute of Technology he conducted post-doctoral research at the University of Cambridge. He worked for the Open University (OU) between 1991 and 2000, as a professor of Politics and Sociology. Among other things, he contributed to teaching on democracy at the OU. He moved to a chair at the LSE in 2000. He held numerous visiting appointments in the United States, Australia, Canada, Spain and Italy, among other places.

Held co-founded Polity press in 1984, which has become a leading publisher in the social sciences and humanities across the world. He was also the general editor for Global Policy, an academic journal started in 2008 that focuses on bridging the gap between academics and practitioners on issues of global significance.

In January 2012, he succeeded Professor Maurice Tucker as Master of University College, Durham, alongside his chair in the School of Government and International Affairs at Durham University.

Held died in College on 2 March 2019 after suffering ill health. He is survived by his wife, Psychoanalyst and Filmmaker Francesca Joseph and their two children Jacob and Zachary Joseph Held. He is also survived by Rosa and Josh Held, the children from a previous marriage to the novelist Michelle Spring.

== Research ==
Since his first book was published in 1980 (Introduction to Critical Theory), David Held pursued a multilevel inquiry into the nature and changing form of national and international politics. This approach involved three kinds of work. First, it involved extensive empirical enquiry into the dynamic character, structural elements and governance failures of contemporary society. The empirical dimensions of his work included books such as Global Transformations (1999), Globalization/Anti-globalization (2007), Global Inequality (2007) and Gridlock: Why Global Cooperation is Failing When We Need it Most (2013). These books map the changing global context of politics, how the world has become increasingly interconnected, and how failures of leadership and negotiation at the global level are creating a breakdown of multilateralism and global governance.

Second, he was investigating the changing nature and form of the modern state and the locus of the political good. Held examined the question of whether the nation state alone, as typically assumed by political theory, can be the sole home of democracy, accountability and the rule of law. This entailed a critical evaluation of the concepts of democracy, sovereignty, governance and cosmopolitanism, among other concepts. Books that have explored these themes include: Democracy in the Global Order (1999), Models of Democracy (2006), Cosmopolitanism: ideals and realities (2010).

The third element of Held's work was to explore how and in what ways one can move beyond the crises and dilemmas of politics and governance in the contemporary world. Books such as Global Covenant (2004), Debating Globalization (2005) and a wide range of academic articles set out the contours of a multiactor, multilevel democratic politics framed by the fundamental principles of democracy, justice and sustainability.

Accordingly, Held's work explored, on the one hand, the shift in politics from nation states to what he called a world of 'overlapping communities of fate' (where the fortunes of countries are increasingly enmeshed) and, on the other hand, how democratic standards and cosmopolitan values can be entrenched in the global order. In pursuing this multilevel approach Held saw himself working within the classic tradition of political theory which has always been concerned with how to characterize the world in which we live, how to develop and reach normative goals such as liberty, democracy and social justice, and how to move from where we are to where we might like to be. Held's response to this challenge was to explore the way globalization has altered the landscape of politics, how cosmopolitanism provides ideals that enable one to rethink politics and the political good, and to pursue political stepping stones that could help embed this agenda. He offered a contribution to a pressing dialogue of our times: how to resolve collective action problems, nationally and globally, through institutions and governance arrangements that enhance democracy, social justice and the participation of all citizens in a democratic public life.

== Links to Libya ==
In March, 2011, Held's name came to be linked with the LSE–Gaddafi affair. Held was an advisor of Saif al-Islam Gaddafi, son of Libyan leader Muammar Gaddafi, who received his PhD from LSE in 2008.

== Selected ==
=== Books ===
- Held, David (1980). Introduction to critical theory: Horkheimer to Habermas. Berkeley: University of California Press. ISBN 0520041755.
- Held, David (1983). States and societies. New York: New York University Press. ISBN 9780814734223.
- Held, David (2006) [1987]. Models of democracy (3rd ed.). Stanford, California: Stanford University Press. ISBN 9780804754729.
- Held, David (1989). Political theory and the modern state: essays on state, power, and democracy. Stanford, California: Stanford University Press. ISBN 9780804717489.
- Held, David; Thompson, John B. (1989). Social theory of modern societies: Anthony Giddens and his critics. Cambridge, UK New York, New York: Cambridge University Press. ISBN 9780521278553.
- Held, David (1989). Introduction to critical theory: Horkheimer to Habermas. Berkeley: University of California Press. ISBN 9780745607696.
- Held, David; Hall, Stuart; McGrew, Anthony (1992). Modernity and its futures. Cambridge: Polity Press in association with the Open University. ISBN 9780745609669.
- Held, David (1993). Prospects for democracy : North, South, East, West. Cambridge, UK Malden, Massachusetts: Polity Press. ISBN 9780804721936.
- Held, David; Archibugi, Daniele (1995). Democracy and the global order: from the modern state to cosmopolitan governance. Stanford, California: Stanford University Press. ISBN 9780804726870.
- Held, David (1995). Cosmopolitanism: an agenda for a new world order. Cambridge, UK Malden, Massachusetts: Polity Press. ISBN 9780745613819.
- Held, David; Archibugi, Daniele; Koehler, Martin (1998). Re-imagining political community: studies in cosmopolitan democracy. Stanford, California: Stanford University Press. ISBN 9780804735353.
- Held, David; Goldblatt, David; McGrew, Anthony; Perraton, Jonathan (1999). Global transformations: politics, economics and culture. Stanford, California: Stanford University Press. ISBN 9780745614991.
- Held, David (2000). A globalizing world?: Culture, economics, politics. London New York: Routledge in association with the Open University. ISBN 9780415222945.
- Held, David; McGrew, Anthony (2007) [2002]. Globalization/anti-globalization: beyond the great divide (2nd ed.). Cambridge, UK Malden, Massachusetts: Polity Press. ISBN 9780745639116.
- Held, David; Koenig-Archibugi, Mathias (2003). Taming globalization: frontiers of governance. Cambridge, UK Malden, Massachusetts: Polity Press. ISBN 9780745630779.
- Held, David (2004). Global covenant: the Social Democratic alternative to the Washington consensus. Cambridge, UK Malden, Massachusetts: Polity Press. ISBN 9780745633527.
- Held, David; Koenig-Archibugi, Mathias (2005). Global governance and public accountability. Oxford, UK: Wiley-Blackwell. ISBN 9781405126786.
- Held, David; Kaya, Ayse (2006). Global inequality: patterns and explanations. Cambridge, UK Malden, Massachusetts: Polity Press. ISBN 9780745638867.
- Held, David; McGrew, Anthony (2007). Globalization theory: approaches and controversies. Cambridge, UK Malden, Massachusetts: Polity Press. ISBN 9780745632100.
- Held, David; Mepham, David (2007). Progressive foreign policy: new directions for the UK. Cambridge, UK Malden, Massachusetts: Polity Press. ISBN 9780745641140.
- Held, David; Moore, Henrietta L. (2008). Cultural politics in a global age: uncertainty, solidarity, and innovation. Oxford: One World Publications. ISBN 9781851685509.
- Held, David (2010). Cosmopolitanism: ideals and realities. Cambridge, UK Malden, Massachusetts: Polity Press. ISBN 9780745648354.
- Held, David; Coates-Ulrichsen, Kristian (2013). The end of the American Century: from 9/11 to the Arab Spring. Cambridge, UK Malden, Massachusetts: Polity Press. ISBN 9780745663722.
- Held, David; Roger, Charles; Nag, Eva-Maria (2013). Climate governance in the developing world. Cambridge, UK Malden, Massachusetts: Polity Press. ISBN 9780745662770.
- Held, David; Hale, Tom; Young, Kevin (2013). Gridlock: why global cooperation is failing when we need it most. Cambridge, UK Malden, Massachusetts: Polity Press. ISBN 9780745662398.
- David Held, Charles Roger (eds.). 2013. Global Governance at Risk. Wiley. ISBN 9780745665245
- Held, David; Koenig-Archibugi, Mathias (2014). Global policy: power, governance and accountability. Cambridge, UK Malden, Massachusetts: Polity Press.
- David Held, Pietro Maffettone (Eds.). 2016. Global Political Theory. Wiley. ISBN 9780745685175
- Thomas Hale, David Held. 2017. Beyond Gridlock. Wiley. ISBN 9781509515714

=== Chapters in books ===
- Held, David (2005), "Principles of the cosmopolitan order", in Brighouse, Harry; Brock, Gillian (eds.), The political philosophy of cosmopolitanism, Cambridge New York: Cambridge University Press, pp. 10–27, ISBN 978-0-52184-660-8.

=== Journal articles ===
- Archibugi, Daniele; Held, David (Winter 2011). "Cosmopolitan Democracy: Paths and Agents". Ethics & International Affairs. 25 (4): 433–461. doi.org/10.1017/S0892679411000360.
- Held, David; Fane-Hervey, Angus (November 2009). "Democracy, climate change and global governance". Policy Network. Archived from the original (paper) on 5 September 2017. Pdf.
- Held, David; Koenig-Archibugi, Mathias (Spring 2004). "Introduction". Government and Opposition. 39 (2): 125–131. doi:10.1111/j.1477-7053.2004.00117.x. S2CID 232180413.
- Held, David (Spring 2004). "Democratic accountability and political effectiveness from a cosmopolitan perspective". Government and Opposition. 39 (2): 364–391. doi:10.1111/j.1477-7053.2004.00127.x. S2CID 144477961.

Academic offices
Preceded by Eva Schumacher-Reid	Master of University College, Durham; 2012–2019	Succeeded by Richard Lawrie
