= Judith Rees =

British academic, educator

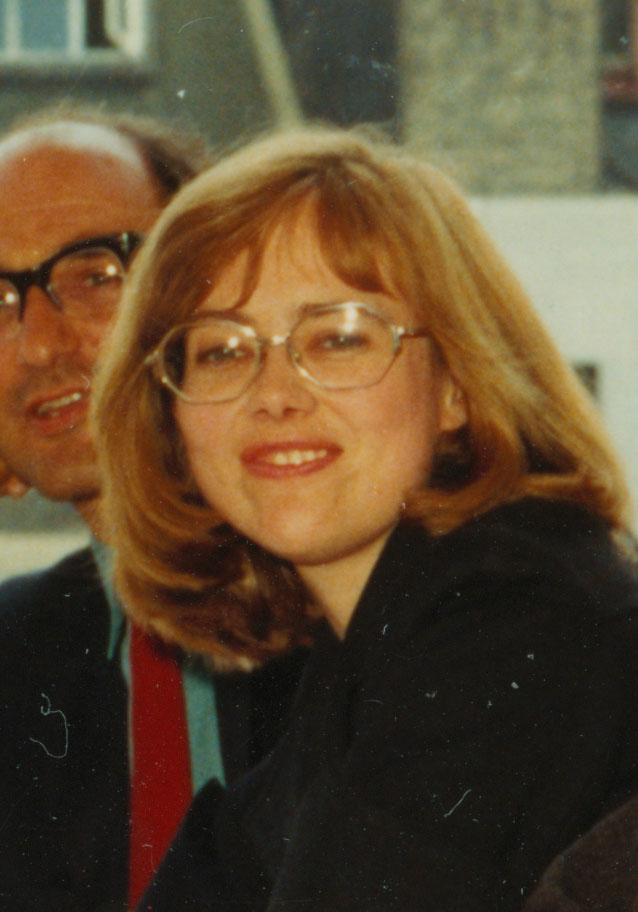
- Born: 26 August 1944 (age 82); Nottingham
- Spouse: David Jones

Dame Judith Anne Rees (born 26 August 1944) is a British geographer who was interim director of London School of Economics and Political Science (LSE) from May 2011 until September 2012. Professor Rees also acts as director for its Centre for Climate Change Economics and Policy (hosted jointly with the University of Leeds) and is vice-chair of the Grantham Research Institute on Climate Change and the Environment.

== Education ==
Rees was born in Nottingham, where she attended Bilborough Grammar School. She then went on to study economics at the London School of Economics, graduating in 1965. She completed her MPhil and PhD also at the University of London.

== Career ==
Rees joined LSE in 1969 as a lecturer in geography. Her main research interests include climate change and the governance of environmental resources and risk. In the early 1990s she was the dean of Geography and pro-vice chancellor at the University of Hull. She then became head of Geography and deputy director of LSE until 2004. From May 2011 until September 2012, Rees was the acting director of the London School of Economics. She was the President of the Royal Geographical Society from 2012 to 2015, the first woman to take on this role in the society's history and working with Dr Rita Gardner as Director.

Rees is also chair of the LSE's Grantham Institute on Climate Change, a board member of the UN Secretary General's advisory board on Water and Sanitation and the International Scientific Advisory Council (ISAC), a director of the Centre for Climate Change Economics and Policy, and a member of the Dutch national research programmes on Climate changes Spatial Planning (CcSP) and "Knowledge for Climate" (KfC). Formerly, she acted as an adviser to the World Bank on water privatisation.

=== Awards ===
Rees was appointed Commander of the Order of the British Empire (CBE) in 2006 and Dame Commander of the Order of the British Empire (DBE) in the 2013 Birthday Honours for services to higher education.

== Personal life ==
She was married to David Jones, professor emeritus at LSE.

Educational offices
Preceded by Howard Davies	Director of the London School of Economics; 2011 – 2012	Succeeded by Craig Calhoun
Non-profit organization positions
Preceded by Michael Palin	President of the Royal Geographical Society; 2012 – 2015	Succeeded by Nicholas Crane
