= Saif al-Islam Gaddafi =

Libyan political figure (1972–2026)

- سيف الإسلام القذافي
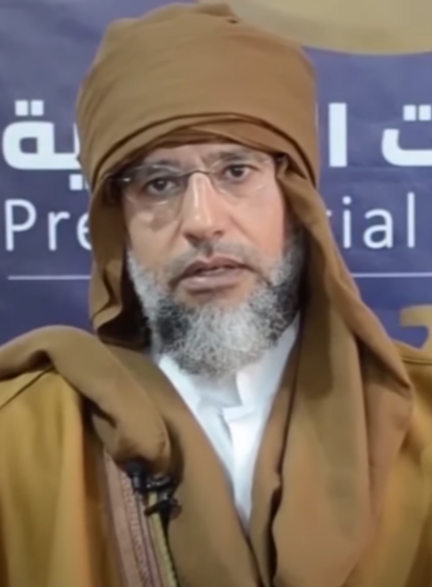
- Saif al-Islam in 2021

Leader of the Popular Front for the Liberation of Libya
- In office 26 December 2016 – 3 February 2026
- Preceded by: Office established

Personal details
- Born: Saif al-Islam Muammar Gaddafi (Note: Arabic: سيف الإسلام معمر القذافي, romanized: Saif al-Islām Muʿammar al-Qaḏḏāfī); 25 June 1972 Tripoli, Libya
- Died: 3 February 2026 (aged 53) Zintan, Libya
- Cause of death: Assassination by gunshot
- Resting place: Old Manasla Cemetery, Bani Walid, Libya
- Party: PFLL
- Domestic partner: None Confirmed
- Parents: Muammar Gaddafi (father); Safia Farkash (mother)
- Education: Al Fateh University; Imadec Executive Education; London School of Economics
- Occupation: Engineer; diplomat; painter; philanthropist; soldier
- Website: GICDF (defunct)

Military service
- Allegiance: Libyan Arab Jamahiriya
- Branch: Libyan Army
- Conflict: First Libyan Civil War

Saif al-Islam Muammar al-Gaddafi (25 June 1972 – 3 February 2026) was a Libyan political figure. He was the second son of the late Libyan leader Muammar Gaddafi and his second wife Safia Farkash. He was a part of his father's inner circle, performing public relations and diplomatic roles on his behalf.

He publicly turned down his father's offer of the country's second-highest post and held no official government position. According to United States Department of State officials in Tripoli, during his father's reign, he was the second most widely recognized person in Libya, being at times the de facto prime minister, and was mentioned as a possible successor, though he rejected this. However, in spite of his earlier claim of not wanting to be a successor, Gaddafi was acknowledged by 2015 to have been his father's heir apparent, with anybody wanting to do business in Libya having to go through him first. An arrest warrant was issued for him on 27 June 2011 by the International Criminal Court (ICC) for charges of crimes against humanity against the Libyan people, for killing and persecuting civilians, under Articles 7(1)(a) and 7(1)(h) of the Rome Statute. He denied the charges.

Gaddafi was captured in southern Libya by the Zintan militia on 19 November 2011, after the end of the Libyan Civil War, and flown by plane to Zintan. He was sentenced to death on 28 July 2015 by a court in Tripoli for crimes during the civil war, in a widely criticized trial conducted in absentia. He remained in the custody of the de facto independent authorities of Zintan. On 10 June 2017, he was released from prison in Zintan, according to a statement from the Abu Bakr al-Siddiq Battalion. Later the same month, his full amnesty was declared by the Tobruk-based government led by Khalifa Haftar. As of December 2019, Gaddafi remained wanted under his ICC arrest warrant for crimes against humanity. On 14 November, he attempted to register as a candidate in the presidential election originally scheduled to take place in December 2021, but was rejected. This decision was overturned less than a month later, which reinstated his candidacy, although the election was indefinitely postponed several weeks later.

On 3 February 2026, Gaddafi was assassinated at his home by four unknown gunmen who fled the scene.

== Early life and career ==
Gaddafi was born in Tripoli on 25 June 1972. He graduated with a Bachelor of Science degree in engineering science from Al Fateh University in Tripoli in 1994. However, another report states that he was an architect. After several countries, including France and Canada, refused to grant him a student visa, Gaddafi earned an MBA from the Imadec business school in Vienna, where he became friends with OPEC official Shukri Ghanem and Austrian far-right politician Jörg Haider. Upon his arrival in Vienna, Gaddafi was granted permission by the Mayor of Vienna and the head of Schönbrunn Zoo to keep his pet tigers at the zoo. According to Simon McDonald, Gaddafi still had a white tiger at his farm near Tripoli in the late 2000s, but the white tiger was later turned into a rug in Gaddafi's majlis.

Gaddafi's paintings made up the bulk of the international Libyan art exhibit, "The Desert is Not Silent" (2002–2005), a show which was supported by a host of international corporations with direct ties to his father's government, among them the ABB Group, Siemens, Petro-Canada, Bombardier, and SNC-Lavalin.

In 2002, Gaddafi sued The Sunday Telegraph for libel over a 1995 article that alleged he had masterminded an international money-laundering conspiracy. The lawsuit was settled after the intervention of Bandar bin Sultan Al Saud with The Sunday Telegraph agreeing to publish an apology and pay a portion of Gaddafi's legal costs.

In 2005, Gaddafi was awarded a "Young Global Leader" title by the World Economic Forum. In January 2011, WEF founder Klaus Schwab personally invited Gaddafi to attend the annual WEF Forum in Davos.

Gaddafi was awarded a PhD degree in 2008 from the London School of Economics, where he attended amid a series of contacts between the school and the Libyan political establishment. He presented a thesis on: "The role of civil society in the democratisation of global governance institutions: from 'soft power' to collective decision-making?" Examined by Meghnad Desai (London School of Economics) and Anthony McGrew (University of Southampton), among the LSE academics acknowledged in the thesis as directly assisting with it were Nancy Cartwright, David Held and Alex Voorhoeve (the son of former Dutch minister Joris Voorhoeve). Professor Joseph Nye of Harvard University was also thanked for having read portions of the manuscript and providing advice and direction. Alongside accusations of plagiarism, allegations abound that Gaddafi's thesis was in many parts ghost-written by consultants from Monitor Group, which earned $3 million per year in fees from Muammar Gaddafi.

Speaking in Sabha on 20 August 2008, Gaddafi said that he would no longer involve himself in state affairs. He noted that he had previously "intervene[d] due to the absence of institutions", but said that he would no longer do so. He dismissed any potential suggestion that this decision was due to disagreement with his father, saying that they were on good terms. He also called for political reforms within the context of the Jamahiriya system and rejected the notion that he could succeed his father, saying that "this is not a farm to inherit".

Gaddafi, who was considered a reformist, had a longstanding rivalry with his hardline brother Mutassim and his influence began to wane after the lifting of international sanctions. In November 2010, Gaddafi's independent newspaper was suspended after it published an article calling for a "final assault" on his father's government. His newspaper also defended his father's former chief of protocol Nuri Mesmari, who had defected to France earlier that month. Some of his allies, including 20 reporters, were arrested.

=== Charity and social affairs ===
Gaddafi was the president of the Libyan National Association for Drugs and Narcotics Control (DNAG). In 1998, he founded the official charity, the Gaddafi International Foundation for Charity Associations, which intervened in various hostage situations involving Islamic militants and the crisis of the HIV trial in Libya and the resulting European Union-Libyan rapprochement.

In 2009, both Amnesty International and Human Rights Watch were allowed entry to Libya, via Gaddafi's non-profit organization in order to gather facts about the human rights situation in Libya. While AI and HRW reported that there were concerns about the "repressive atmosphere," both felt there were signs of "improvement" and HRW said that one should not "underestimate the importance of the efforts made so far" by Gaddafi in the realm of human rights in Libya.

In December 2010, Gaddafi announced that his charity foundation "will no longer be involved in promoting human rights and political change in the North African country," and that instead, it "will focus on its 'core charitable mission' of delivering aid and relief to sub-Saharan Africa."

The board meeting of the foundation was moved from Tripoli to London due to hostilities from hardliners of his father's regime.

== International diplomacy ==
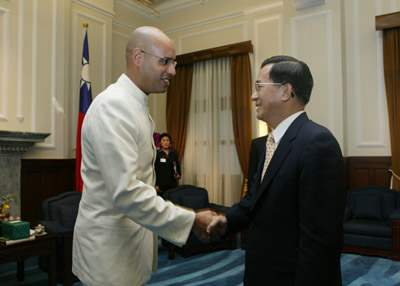
Gaddafi meeting with President of Taiwan Chen Shui-bian during his visit to Taiwan (2006)

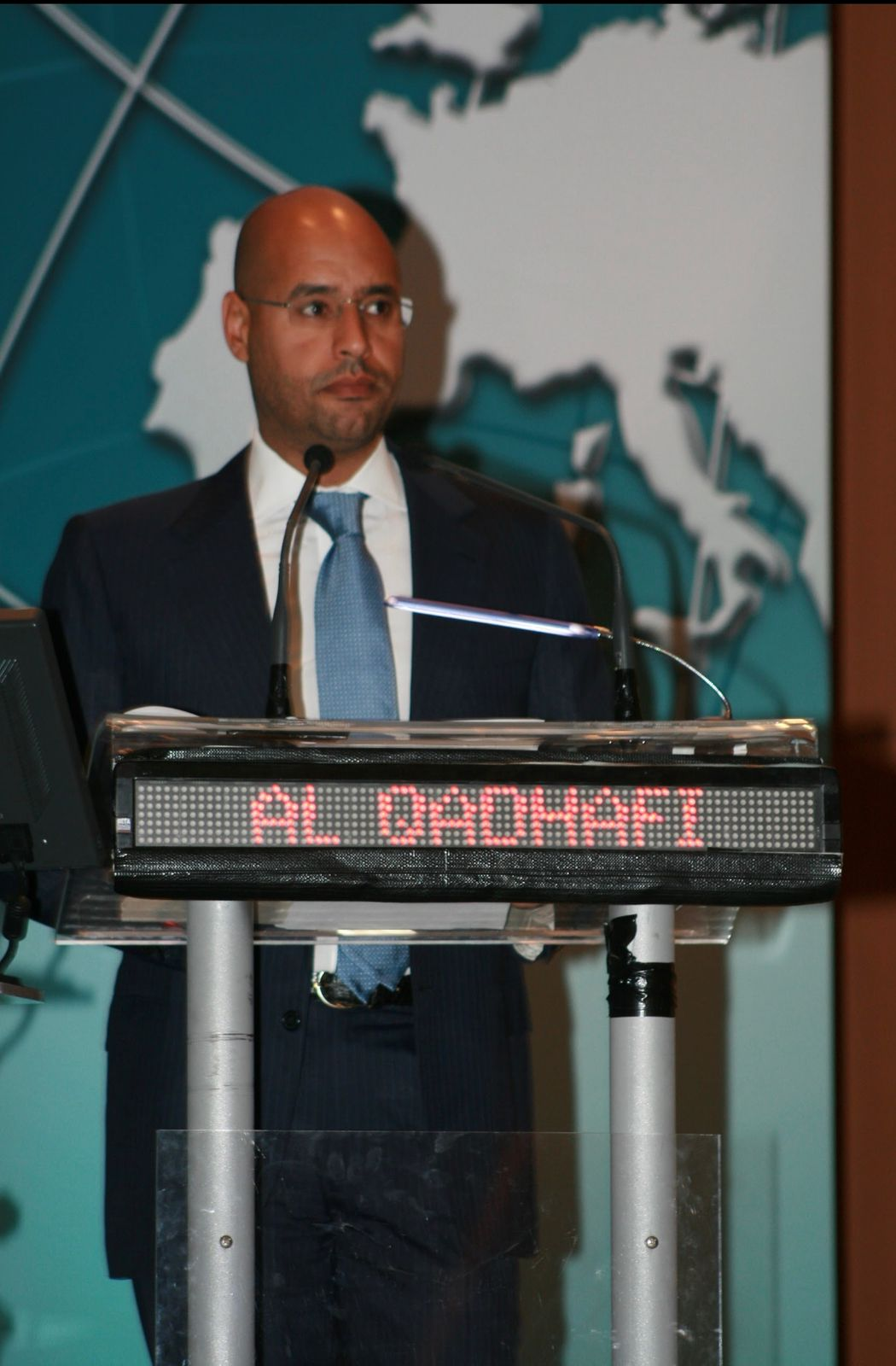
Gaddafi in 2007

Gaddafi was instrumental in negotiations that led to Libya's abandoning a weapons of mass destruction programme in 2002–2003. He arranged several important business deals on behalf of the Libyan regime in the period of rapprochement that followed. He was viewed as a reformer, and openly criticized the regime:

[a] congressional aide asked him what Libya needed most. His one-word answer: democracy.

"You mean Libya needs more democracy?" the aide asked.

"No. 'More democracy' would imply that we had some," Gaddafi said.

=== HIV trial ===
Gaddafi played an important role in the HIV trial in Libya. At first, he rejected information that the medics were tortured. "During this time we saw Gaddafi's son on a television broadcast categorically denying that Libya still tortured suspected criminals", claimed Valya Chervianashka, one of the accused nurses in her autobiography. Later he admitted in interviews that the Bulgarian nurses, charged with conspiring to deliberately infect over 400 children with HIV in 1998, had been tortured and that the government had denied them a fair trial. His admissions were said to have badly damaged his reputation in Libya.

The torture process is confirmed and described in details in the book Notes from Hell, co-written by one of the nurses, Valya Chervianashka. Saif al-Islam Gaddafi was mentioned several times in the book. According to her:

One day, the executive director of Muammar al-Gaddafi's son's foundation, the Gaddafi International Foundation for Charity Associations (GICDF), arrived at the prison, inviting us to the director's office of the women's wing for a meeting. We were in our pyjamas, dishevelled and unprepared. We hastily put on some clothes and hurried to meet the director. A Libyan man along with Ambassador Lyudmil Spassov and Roumen Petrov waited for us outside the office. The Ambassador told us, "This is a very important person. He will help you; he is on your side." Saleh Abdel Salam, executive director of GICDF, was intimidating. We didn't realise it then, but this Libyan man would indeed help us in the future.

=== Isratine proposal ===
Gaddafi introduced the Isratin proposal to permanently resolve the Israeli–Palestinian conflict through a secular, federalist, republican, binational one-state solution.

=== Philippine peace process ===
Gaddafi served as Chairman of the Gaddafi International Foundation for Charitable Associations. In this role, he was involved in a number of humanitarian initiatives. Gaddafi's first foray into international diplomacy was serving as an intermediary between the Abu Sayyaf terrorist group and the Government of the Philippines in August 2000. Notably, he hosted peace talks between the Government of the Philippines and the Moro Islamic Liberation Front in Tripoli. In the resulting peace agreement concluded on 22 June 2001, Gaddafi was expressly thanked for his involvement. He was also the witness to the signing of the peace agreement. The peace agreement forms a part of the Comprehensive Agreement on the Bangsamoro concluded in 2014.

=== 2008 agreement with Italy ===
Gaddafi was involved in negotiating compensation from Libya's former colonial power, Italy, and on 30 August 2008 a Friendship, Partnership and Cooperation Agreement was signed in Benghazi by his father and Italy's Prime minister Silvio Berlusconi. However, the treaty was unilaterally suspended by Italy at the beginning of 2011, after Italy refused to consider Gaddafi government as their interlocutor.

=== Compensation for American terror victims ===
He was also negotiating with the United States in order to conclude a comprehensive agreement making any further payments for American victims of terror attacks that have been blamed on Libya – such as the 1986 Berlin discotheque bombing, the 1988 Lockerbie bombing and the 1989 UTA Flight 772 bombing – conditional upon U.S. payment of compensation for the 40 Libyans killed and 220 injured in the 1986 United States bombing of Tripoli and Benghazi. On 14 August 2008, the U.S.-Libya Comprehensive Claims Settlement Agreement was signed in Tripoli. Former British Ambassador to Libya Oliver Miles described the agreement as "a bold step, with political cost for both parties" and wrote an article in the online edition of The Guardian querying whether the agreement is likely to work.

In an August 2008 BBC TV interview, Gaddafi said that Libya had admitted responsibility (but not "guilt") for the Lockerbie bombing simply to get trade sanctions removed. He further admitted that Libya was being "hypocritical" and was "playing on words", but said Libya had no other choice on the matter. According to Gaddafi, a letter admitting "responsibility" was the only way to end the economic sanctions imposed on Libya. When asked about the $10m (£5.3m) compensation that Libya was paying to each victims' family, he again repeated that Libya was doing so because it had no other choice. He went on to describe the families of the Lockerbie victims as "trading with the blood of their sons and daughters" and being very "greedy", saying, "They were asking for more money and more money and more money".

=== Diplomacy for extraditing Libyans ===
Interviewed by French newspaper Le Figaro on 7 December 2007, Gaddafi said that the seven Libyans convicted for the Pan Am Flight 103 and the UTA Flight 772 bombings "are innocent". When asked if Libya would therefore seek reimbursement of the compensation paid to the families of the victims (US$2.33 billion), Gaddafi replied: "I don't know." Gaddafi led negotiations with Britain for the release of Abdelbaset al-Megrahi, the convicted Pan Am 103 conspirator. In August 2009, after Scotland's Cabinet Secretary of Justice Kenny MacAskill ordered Megharahi's release, Gaddafi drafted letters to Alex Salmond, the First Minister of Scotland, and Simon McDonald, foreign policy adviser of British Prime Minister Gordon Brown, thanking them for their support, which led to accusation of undue political influence in the Megharahi case.

In 2007, Gaddafi met with French President Nicolas Sarkozy in Tripoli, with whom it is alleged he helped broker an arms deal, including missiles.

In November 2008, Gaddafi made a high-profile visit to the United States where he met with US Secretary of State, Condoleezza Rice. During the meeting, Rice raised the case of Libya's jailed political dissident and democracy activist, Fathi El-Jahmi. In a Forbes article in 2009, Fathi's brother wrote that "for nearly a year, both Amnesty International and Human Rights Watch hesitated to advocate publicly for Fathi's case, because they feared their case workers might lose access to Libyan visas."

In 2009, Gaddafi welcomed Sarah Leah Whitson, director of Human Rights Watch's Middle East division, into Libya, accompanying her in meeting with many government officials and others during her visit. She wrote of her official visit that "the real impetus for the transformation rests squarely with a quasi-governmental organization, the Qaddafi Foundation for International Charities and Development" chaired by Gaddafi. She praised Gaddafi for establishing the country's two semi-private newspapers, and said "it is impossible to underestimate the importance of the efforts made so far. Let's hope this spring will last."

=== Stand-off with US officials ===
In 2009, Gaddafi claimed that Libya's opinion of him was shaped largely by his role in Libya's engagement with the West, saying "If something goes wrong, people will blame me, whether I am in a certain official position or not." He expressed frustration with the US, saying Libya's decision to give up its weapons of mass destruction program was contingent upon "compensation" from the US, including the signing of the Trade and Investment Framework Agreement, economic cooperation, and cooperation in purchasing conventional weapons and military equipment. He stated, "We share rich natural resources – oil and gas – along the borders, yet we have no capacity to defend that wealth." Because of a US legal embargo, Libya cannot purchase weapons from the United States, Sweden, or Germany, and has been disallowed from buying "Tiger" vehicles with American-manufactured engines from Jordan. He asked for greater military assistance, as Libya had committed itself to destroying chemical stockpiles, but would require at least $25 million to do so. Gaddafi said the United States had "humiliated" his father during his visit to New York City in 2009, and said that his father's tent and residence issues were disappointing and his UN speech had been misinterpreted. Gaddafi said that his father was barred from visiting Ground Zero, which also frustrated him. Gaddafi held a standoff with US officials in November 2009, refusing to send a shipment of Highly Enriched Uranium back to Russia unless the United States renewed its commitment to cooperation with Libya.

== Libyan civil war ==
=== Early phase and ceasefire efforts ===
Gaddafi was allegedly supportive of the Tunisian Revolution and cautiously optimistic of the 2011 Egyptian revolution in the early phase of the Arab Spring. On 19 February, several days after the Arab Spring came to Libya, Gaddafi announced the creation of a commission of inquiry into the violence, chaired by a Libyan judge, as reported on state television. He stated that the commission was intended to be "for members of Libyan and foreign organizations of human rights" and that it would "investigate the circumstances and events that have caused many victims." He also circulated an op-ed to several American newspapers calling for reform and a new constitution, but every newspaper rejected it. Later in the month, he went on state television to deny allegations that the government had launched airstrikes against Libyan cities and stated that the number of protesters killed had been exaggerated.

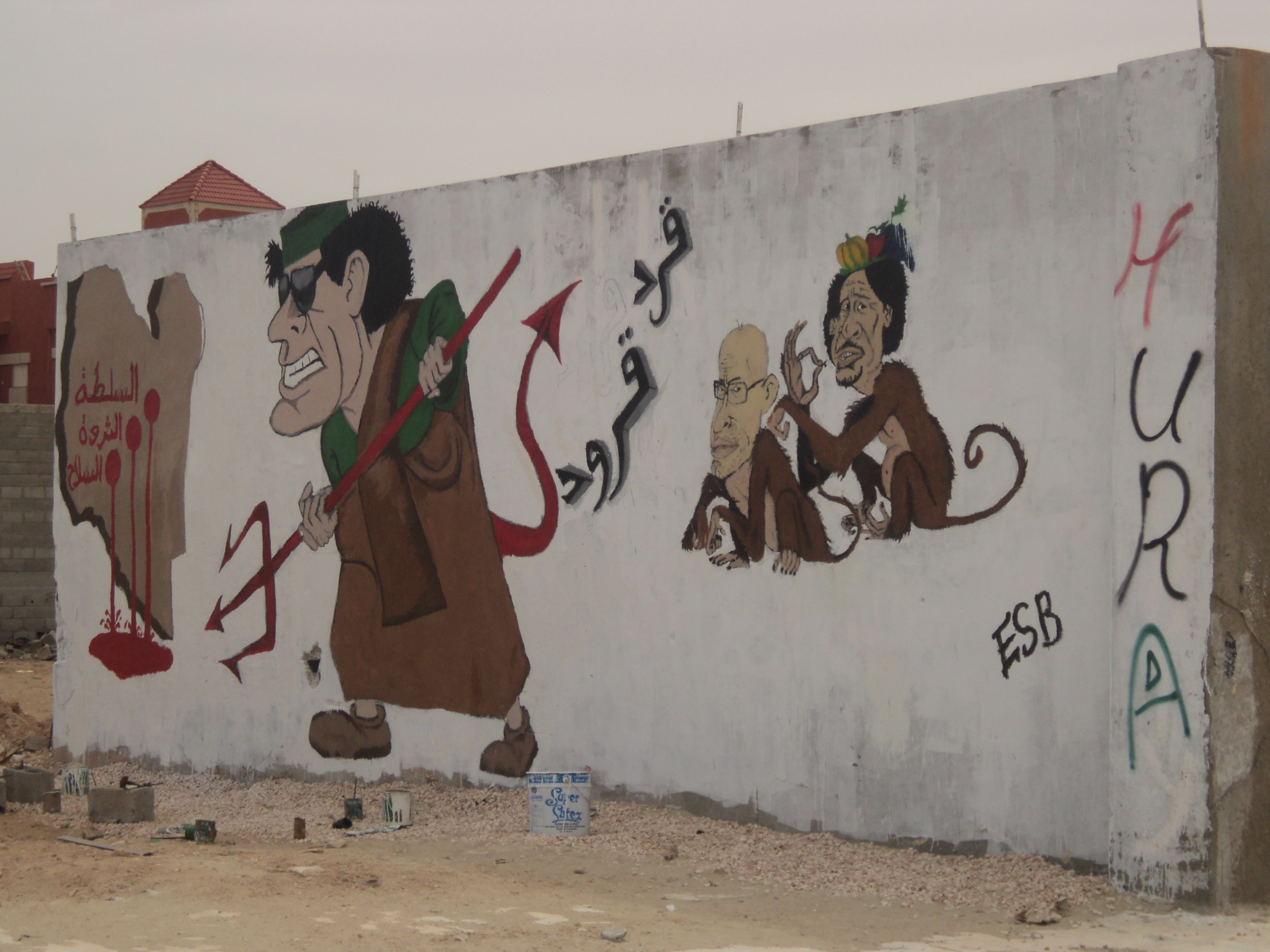
Satirical portraits of Muammar Gaddafi (left and right figures) and Saif al-Islam Gaddafi (centre) in Benghazi, 2011.

On 20 February 2011, Gaddafi delivered an address to the nation on Libyan state television stating that if no agreement could be found between protesters and the government "thousands of deaths, and rivers of blood will run through Libya". He also insisted that his father remained in charge with the army's backing and would "fight until the last man, the last woman, the last bullet." Speaking on Libyan state TV, Gaddafi blamed the civil war on tribal factions and Islamists acting on their own agendas, drunken and drugged. He promised reforms, and said the alternative would be civil war blocking trade and oil money and leading to the country being taken over by foreigners. He closed by saying, "We will not let Al Jazeera, Al Arabiya and BBC trick us." Oliver Miles, a former British Ambassador to Libya, disagreed with his assessment while public intellectual Benjamin Barber, a board member of the Gaddafi International Foundation for Charity Associations, defended Gaddafi as a reformer and called for Western engagement with Gaddafi as the best way to end the bloodshed. In an interview with ABC News reporter Christiane Amanpour, Gaddafi denied that his father's regime was killing civilians. On 21 February 2011, the World Economic Forum cut off contacts with Gaddafi and suspended him from the Forum of Young Global Leaders. On 19 March 2011, Gaddafi cut off contact with Western journalists due to NATO's military intervention in Libya.

On 27 April 2011, Gaddafi came to an agreement with Norwegian Foreign Minister Jonas Gahr Støre and senior NTC figure Ali Zeidan to end the war, but the deal was vetoed by Britain and France.

=== Death of Saif al-Arab and ICC arrest warrant ===
On 2 May 2011, Gaddafi and his older half-brother Muhammad were among the 2,000 mourners who attended his younger brother Saif al-Arab's funeral. He was seen touching his younger brother's chest while fighting back tears before leaving the graveside while pumping his fist to the crowd. Saif al-Arab and three of Muammar Gaddafi's grandchildren had been killed by a NATO airstrike on 30 April 2011.

In June 2011, Gaddafi and his father, Muammar Gaddafi, announced that they were willing to hold elections, and that Muammar Gaddafi would step aside if he lost. The younger Gaddafi stated that the elections could be held within three months and transparency would be guaranteed through international observers. NATO and the rebels rejected the offer, and NATO soon resumed their bombardment of Tripoli.

On 27 June 2011, an arrest warrant was issued by the ICC. On 1 July, Gaddafi had an interview with Russia Today, where he denied the ICC's allegations that he, or his father, ordered the killing of civilian protesters. He pointed out that he was not a member of the government or the military, and therefore had no authority to give such orders. According to Gaddafi, he made recorded calls to General Abdul Fatah Younis, who later defected to the rebel forces, requesting him not to use force against protesters, to which Younis responded that the protestors were attacking a military site, where surprised guards fired in self-defence. Younis was later assassinated by his fellow rebels on 28 July, allegedly for secret communication with Gaddafi.

Gaddafi condemned NATO for bombing Libyan civilians, including his family members and their children, under the false pretence that their homes were military bases. He stated that NATO offered to drop the ICC charges against him and his father if they accept a secret deal, an offer they rejected. He thus criticised the ICC as "a fake court" controlled by NATO member states.

On 3 August 2011, Gaddafi gave an interview to the New York Times stating that Libya was becoming more closely aligned to Islamists and would likely resemble Iran or Saudi Arabia. Gaddafi said that his father was working closely with Islamists within the rebellion to splinter the resistance.

=== Fall of Tripoli and escape to Bani Walid ===
On 21 August 2011, the National Transitional Council claimed that Gaddafi had been arrested by the National Liberation Army, pursuant to an arrest warrant issued by the International Criminal Court. However, on the early morning of 23 August, Gaddafi was sighted by Western journalists apparently moving around under his own free will outside the Rixos Hotel. He was later interviewed by Matthew Chance of CNN, where he claimed his father was also still in Tripoli and report of his arrest was a "trick" by rebels.

After the fall of Tripoli, Gaddafi called into Arrai TV and claimed that he was still in a suburb of Tripoli on 31 August. He later went to Bani Walid, but reportedly left on 3 September after attending the funeral of his brother Khamis. On 5 September, another brother, Saadi, said in an interview with CNN that an "aggressive" speech by Gaddafi had led to the breakdown of the negotiations between NTC forces and Gaddafi loyalists in Bani Walid. Shortly after Saadi fled to Niger on 11 September, another brother, Mutassim, was said to have crossed paths with Gaddafi for the last time. Their last encounter was acrimonious as Mutassim allegedly blamed Gaddafi's yesteryear reforms for causing their family's downfall. On 20 September, Arrai TV broadcast footage of Gaddafi rallying his father's supporters, promising them weapons, and appealing to them to retake Tripoli. Contrary to previous reports, Gaddafi apparently stayed in Bani Walid until the town was captured by NTC forces in early October.

=== Capture ===
On 17 October 2011, after leaving Bani Walid, Gaddafi's convoy was hit by a NATO air attack at Wadi Zamzam where he lost 26 of his supporters and 9 military vehicles. His right hand was wounded and according to his own explanation it happened during the NATO air strike. According to the Libyan Al Mashhad Al Leebi program, the fingers of his right hand were cut off.

With the death of his father Muammar and his brother Mutassim in Sirte on 20 October 2011, Gaddafi was the only member of the Gaddafi family left in Libya. He appeared on Syrian pro-Gaddafi television on 22 October claiming "I am in Libya, I am alive and free and willing to fight to the end and take revenge", but his whereabouts were unknown and subject to many rumors. On 24 October 2011, a National Transitional Council source claimed that Gaddafi had been given a forged passport near Murzuk and was in the Ghat area near the border of Niger and Algeria. The same source claimed that Abdullah Senussi was helping Gaddafi plot his escape.

An international team of lawyers representing the interests of Gaddafi wrote to US leaders demanding that he be protected from assassination and holding the United States and NATO responsible for the Libyan leader's "brutal assassination" and repeated attacks on Libya's civilian population.

On 19 November 2011, as Gaddafi was trying to flee from Libya, he and four aides were captured, and detained about 50 kilometres (31 mi) west of the town of Ubari near Sabha in southern Libya, 640 kilometres (400 mi) from Tripoli. Sources say that it was the betrayal by a Libyan nomad, Yussef Saleh al-Hotmani, that finally led to his capture. Yussef Saleh al-Hotmani told the interviewers that he was hired to guide a man to Niger and that he was offered €1 million for the job. Being offered such a huge sum of money, he suspected foul play as Gaddafi's agent did not tell him whom he was going to guide. He contacted the rebel fighters and told them where a two vehicle convoy would pass through southern Libya on the night of 18 November and this allowed the rebel fighters to ambush the convoy. Gaddafi was taken to Zintan by plane and, pending trial, he was kept in detention by the Zintan-militia that captured him.

A differing account was provided by Ejmi al-Atiri of the Zintan Brigades. According to al-Atiri, Gaddafi never offered them money in exchange for his release, but instead asked to be shot in the head. In addition to three severed fingers, Gaddafi also had wounds in his abdomen and his flanks and it was arranged that he be operated on in Zintan. He was operated on by Andrei Murakhovsky, a Ukrainian doctor working in Zintan, who disputed the rumor that Gaddafi's fingers had been cut off and claimed that his injuries were consistent with "some kind of explosion." Dr. Murakhovsky claimed that his fingers were gangrenous and thus needed to be amputated to prevent osteomyolitis. The operation took four hours, and he needed daily medical monitoring for two months. Al-Atiri stated that Gaddafi insisted he never paid foreign mercenaries to fight for his father and had no choice but to support his father due to traditional family loyalty. Atiri's account was corroborated by Gaddafi's former aide Youssef Sawani, who had defected to the rebels and stated that Gaddafi was not able to betray his family.

In a video filmed on the day of his capture, Gaddafi was seen warning his captors about the danger posed by Islamists, namely Abdelhakim Belhaj and Ali al-Sallabi.

== Criminal charges and trials ==
Based on his outstanding warrant the International Criminal Court (ICC) asked the new government about Gaddafi's detention. The new government was unable or unwilling to comply with the ICC's information requests regarding Gaddafi. New deadlines for information requests from the ICC were also missed. A brief filed by the Office of Public Counsel for the Defence on behalf of Gaddafi claimed that "there is no basis for asserting that the ICC should defer the case to Libya". The brief requested the court to order Libya to immediately implement Gaddafi's rights, and report Libya to the Security Council if it does not.

In June 2012, Australia lawyer Melinda Taylor and three other members from an ICC delegation were arrested by the Zintan Brigades while visiting Gaddafi and accused of passing coded messages to Gaddafi. They were freed a month later in a deal brokered by ICC President Sang-Hyun Song. In August 2012, the Libyan government announced that Gaddafi would stand trial in the western Libyan town of Zintan, in September 2012. However, the trial was subsequently delayed; Gaddafi appeared in court on 17 January 2013. However, trial was again delayed, and it wasn't until April 2014 that Gaddafi appeared in court in Tripoli, via video link for security reasons.

Libya appealed his extradition to the Hague Court (ICC), but the court affirmed the indictments. The court held that the Libyan government failed to show that Gaddafi faced the same charges in Libya as he did in the ICC.

On 28 July 2015, Gaddafi was sentenced to death in absentia for war crimes by the Tripoli-based "self-declared government". However, the Zintan authorities had consistently refused to either hand him over to the Tripoli authorities or to implement their sentence. The trial and the sentence have been criticised by the United Nations Human Rights Office (OHCHR) and by Human Rights Watch.

In July 2016, one of his lawyers, Karim Khan, claimed that his client had been freed on 12 April of that year and transferred to a secret location after the government quashed his sentence, and that he would petition the ICC to drop all charges against him. His release was corroborated by Ejmi al-Atiri, but a Zintan military source denied that he had been released.

In November 2016, the Middle East Eye reported that while Gaddafi was still officially a prisoner, he was free to travel around Zintan and frequently communicated through the Viber smartphone app.

In May 2017, Gaddafi allegedly survived an assassination attempt in Zintan by local militias.

== Release and return to politics ==
=== Speculations on whereabouts and political future ===
On 10 June 2017, Gaddafi was released from prison in Zintan, according to a statement from Abu Bakr al-Siddiq Battalion. The militia chose not to transfer him to the custody of the International Criminal Court, saying "We are not concerned with the international tribunal as the ICC did not ask us to hand him over". The UN-backed Libyan government based in Tripoli condemned his release while an ICC prosecutor was still trying to verify the release, and called on Libya and other states to arrest and surrender him, stating "Libya is obliged to immediately arrest and surrender Mr Gaddafi [...] regardless of any purported amnesty law." Gaddafi's lawyer, Karim Khan, could neither confirm nor deny Gaddafi's freedom, but claimed that he was in regular contact with Gaddafi and had previously visited him in the autumn of 2016.

On 22 June 2017, rumors circulated among Gaddafi loyalists that Gaddafi would make a TV appearance on Qadr Night, but Gaddafi did not show and his whereabouts remained unknown. He was rumored to be in Ubari with the pro-Gaddafi Tuareg commander, Ali Kanna. In August 2017, Libyan Herald refuted claim that he was ever in Ubari and reported that he was instead in the Wershefana region west of Tripoli. However, Wershefana sources denied this and claimed that he was in Bani Walid. Bani Walid sources claimed that Gaddafi had asked to go there, but was rejected as some elders feared it would divide the community and risk attack.

In October 2017, Ghassan Salamé, the head of United Nations Support Mission in Libya, asserted that Gaddafi might be allowed to take part in the political reconstruction of Libya.

In December 2017, Gaddafi allegedly claimed to a US source that he was building an army and his forces had taken control of Sabratha. His claim was unverified and it was possible that he was taking credit for other armed groups' operations. He was allegedly aligned with the Warshefana tribal militia, but Warshefana had gotten into a turf war with his other ally the Zintan Brigades over road checkpoints and smuggling routes.

On 17 February 2018, on the seventh anniversary of the outbreak of the First Libyan Civil War, Asharq Al-Awsat reported from tribal sources that several international parties were prodding extremists linked to al-Qaeda to assassinate Gaddafi. The same sources refused to divulge Gaddafi's whereabouts.

Gaddafi's spokesman stated on 22 March 2018 in Tunis that he would run for president in the next Libyan general election under the Popular Front for the Liberation of Libya (PFLL). Ayman Abu Ras, a spokesperson for the party, said that Gaddafi wished to focus on a programme of "reform", namely reconstruction projects.

In May 2018, the ICC reminded Libyan authorities of the arrest warrant issued against Gaddafi, calling for him to be arrested and transferred to the custody of the ICC. The ICC also called for "credible information" that could lead to finding his location.

In July 2018, an audio recording of Gaddafi imploring the Tuaregs in Ghat to provide him with fighters was leaked online.

In May 2019, the son of Mohammed Ali Madani alleged that Khalifa Haftar had offered him and Ejmi al-Atiri money to assassinate Gaddafi.

In March 2020, the ICC confirmed that Gaddafi's case was admissible in the ICC, despite the 28 July 2015 Libyan judgment against him, since the 2015 judgment was carried out in absentia, thus not qualifying as final under Libyan law.

In May 2020, it was reported that Turkish intelligence was searching for Gaddafi in the western mountain region southwest of Tripoli to either assassinate him or hand him over to the ICC.

In 2020, Gaddafi reportedly attempted to re-organize the Popular Front for the Liberation of Libya into a new party named "Libya Al-Ghad" ("Libya Tomorrow" in Arabic), but the rebrand was vetoed by the much older Popular Front leaders.

On 14 February 2021, Gaddafi's lawyer Karim Khan was elected Prosecutor of the International Criminal Court. Khan subsequently recused himself from Gaddafi's ICC case.

=== Re-emergence as a public figure and presidential campaign ===
On 11 June 2021, The Times spoke exclusively with political representatives of Gaddafi, who revealed that he was planning to make a return to public life, including possibly running for president, and had been courting foreign diplomats to re-establish his viability. A direct phone call between The Times reporters and Gaddafi was subsequently arranged, where he confirmed his identity and his relationship with the group of aides The Times had been speaking with. He also stated that he was in good health.

In a July 2021 interview with The New York Times, his first interview with western media in ten years, Gaddafi attacked Libyan politicians for their governance since the 2011 First Libyan Civil War, describing them as having "raped the country". Gaddafi hinted that he was running for president. Commenting on his years-long absence from public life, he said "You need to come back slowly, slowly. Like a striptease. You need to play with their minds a little." The July 2021 New York Times interview included topics related to Gaddafi's political thinking and past actions. Gaddafi defended his father's legacy. Gaddafi said of his father's Green Book; "It was not crazy, it talked about things everybody is now recognizing." He said that many "ideas gaining popularity in the West, such as frequent public referendums, employee stock-ownership programs and the dangers of boxing and wrestling", echoed the words of his father's book. His interview was given to the New York Times at an opulent two-story villa inside a gated compound in Zintan. According to The New York Times, Gaddafi reluctantly agreed to be photographed for the interview, but insisted on covering part of his face with a scarf. Until the interview, Gaddafi had not been seen since June 2014, when he appeared via video link from Zintan during his trial by the Tripoli court.

Some Libyans questioned the authenticity of photographs taken by The New York Times. Ashraf Boudwara, head of the Preparatory Committee for the National Conference, claimed the photos were of Gaddafi's brother Saadi Gaddafi. Meanwhile, Gaddafi loyalists celebrated Gaddafi's return. Saad al-Senussi al-Barasi, a leader in the Popular Front for the Liberation of Libya, called the skeptics of the photographs, "the enemies of the nation and those who cling to power."

In October 2021, the Israel Hayom reported that a female model representing Gaddafi signed a contract with an Israeli consulting firm to run his presidential campaign.

On 14 November 2021, making his first public appearance since June 2014, Gaddafi confirmed his intention to run for the presidency of Libya, registering his nomination in the southern city of Sebha. On 16 November, Libya's High National Election Commission rejected Gaddafi's candidacy on grounds that under Libyan law, his criminal convictions disqualified him from holding a political office. On 25 November, gunmen aligned with Khalifa Haftar, under Haftar's sons' command, stormed the courthouse of Sabha and threatened judges and staffers to prevent them from ruling on Gaddafi's appeal. The United Nations Support Mission in Libya expressed concerns over the forced closure of the Sabha court and warned that sanctions could be levied against parties responsible. On 28 November, Gaddafi stated to Al Arabiya that Libyan judicial authorities refused to hold hearings on his disqualification appeal.

On 2 December 2021, a Libyan court ruled that Gaddafi be reinstated as a presidential candidate. Al-Araby Al-Jadeed reported that Gaddafi had secretly visited Egypt and met with President of Egypt Abdel Fattah el-Sisi and Egyptian Chief of Intelligence Abbas Kamel before his reinstatement.

On 29 January 2022, through a statement published by his lawyer Khalid al-Zaidi, Gaddafi proposed an initiative to resolve the political crisis that began after presidential elections scheduled for December 2021 were delayed. The initiative proposed postponing presidential elections and proceeding with parliamentary elections without delay.

On 6 July 2022, Gaddafi presented two separate proposals to resolve the ongoing Libyan crisis through a written statement disseminated by his lawyer Khalid al-Zaidi. In the first proposal, Gaddafi argued for the appointment of a neutral party to oversee urgent, non-exclusive presidential and parliamentary elections in which everyone would be allowed to participate. In the second proposal, Gaddafi recommended that all current political figures, including himself, should collectively withdraw from the electoral process in order to make way for new faces chosen by the Libyan people through transparent elections.

In August 2022, Gaddafi, through his lawyer Khaled al-Zaidi, denied a report from Jeune Afrique that he had made a deal with Lebanon to secure his brother Hannibal's release.

In December 2022, Abdul Hamid Dbeibeh called for Gaddafi to surrender himself to the ICC. In January 2023, Gaddafi's political team reiterated his legal right to run for political office despite the ICC arrest warrant.

In July 2023, Gaddafi called for Lebanon to release his brother Hannibal from detention, describing Hannibal's incarceration as "illegal and inhumane" and "without trial and without just cause."

In September 2023, Gaddafi blamed the 2011 Libyan civil war which deposed his father and the instability which followed the conflict for the Derna dam collapses. He called the country's rival governments "sham governments" and accused the Derna security forces and the forces of Khalifa Haftar of making the situation worse by imposing a curfew on the city rather than evacuating it.

=== Russian ties ===
In May 2019, two Russians affiliated with Yevgeny Prigozhin and the Wagner Group, Maxim Shugaley and Samer Hasan Ali Sueyfan, were arrested in Tripoli for conspiring with Gaddafi. They were released in December 2020.

In September 2020, Corriere della Sera reported that a Russian airplane took Gaddafi from Zintan to Moscow to hold secret meetings. In June 2021, Mahmoud Refaat claimed that Gaddafi had secretly visited Damascus to meet with senior figures of the Bashar al-Assad regime. The secret meeting was brokered by Russia. On 12 August 2021, prosecutors in Tripoli issued an arrest warrant for Gaddafi over suspected links to the Wagner Group.

In March 2023, Al-Jazeera revealed the testimonies of Wagner operative Maxim Shugaley, who alleged that Gaddafi had given Russia incriminating evidence that implicated prominent politicians in France, the US, and Ukraine. Most notably, the President of France, Emmanuel Macron, was accused of accepting Libyan money through Algerian intermediaries to fund his campaign in the 2017 French presidential election.

== Assassination ==
On 3 February 2026, it was reported that Gaddafi had been shot and killed at his private garden in Zintan, Libya, by four gunmen, who then fled the scene. Gaddafi reportedly attempted to fight back but was eventually killed, the time of his death estimated at 2:30 a.m. The attackers had disabled security cameras at his residence prior to his killing. On 6 February 2026, he was buried in Bani Walid, next to his younger brother Khamis Gaddafi.

In the assault, the guardian of the site Ajmeri Al-Atiri, leader of the Abou Bakr al-Ṣiddīq local militia, and his son Mohammed were also killed. The Public Prosecution Office in Tripoli announced that an official investigation into Gaddafi's assassination had begun. The 444th Infantry Brigade denied involvement in the assassination.

== Personal life ==
There are two different stories about his mother's origin. One is that his mother, Safia Farkash, is from a family from the Eastern Libyan Barasa tribe and that she was born in Bayda and was trained as a nurse. The other is that she is of Croatian-Hungarian descent.

In 2006, the German newspaper Der Spiegel and the Spanish newspaper La Voz de Galicia reported that Gaddafi was romantically linked to Orly Weinerman, an Israeli actress and model, they dated from 2005 to 2011. At the time, Weinerman publicly denied having any contact with Gaddafi, but she has since admitted it, and in September 2012, she asked former British prime minister Tony Blair to intervene in his trial in order to spare his life.

In 2009, a party in Montenegro for his 37th birthday included well-known guests such as Oleg Deripaska, Peter Munk and Prince Albert of Monaco.

In April 2016, the Italian newspaper Corriere della Sera reported that Gaddafi had married in Zintan and had a three-year-old daughter. In his 2021 interview with The New York Times, Gaddafi denied being married and claimed that he was lonely.

He is rumored to have been living in a pied-à-terre near Zintan or further south in the village of Qira, the native village of Abdullah Senussi. His former captor, Ejmi al-Atiri of the Zintan Brigades, provided him with bodyguards, along with the Mashashiya tribe and Russian forces. According to Ejmi al-Atiri, Gaddafi developed the hobbies of camping, night rides in the desert, hunting, and reading after his release from prison.

According to The Times in 2017, Gaddafi had access to up to $30 billion.

=== British society ===
In the 2000s, Gaddafi was hosted at Buckingham Palace and Windsor Castle by the British royal family. He also went shooting on Princess Anne's estate in Gloucestershire.

In 2009, he spent a weekend at Waddesdon Manor, home of financier Jacob Rothschild, 4th Baron Rothschild, where he was the guest of Peter Mandelson and Nathaniel Rothschild. He later stayed at the Rothschild holiday home in Corfu. Nathaniel Rothschild was a guest at Gaddafi's 37th birthday celebration in Montenegro.

In May 2010, Gaddafi and British supermodel Naomi Campbell corresponded by e-mail to coordinate Ghislaine Maxwell's visit to Libya.

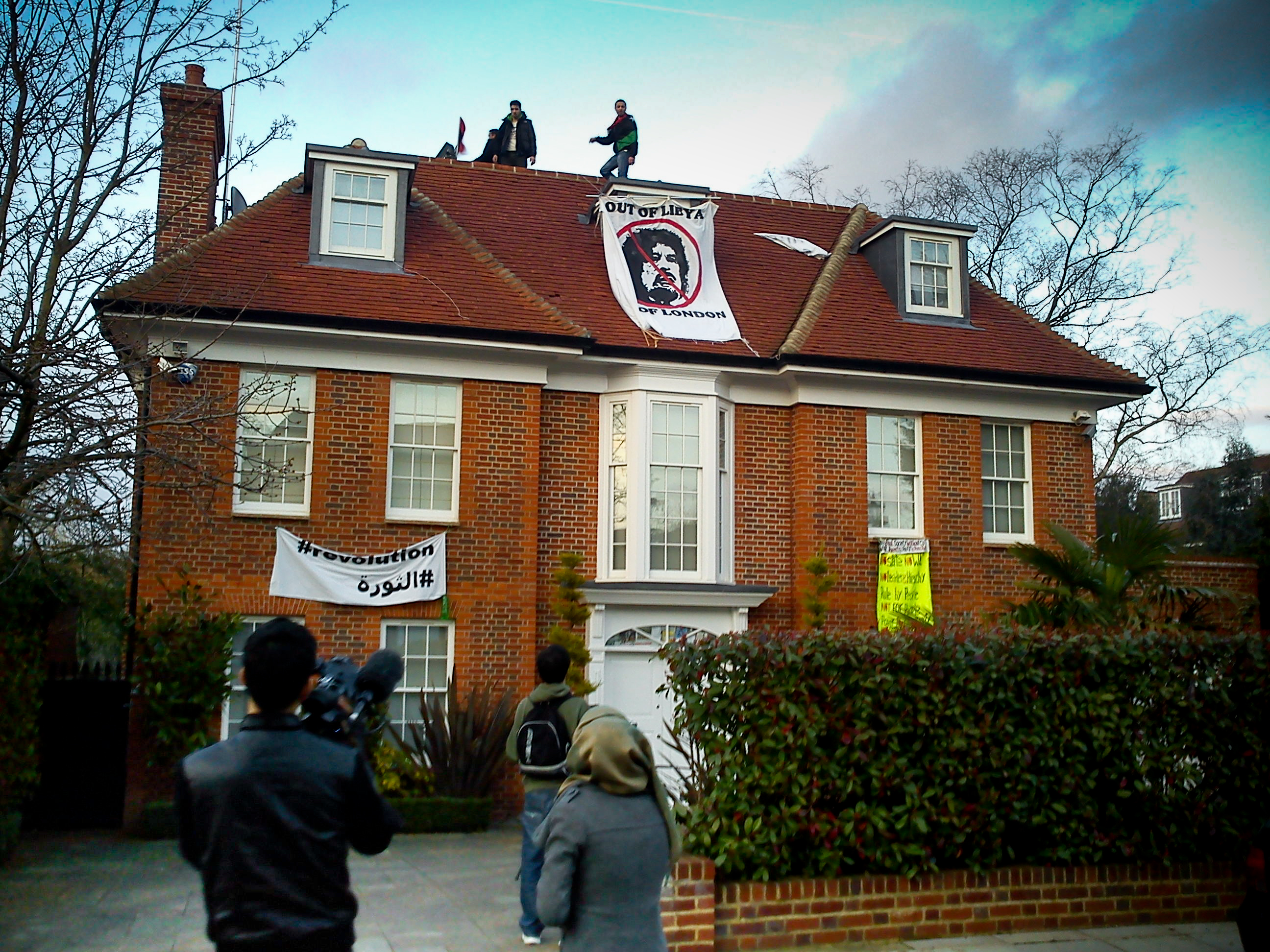
Protest at Gaddafi's London home, 2011

He owned a £10.9 million mansion in the Hampstead Garden Suburb area of London. The property was seized in 2011 and remained unoccupied as of 2022.

=== Influence over Gaddafi legacy ===
Even prior to the 2011 Libya uprising, Gaddafi was regarded as his father's heir apparent. By the time of his trial in 2015, The Guardian pointed that Gaddafi had in fact "once thought he would rule Libya." At the time of death in February 2026, Saif was acknowledged to be the only person who was capable of unifying Gaddafi loyalists. As a result, his death would mark the end of Gaddafi loyalists being able to have a single "unifying figure" to rally behind. It was also further noted at the time of his death that Gaddafi was still regarded as his father's "heir apparent."

== Links with the London School of Economics ==
Gaddafi received his PhD from the London School of Economics (LSE) in 2008. Through the Gaddafi International Charity and Development Foundation (GICDF), Gaddafi pledged a donation of £1.5 million to support the work of the LSE's Centre for the Study of Global Governance on civil society organisations in North Africa. Following the LSE–Gaddafi affair, the LSE issued a statement indicating that it would cut all financial ties with the country and would accept no further money from the GICDF, having already received and spent the first £300,000 instalment of the donation.

Critics have charged that Gaddafi plagiarized portions of his doctoral dissertation and pressure was put on the LSE to revoke his degree. The LSE set up a review process to evaluate the plagiarism charges in early 2011. In November 2011, the review panel stated that the PhD thesis had been "annotated to show where attribution or references should have been made" and recommended that the PhD itself "should not be revoked".

== See also ==
- Alleged Libyan interference in the 2007 French elections
