= Fezzan campaign =

Part of the First Libyan Civil War

- Part of Libyan Civil War
Date	17 July – 27 September 2011
Location	Fezzan, Libya
Result	Anti-Gaddafi victory: Anti-Gaddafi forces capture and hold Qatrun from 17–23 July; Pro-Gaddafi forces push back rebels from Qatrun to the south; Anti-Gaddafi forces capture Murzuk on 17 August; Anti-Gaddafi forces attacked and captured the Wadi al Shatii District mid-September; Anti-Gaddafi forces capture Sabha on 22 September; Anti-Gaddafi forces capture the Ghat and Jufra districts in late September

Belligerents
(Libya) National Transitional Council (until August 28); Libya (from August 28): National Liberation Army; Toubou tribesmen	(Libya) Libyan government (until August 28) (Libya) Gaddafi loyalists (from August 28): Libyan Armed Forces; Paramilitary forces

Commanders and leaders
(Libya) Barka Wardougou (Libya) Khalifa Haftar	(Libya) Massoud Abdelhafid (Libya) Ali Kanna (Libya) Belqasem Al-Abaaj (POW)

Casualties and losses
28 killed, 44 wounded	51 killed

The Fezzan campaign was a military campaign conducted by the National Liberation Army to take control of southwestern Libya during the Libyan Civil War. During April to June 2011, anti-Gaddafi forces gained control of most of the eastern part of the southern desert region (i.e. the southern part of Cyrenaica) during the Cyrenaican desert campaign. In July, Qatrun changed to anti-Gaddafi control on 17 July and back to pro-Gaddafi control on 23 July. In late August, anti- and pro-Gaddafi forces struggled for control of Sabha.

== Background ==
Before the war, parts of southern Libya were known for being almost lawless, and travel was often restricted in some areas due to the presence of bands of militants and bandits (often filtering across the border from Algeria) roaming the desert between towns. Clashes between Islamic militants linked to Al-Qaeda and Libyan security forces occurred several times near the town of Ghat in the years leading up to the conflict. Further south, near the border with Chad, the terrain is made hazardous by landmines in the desert left over from the 1978–1987 Chadian-Libyan conflict. The far south also lacks paved roads and functioning mobile phone services, making communication difficult even in peacetime.

== Preceding events ==
Following the Cyrenaican desert campaign mounted by loyalist forces, focus shifted to the southern part of the Libyan Desert. By mid-June 2011, the Eastern Desert was under the control of forces answering to the National Transitional Council in Benghazi. Clashes in Sabha, the largest city in the Fezzan, in mid-June suggested previously unknown vulnerabilities in a settlement thought to be a loyalist stronghold. Although anti-Gaddafi activists and fighters in Sabha were successfully suppressed, the NTC suggested that the bold attempt at uprising was indicative of cracks in Gaddafi's support base in the oasis city.

== The campaign ==
Moving out of Kufra, a population center in the southeastern desert, rebel forces moved through Murzuq District along the international border with Chad and Niger in mid-July 2011. They secured the Tumu border crossing and took Qatrun on 17 July, without a shot, also capturing a military airfield and outpost at Al Wigh near the Niger border. Pro-Gaddafi forces were believed to have withdrawn to Traghan in order to block a suspected rebel advance on Sabha, but rebel forces bypassed Traghan in their northward press in order to capture the village of Umm Al Aranib as a forward base.

Loyalist forces attacked Qatrun three times before finally recapturing it on 23 July. Toubou tribesmen, who declared support for the National Transitional Council, retreated to the south of the town, leaving about 20,000 civilians trapped between them and the army. At least two people are thought to have been killed and eight wounded in the final attack to retake the town.

On 5 August, Alain Juppé, the French foreign minister, claimed that the southern regions of Libya are "practically under the NTC's control". There was no confirmation of the claim by either independent media, the loyalists or the rebels.

Toubou tribal fighters reportedly captured Murzuk.

=== Jufra ===
At least one NTC official suggested that the Jufra District, including Hun, Waddan, and neighbouring towns, as well as the Al Jufra Air Base, was a key target, more valuable than Bani Walid or Sirte. On 19 September, NTC forces took over Zella, an oasis town near the Jufra area, Al Jazeera reported. On 21 September, pro-Gaddafi forces shelled the town of Hun after NTC forces reportedly took control of it. On the same day, the NTC announced that they took control over the town of Jufra and surrounding area. This was later confirmed at a NATO press conference by Lieutenant General Charles Bouchard.

=== Sabha ===
Several months after clashes occurred in the southern Libyan city of Sabha in June, Libyan opposition forces reported fierce fighting between revolutionary fighters and forces loyal to Muammar Gaddafi on 23 August. Several days later, on 25 August, rebels claimed to have again captured the outpost of Al Wigh, several hundred kilometres south of Sabha, towards the Libya/Chad/Niger tripoint.

On 28 August, three NLA soldiers were killed in the city of Sabha after they ran out of ammunition. Pro-Gaddafi brigades were joined by reinforcements from other towns. On the same day, Colonel Bani of the NLA forces said that they would "advance on" Sabha after taking control of Sirte on the coast.

On 4 September, NLA forces claimed that they had surrounded Sabha. The city would receive humanitarian aid but has one week to surrender.

On 19 September, spokesman for NTC Ministry of Defence, Col. Ahmed Bani, announced at a press conference that NTC fighters managed to capture Sabha airport and fort. There was no immediate independent verification of his claims.

On 20 September, NTC forces entered the city of Sabha, taking the city center with little resistance. A CNN reporter accompanied NTC forces, confirming the reports. An NTC military spokesman in Benghazi said Sabha Airport was under the control of anti-Gaddafi fighters, but fighting was continuing in some quarters of the city proper.

=== Brak ===
On 14 September, an NTC Commander said an anti-Gaddafi column 500 strong (coming from the north/Mizda region) had captured the military air-base at Brak in south-central Libya, some 50 kilometres north of Sabha. The NTC commander (Ahamda Almagri) also said two Gaddafi loyalists were arrested, while 70 loyalists fled the air-base, the second-largest in the south of Libya. On the morning of 15 September, anti-Gaddafi forces entered the city itself where fighting erupted.

On 16 September, anti-Gaddafi forces had taken control over the towns of Brak and Gira, just 50 kilometers north of Sabha. During the fighting, incoming rocket fire struck the airbase, that the rebels captured the day before, which ignited the underground ammunition stores that held thousands of artillery rounds causing massive explosions. A day later, on 17 September, the rest of the towns in Wadi al Shatii District were peacefully taken by NTC forces.

=== Murzuq ===
On 21 September, after NTC forces have taken control of Sabha, Desert Shield Brigade spokesman in Benghazi said that NTC forces moved from Sabha south and engaged pro-Gaddafi loyalists in town Traghan, between Umm al-Aranib and capital city of district Murzuq.

=== Ubari ===
On 22 September, an NTC commander in Sabha told CNN correspondent Ben Wedeman that his forces have taken control over the town of Ubari, the capital of the Wadi al Hayaa District.

=== Ghat ===
By 25 September, fighting moved onto the border town of Ghat where the last remnants of pro-Gaddafi loyalists in Fezzan were claimed to be stationed. The same day, NTC forces took control over Ghat airport, located north of the city and a day later Ghat itself and the Tinkarine border crossing with Algeria.
