= List of airports in Libya =

List of airports in Libya sorted by location.

== Airports ==
Airport names shown in bold indicate the airport has scheduled service on commercial airlines.

Location	ICAO	IATA	Airport name
Kufra			Maaten al-Sarra Air Base
Bani Walid			Bani Walid Airport
Bayda	HLLQ	LAQ	**Al Abraq International Airport**
Benghazi	HLLB	BEN	**Benina International Airport**
Brak		BCQ	Brak Airport
Brega	HLMB	LMQ	Marsa Brega Airport
Derna			Martuba Air Base
Ghadames	HLTD	LTD	**Ghadames Airport**
Ghat	HLGT	GHT	**Ghat Airport**
Hun	HLON	HUQ	Hun Airport
Hun	HLJF		Al Jufra Air Base
Kufra	HLKF	AKF	**Kufra Airport**
Misrata	HLMS	MRA	**Misrata International Airport**
Mizda			Habit Awlad Muhammad Airport
Zuwara			Okba Ibn Nafa Air Base
Ra's Lanuf	HLNF		Ra's Lanuf Airport
Sabha	HLLS	SEB	**Sabha Airport**
Sirte	HLGD	SRX	**Gardabya Airport**
Tobruk	HLGN	TOB	**Tobruk Airport**
Tripoli	HLLM	MJI	**Mitiga International Airport**
Tripoli	HLLT	TIP	Tripoli International Airport
Ubari	HLUB	QUB	**Ubari Airport**
Waddan	HLWN		Waddan Airport
Zintan	HLZN	ZIS	**Alzintan Airport**
Zuwarah	HLZW	WAX	Zuwarah Airport
