= Mizda–Brak Road =

Road in Libya

Location
- Country: Libya

Highway system
- Transport in Libya

Mizda–Brak Road is an asphalt road in west-central Libya running south from Mizda near the coast to Brak through Shuwairif.

The road reduced the travel distance between Tripoli and Sabha to 780 km, from the former 933 km via the Fezzan Road and Abu Qurayn.

The Mizda–Brak Road was constructed in two sections between 1976 and 1985.

- The Mizda–Shuwairif section was built between the years 1976–1980.
- The Shuwairif–Brak section was built between the years 1980–1985.
