= Sabha =

Sabha may refer to:

- Sabhā, Sanskritic term for a council, assembly, congregation, or society
- Lok Sabha, lower house of the Parliament of India
- Pratinidhi Sabha, House of Representatives of the Federal Parliament of Nepal
- Rajya Sabha, upper house of the Parliament of India
- Rastriya Sabha, upper house of the Federal Parliament of Nepal

== Geography ==
- Sabha, Libya, city in Sabha District, Libya
  - Sabha Airbase, Libyan Air Force base in Sabha
  - Sabha Airport, an airport in Sabha
  - Sabha University, a university in Sabha
  - Battle of Sabha, a battle in Sabha during the First Libyan Civil War
- Sabha Governorate, former governorate of Libya
- Sabha District, one of the districts of Libya

== Other ==
- RBNS Sabha, lead ship of the Royal Bahraini Naval Service Fleet
- Sabha Parva, a book of the Mahabharata
