= Waddan Airport =

- IATA: none; ICAO: HL72

Summary
- Airport type: Public
- Serves: Waddan, Libya
- Elevation AMSL: 910 ft / 277 m
- Coordinates: 29°08′20″N 16°09′35″E

Map
- Location of the airport in Libya

Runways
Direction	Length		Surface
Direction	m	ft	Surface
11/29	2,000	6,562	Asphalt
- Source: Google Maps GCM

Waddan Airport (ICAO: HL72) is an airport serving the town of Waddan in the Jufra District of Libya. The airport is 3 kilometres (1.9 mi) south of the town.

The Hon non-directional beacon (Ident: HON) is located 11 nautical miles (20 km) west of the airport.

== See also ==
- Transport in Libya
- List of airports in Libya
