= Samno =

Samno سمنو Samnu
- Town
- Location in Libya
- Coordinates: 27°16′34″N 14°52′57″E
- Country: Libya
- Region: Fezzan
- Time zone: UTC+2
- License Plate Code: 24

Samno (Arabic: سمنو) is a Libyan village located 60 km northeast of Sebha, 10 km south of the Zigan Oasis, and 30 km from the Tamnhent Oasis. These oases (Samno, Zigan, and Tamnhent) form part of the Wadi al-Bawanis, stretching from Jufra in the north to Ghdoua and Tamsa in the south.

To the west of Samno, sand dunes extend over vast distances, eventually forming the Zlaf Sand Sea, passing through the Tamnhent Oasis. To the east, the land is covered with gravel at times, and at other times with solid rocks, marking the beginning of the Qatusa stream bed extension.
