= Tajarhi =

Tajarhi تجرهي
- Village
- Location in Libya
- Coordinates: 24°15′44″N 14°33′37″E
- Country: Libya
- Region: Fezzan
- District: Murzuq
- Elevation: 1,710 ft (520 m)

Population (2006)
  - Total: 1,496
- Time zone: UTC+2 (EET)

Tajarhi, Tegerhi or Tajirhi (Arabic: تجرهي) is an oasis and crossroads village in the Murzuq District of Libya. It lies in the Sahara Desert and is the last refueling point in Libya before reaching Madama, the first station in Niger (after the unpopulated frontier station at Tumu), some 282 kilometers to the south, or 361 km by track. Tajarhi has an airstrip (HL-57) south of town.

== History ==
Tajarhi was and still is the southernmost village in Fezzan, located at the desert trade routes to the Niger River, Lake Chad and the Sudan. Among the goods traded north were slaves, and the trade in slaves through Tajarhi increased after Tunisia and Algeria abolished the trade in 1846 and 1848, respectively. Tajarhi was described by British naval officer George Francis Lyon in 1819 as a lush oasis with groves of date palms and wild ducks on the brackish lakes.

Beginning in 2004, a paved road has been built from al-Qatrun via Tajahi up until the Libyan border with Niger at Tumu. In this section, the long-distance road directly follows the very old caravan route from Tripoli/Sirte in the North to Lake Chad in the South, also known as Bilma Trail or Garamantean Road.
