= Shaba North =

Rocket launch site

- Kapani Tonneo
- Location within Democratic Republic of the Congo
- Formation: 1976
- Type: rocket launch site
- Coordinates: 7.9239844°S 28.5360758°E
- Owner: OTRAG

Shaba North (also mentioned as Kapani Tonneo) was the launch site of the first rockets launched by Orbital Transport und Raketen AktienGesellschaft, or Orbital Forwarding Company in English ("OTRAG").

It is located at the edge of a mesa in Shaba (now Katanga province), the Democratic Republic of Congo. In 1976 Luvua Airport was built to supply the site.

In 1977 and in 1978 three test flights of OTRAG rockets were launched from Shaba North.

In 1979 OTRAG stopped launching rockets from Shaba North after pressure from the Soviet Union, whose leaders were concerned about German interests obtaining powerful long-range rockets. Its launching activities were later moved to Sabha, Libya.

== Launches ==
Three test flights were launched from Shaba North.

Date	OTRAG version	Apogee	Details
1977 May 18	4x9m	15 km	Four-module test vehicle, 6 m long; propulsion test
1978 May 19	4x9m	30 km	Four-module test vehicle, 6 m long; high altitude night test
1978 Jun 5	4x15m	0	Lost control and crashed in seconds

== Nearest locations ==
- Luvua Airport
- Kalemie
