= Massoud Abdelhafid =

Libyan general

Lieutenant General Massoud Abdelhafid
- مسعود عبد الحافظ
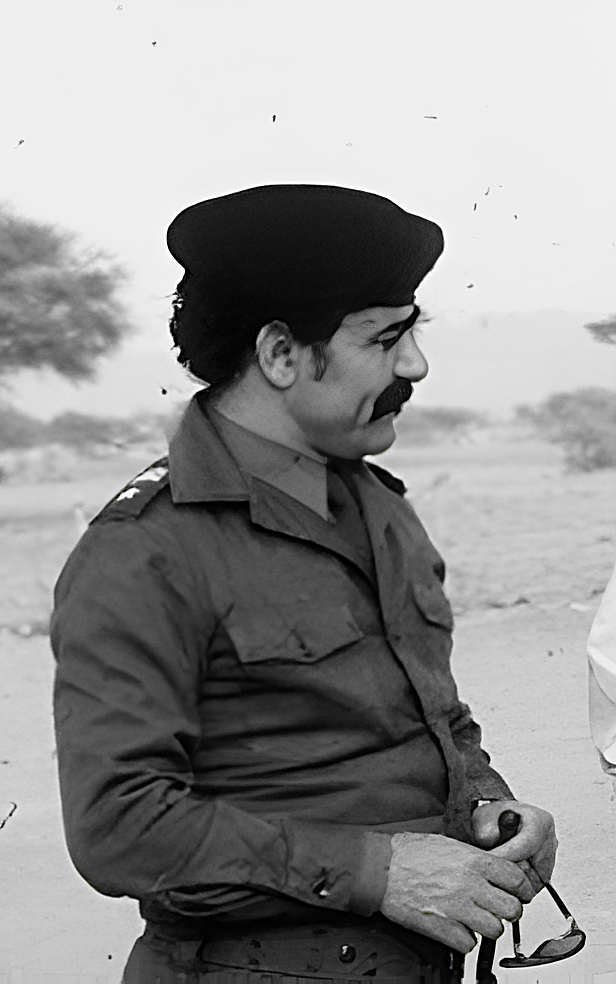
- Abdelhafid in 1983

Minister of the Interior
- In office ?–2011

Personal details
- Born: Massoud Abdelhafid Ahmed; January 1, 1937 Sirte, Italian Libya
- Died: January 14, 2015 (aged 78) Qasr Abu Hadi, Libya
- Party: Arab Socialist Union (Libya)
- Nickname: Mr. Chad

Military service
- Allegiance: Libyan Arab Jamahiriya
- Branch/service: Libyan Army (1951–2011)
- Years of service: 1969–2011
- Rank: Lieutenant General
- Commands: Ministry of Interior; Governor of Fezzan Region
- Battles/wars: 1969 Libyan Revolution; Chadian-Libyan conflict First Libyan Civil War

Massoud Abdelhafid (Arabic: مسعود عبد الحافظ, romanized: Masʿūd ʻAbd al-Ḥafīẓ) was a Libyan army general during the government of Muammar Gaddafi. He held various major positions in the government following the 1969 coup d'état of Muammar Gaddafi, including Commander of Military Security, Governor of Fezzan and Head of Security in major cities. He was a prominent figure in Libya and played a major role in building relations with neighboring countries Chad and Sudan. Massoud Abdelhafid was a senior commander in the Libyan Army during the Chadian–Libyan conflict. Known for his leadership of Libyan-backed insurrections and wars in Chad, he was referred to as "Mr. Chad". He played many major roles in the military and the Government, and was the third in-Command of the Libyan military during the Gaddafi regime. He was considered a key figure during the regime. He married the sister of Ahmad Gaddaf-Al Dam.

== 2011 Libyan civil war ==
Following the defection of Abdul Fatah Younis, Gaddafi designated Abdelhafid as interior minister. General Massoud Abdelhafid led the pro-Gaddafi forces in the region of Fezzan during the Battle of Sabha and the Fezzan campaign.

Abdelhafid was reported to have fled to Egypt, after the fall of Sabha, alongside Interior Minister Nassr al-Mabrouk Abdullah.
