= Hun Airport =

Airport in the Jufra District, Libya

- IATA: HUQ; ICAO: HLON

Summary
- Airport type: Public
- Serves: Hun, Libya
- Elevation AMSL: 919 ft / 280 m
- Coordinates: 29°06′40″N 15°57′50″E

Map
- Location of the airport in Libya

Runways
Direction	Length		Surface
Direction	m	ft	Surface
13/31	1,800	5,906	Asphalt
- Source: Google Maps SkyVector

Hun Airport (IATA: HUQ, ICAO: HLON) is an airport serving Hun, capital of the Jufra District in Libya. The runway is just southeast of the city.

The Hon non-directional beacon (Ident: HON) is located 1.6 nautical miles (3.0 km) northwest of the airport.

== See also ==
- Transport in Libya
- List of airports in Libya
