= HUQ =

HUQ may refer to:

- Huq, a surname
- Tsat language, spoken in China
- Hun Airport, in Libya
