= Brak Airport =

- IATA: BCQ; ICAO: none

Summary
- Airport type: Public
- Serves: Brak
- Elevation AMSL: 1,482 ft / 452 m
- Coordinates: 27°39′10″N 14°16′15″E

Map
- Location of the airport in Libya

Runways
Direction	Length		Surface
Direction	m	ft	Surface
13/31	3,600	11,811	Asphalt
- Source: Google Maps GCM

Brak Airport (IATA: BCQ) is an airport serving Brak, the capital of the Wadi al Shatii District in Libya. The airport is in the desert 11 kilometres (6.8 mi) north of the city.

Runway length does not include a 245 metres (804 ft) displaced threshold on each end.

The Sebha VOR-DME (Ident: SEB) is located 42.7 nautical miles (79.1 km) south-southeast of the airport.

== See also ==
- Transport in Libya
- List of airports in Libya
