= Battle of Sabha =

2011 battle in Libya

- Part of the Fezzan campaign of the Libyan Civil War
- Battle of Sabha (Libya)
Date	19–22 September 2011
Location	Sabha, Libya
Result	Anti-Gaddafi victory

Belligerents
(Libya) Anti-Gaddafi forces; Fighters from the Ouled Slimane tribe; National Liberation Army; NATO command	(Libya) Libyan government; Libyan Army; Pro-Gaddafi tribes

Commanders and leaders
(Libya) Bashir Ahwaz (Libya) Ahmed al-Ataybi (Libya) Khalifa Haftar	(Libya) Massoud Abdelhafid (Libya) Ali Kanna

Strength
Unknown	300

Casualties and losses
18 killed	19 killed 150 captured

The Battle of Sabha was a part of the Libyan Civil War and took place between forces loyal to Libyan leader Muammar Gaddafi and rebel anti-Gaddafi forces for the control of the desert oasis city of Sabha. It was the second conflict in the city since the start of the war after the 2011 Sabha clashes.

== Background ==
Sabha is located by an oasis in the Libyan Desert and is home to an important military base. Much of its population comprises migrants from Chad, Niger, and Sudan. These migrants had been brought to Libya by Gaddafi in the 1980s and given employment and stipends by the regime to ensure their support. In addition, the city is home to a large number of members of the Qadhadhfa tribe, to which Gaddafi belonged. As a result, the city was regarded as a stronghold of pro-Gaddafi sentiment as the anti-regime protests that began across Libya in February 2011 turned into civil war. As the conflict progressed, however, many of the migrants went north to fight against the rebels, draining Gaddafi's major base of support in the city. Those who remained behind were mostly armed young locals and members of the Awlad Suleiman tribe. The Awlad Suleiman bear strong resentment against the regime. Shortly after Gaddafi seized power, members of the tribe were accused of plotting to overthrow him. Many tribesmen were executed and imprisoned as a result.

Earlier in the conflict, there was a local uprising in the city. Gaddafi's men crushed this uprising, resulting in a temporary peace during which many pro-Gaddafi forces fled to the city after the massive rebel gains of late August, turning the city into a bastion of sorts.

== Lead-up to the battle ==
In late August there were reports of clashes around the city. Gaddafi loyalists retained control of the city. Gaddafi's men were reinforced by troops from elsewhere in the country while the rebels found themselves running low on ammunition and other supplies.

Anti-Gaddafi forces continued to approach the city in early September, with a spokesperson saying that they were fighting at Sabha with "equipment that they did not have". British forces claimed that they had conducted a series of air strikes on pro-Gaddafi targets in and around Sabha, destroying two armoured cars and six tanks among other things.

== Rebel assault on the city ==
On 19 September, spokesman for the NTC Ministry of Defence, Col. Ahmed Bani, announced at a press conference that NTC fighters managed to capture Sabha airport and fort. There was no immediate independent verification of his claims.

On 20 September, NTC forces entered the city of Sabha, taking the city center with little resistance. A CNN reporter accompanied NTC forces, confirming the reports. An NTC military spokesman in Benghazi said Sabha Airport was under the control of anti-Gaddafi fighters, but fighting was continuing in some quarters of the city proper, particularly in the district of al-Manshiya.

Although Sabha was assumed by many to be a pro-Gaddafi stronghold, CNN's Ben Wedeman reported that NTC forces were greeted with cheers from large parts of the local population as they entered the city, and many residents he talked to claimed they had supported the revolution against Gaddafi from the beginning but were unable to demonstrate due to the strong loyalist presence in the city.

On 21 September, the NTC announced that almost the whole of Sabha was under their control, with widespread defections from pro-Gaddafi elements helping to end the battle, and NTC forces were encountering only sporadic resistance from few individuals. Loyalists were still resisting in the Al Manshiya district.

On 22 September, opposition forces cleared the last remaining pockets of resistance in the city. Journalists in the city stated that only a few rogue snipers remained.

== Aftermath ==
On 22 September near Sabha, NTC forces discovered two warehouses containing thousands of blue barrels marked with tape saying "radioactive" and plastic bags of yellow powder sealed with the same tape. The International Atomic Energy Agency (IAEA) stated, "We can confirm that there is yellowcake stored in drums at a site near Sabha ... which Libya previously declared to the IAEA. ... The IAEA has tentatively scheduled safeguards activities at this location once the situation in the country stabilises."

There were rumours about Gaddafi fleeing the town before it was captured by the rebels. Military spokesman Ahmad Bani said that the NTC authorities were investigating the claims.
