= Sabha University =

University in Libya

Sebha University
- Type: Public
- Established: 1983; 43 years ago
- Location: Sabha, Murzuq, Brak and Ghat, Libya
- Website: Sabha University

Sebha University is a public university in the southern city of Sabha, Libya, with campuses in Sabha, Awbari, Murzuq, Brak, and Ghat.

The beginning of Sebha University was in 1976 when the Faculty of Education had been founded as a branch of the University of Tripoli and nucleus for Sebha University later. Sebha University was founded as an independent university in 1983 and included in the beginning both of Faculties of Education and Sciences. Then the Faculties of Medicine, Agriculture, Science of Engineering, Technology, Economics and Accounting were added to Sebha University. So the number of university faculties reached to nineteen faculties located in various areas in the South. The number of students studying in Sebha University until 2016 was (25,726) students

== Faculties ==
Sebha awards Bachelor's degrees and Master's degrees. There are nine faculties, or schools, at Sebha University:

- Agriculture
- Arts
- Economics and Accountancy
- Engineering Science and Technology
- Law
- Medicine
- Physical Education
- Sciences
- Education Awbari
- Education Brak
- Pharmacy
- Education Ghat
- Information Technology

== See also ==
- List of Islamic educational institutions
