= Luvua Airport =

- IATA: none; ICAO: FZRO

Summary
- Airport type: Public
- Serves: Luvua
- Elevation AMSL: 4,298 ft / 1,310 m
- Coordinates: 7°55′50″S 28°31′45″E

Map
- Location of the airport in Democratic Republic of the Congo

Runways
Direction	Length		Surface
Direction	m	ft	Surface
16/34	1,900	6,234	Grass
- Sources: Google Maps GCM

Luvua Airport (ICAO: FZRO) is an airstrip atop a mesa overlooking the Luvua River in Haut-Katanga Province, Democratic Republic of the Congo.

Built and used by the OTRAG (Orbital Transport und Raketen AG) until 1979 with the blessing and support of Mobutu, then President of Zaïre (now Democratic Republic of the Congo).

== See also ==
- Transport in the Democratic Republic of the Congo
- List of airports in the Democratic Republic of the Congo
