= Zella, Libya =

Oasis in Zella

Zella زلة Zillah
- Town
- Location in Libya
- Coordinates: 28°32′56″N 17°33′04″E
- Country: Libya
- Region: Fezzan
- District: Zella

Government
  - Type: Municipality
- Elevation: 2,260 ft (689 m)

Population
  - Estimate (2021): 12,031
- Time zone: UTC+2 (EET)
- Area code: 057

Zella or Zalla (Arabic: زلة az-Zallah) is an oasis in Libya, in the northeastern Fezzan region . The Sahara Desert town is approximately halfway between Marada and Hun in the Jufra District.

== Features ==
Zella is a city in the Midlands of Libya. Situated just North of Haruj Lava ( Called Alharuj Alaswad) is the site of an ancient Berber and Arab castle. There are a number of smaller oases in the vicinity, such as Tirzah, Meduin, Tagreft and Tlesim. Zella is a gateway to Alharuj Al Asswad. There are nearby some Oil and GAs Resources Fields.

== Administration ==
Zella became a municipality in the year 2022. The first governor was elected in 2025.

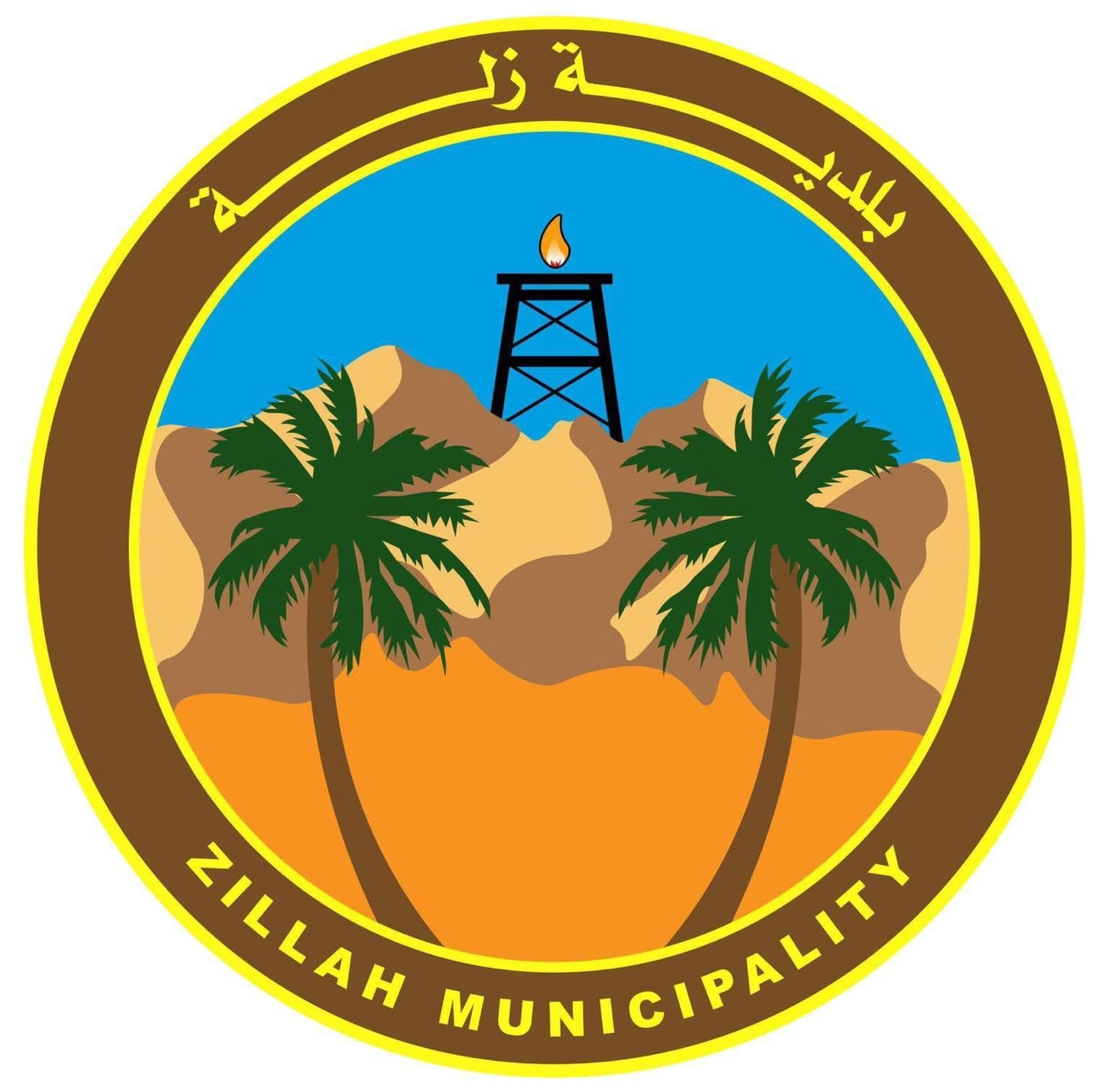

== See also ==
- List of cities in Libya
- Long Range Desert Group
