= Lutz Kayser =

German aerospace engineer (1939–2017)

Lutz Tilo Ferdinand Kayser (March 31, 1939 in Stuttgart, Germany, † November 19, 2017 (aged 78) was a German aerospace engineer, who founded the world's first commercial space launch company, OTRAG.

Lutz Kayser is the uncle of German serial entrepreneur Lin Kayser, who sits on the advisory board of the Munich space launcher company Isar Aerospace, and who also works on liquid rocket engines with his company LEAP 71. His father, the chemist Ludwig Kayser, was the director of the German sugar-producing corporation Suedzucker AG. His brother Manfred Kayser was managing director of the Dornier aircraft factory in Lindau, Germany. He died in November 2017, in the Marshall Islands.
