= 2012 Sabha conflict =

Armed clashes in Fezzan, Libya

- Part of the Post-civil war violence in Libya
Date	25–31 March 2012 (6 days)
Location	Sabha, Libya
Result	Ceasefire: On 31 March Libyan army troops arrive in Sabha to enforce peace between the tribes

Belligerents
Abu Seif tribe	Tubu tribe	(Libya) Libyan National Army: Libyan Air Force

Commanders and leaders
		(Libya) Yousef Mangoush (Libya) Col. Wanis Bukhamada (Libya) Abdurrahman Tawil (Libya) Col. Ali Dallah Gaidi

Strength
		2,000

Casualties and losses
42 killed	48 killed	
- Total casualties: 163 killed and 445 wounded

The 2012 Sabha conflict started in the aftermath of the Libyan civil war, and involved armed clashes between the Tubu and Abu Seif tribes in Sabha, a city of almost 100,000 in the region of Fezzan, Libya. It happened after February 2012 clashes in Kufra, that involved the Tubu people, too. On 27 March, Jomode Elie Getty charged the clashes as "genocide". A Paris-based Tabu official, Jomode Elie Getty, who was an official with the NTC but resigned on Tuesday, accused the NTC of siding with Arabs in attacks on Tabu tribesmen. He called for U.N. intervention.

Issa Abdel Majit Monsur, the head of the Tubu tribe in Libya, announced the reactivation of the "Toubou Front for the Salvation of Libya", an opposition group that was already active during the rule of Muammar Gaddafi. He also announced the possibility of separatist activities. A ceasefire was announced, and as of 1 April the violence had stopped.

== Events ==
Late on 25 March, clashes erupted in the southern city of Sabha, between Libyan government militia in the city and Tubu tribesman, after a man from the Abu Seif tribe was killed in a dispute over a car by the Tubu. The fighting was, at first, mainly on the city outskirts. However, it then spread to the city's main streets and black plumes of smoke could be seen rising from Sabha's airport on 26 March. Initially seven people were reportedly killed and another seven wounded. However, later reports put the death toll at 20 with another 40 people wounded. The Tubu stated that the Abu Seif attacked their negotiation team outside a government building while they were en route to talk about reconciliation.

On 27 March, the fighting in Sabha continued and the toll was reported to have reached 49 dead, with 15 of the killed being from the Tubu and the rest from Abu Seif. Tubu militiamen had reportedly advanced into the center of the city and their snipers had taken up positions, inflicting a number of casualties.

On 28 March, the fighting briefly eased off with reports of a ceasefire, but quickly escalated again. By the end of the day, the toll had reached more than 70 dead and 150 wounded, 40 of the dead being from the Tubu.

On 30 March, ceasefire was negotiated between the Council of Elders of Libya, Sabha local council and members of the Misrata militia in the southern city. According to it, Tubu tribesmen are to withdraw from all areas and recognize the authority of the national army which would take control of all security operations in the south and on the borders. In return, the Tubu will be returned all property in Libya and there will be an investigation into the conflict. Moreover, local militias would be integrated into either Army or Ministry of Interior forces. However, the fighting re-ignited the next day once again.

On 31 March, the Tubus, after being pushed back south of the city, launched a counter-attack in a bid to re-enter the town. 16 people were killed, eight from each side, and more than 50 wounded. The Libyan health minister announced that 147 people had been killed and 395 wounded, up to the night before, since the start of the fighting in Sabha. Later that day, colonel Wanis Bu Khamadh, commander in charge of army units inside the city, said that despite the clashes, the army was able to extend its area of control throughout most of the city and area south of the Sabha. He also claimed that situation de-escalated and army was making a push in order to take under its direct control the whole Fezzan region.

On 2 April, Libyan Prime Minister Abdurrahim El-Keib has visited area and confirmed that fragile peace was so far holding. Meanwhile, National Transitional Council president Mustafa Abdul Jalil declared southern region encompassing cities Wadi al Shatii, Sabha, Ubari, Ghat, and Murzuq military zone where military commander, under which authority falls all armed forces in the region, was appointed by Ministry of Defence instead of regional military councils. The National Liberation Army and Ministry of Interior forces dispatched 2,000 soldiers and border guards to region with Free Libyan Air Force patrolling over the area. Meanwhile, the National Liberation Army was able to secure all areas of Sabha. El-Keib said "every Libyan is important to us. We're going to take care of them like we do take care of any other Libyan, like our brothers and sisters."

Despite the deployment of 2,000 soldiers under the command of Wanis Bukhamada in March, violence has continued, with Bukhamada's home in Benghazi even coming under attack in early September. On 14 September further clashes between the Tebu and a local Arab tribe left 2 head, and on 17 September there was an attempted assassination against Col. Ali Dallah Gaidi, the Head of Sebha Military Council. Gaidi's wife was killed in the attack.
