= Fortress of Ghat =

Fort in Libya

- Ghat, Libya
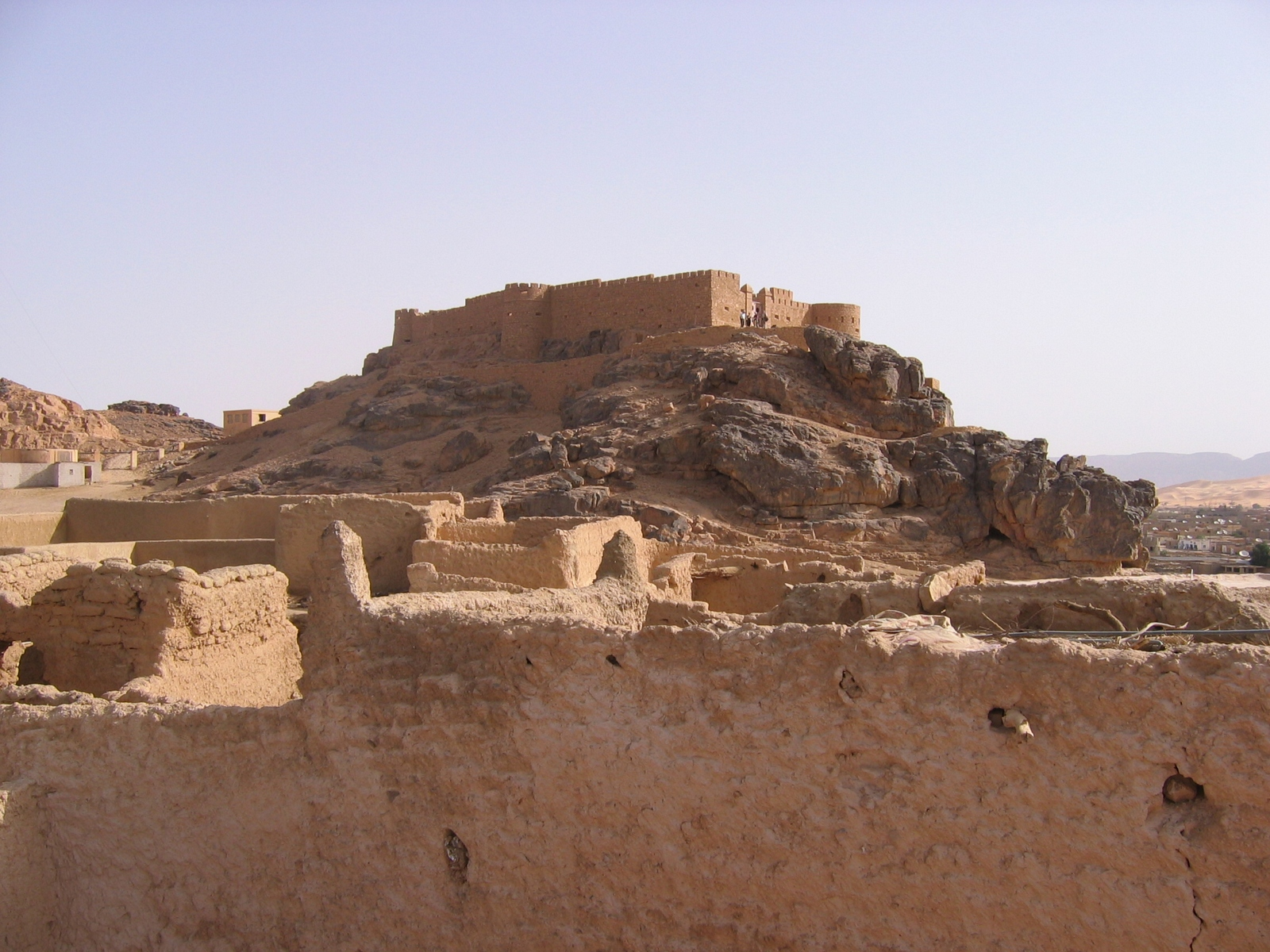
- Fortress of Ghat

Site information
- Type: Fort
- Open to the public: Yes

Location
- Coordinates: 24°58′01″N 10°10′50″E

The Fortress of Ghat is a fort on top of the hill of Koukemen in Ghat, Libya. It was started by the Military of the Ottoman Empire and rebuilt in 1930s after partial destruction caused by the Italian campaign against Libya.

== Summary ==
The Fortress was built by the Ottoman Empire during their rule of Tripoli and Fezzan, and it was destroyed by the Italian colonialists who occupied the city in 1913. It is not excluded that the French also used it during their occupation of Fezzan (1943-1952) after defeating the Italians in the last years of the Second World War. It has been rebuilt and is now a distinctive tourist attraction in the city.

== Location ==
The road to the top of the fortress definitely passes through the paths of the ancient city of Ghat, ‘Agram’, standing at the top of Ghat Fortress can easily get a bird's-eye view of the city and the nearby palm plantations, as well as the Acacus Mountains, with their charming rock carvings, and golden sand dunes, whereas under the fortress’ western wall there is an underground tunnel that might have been used in emergency situations, such as sieges.

== Gallery ==
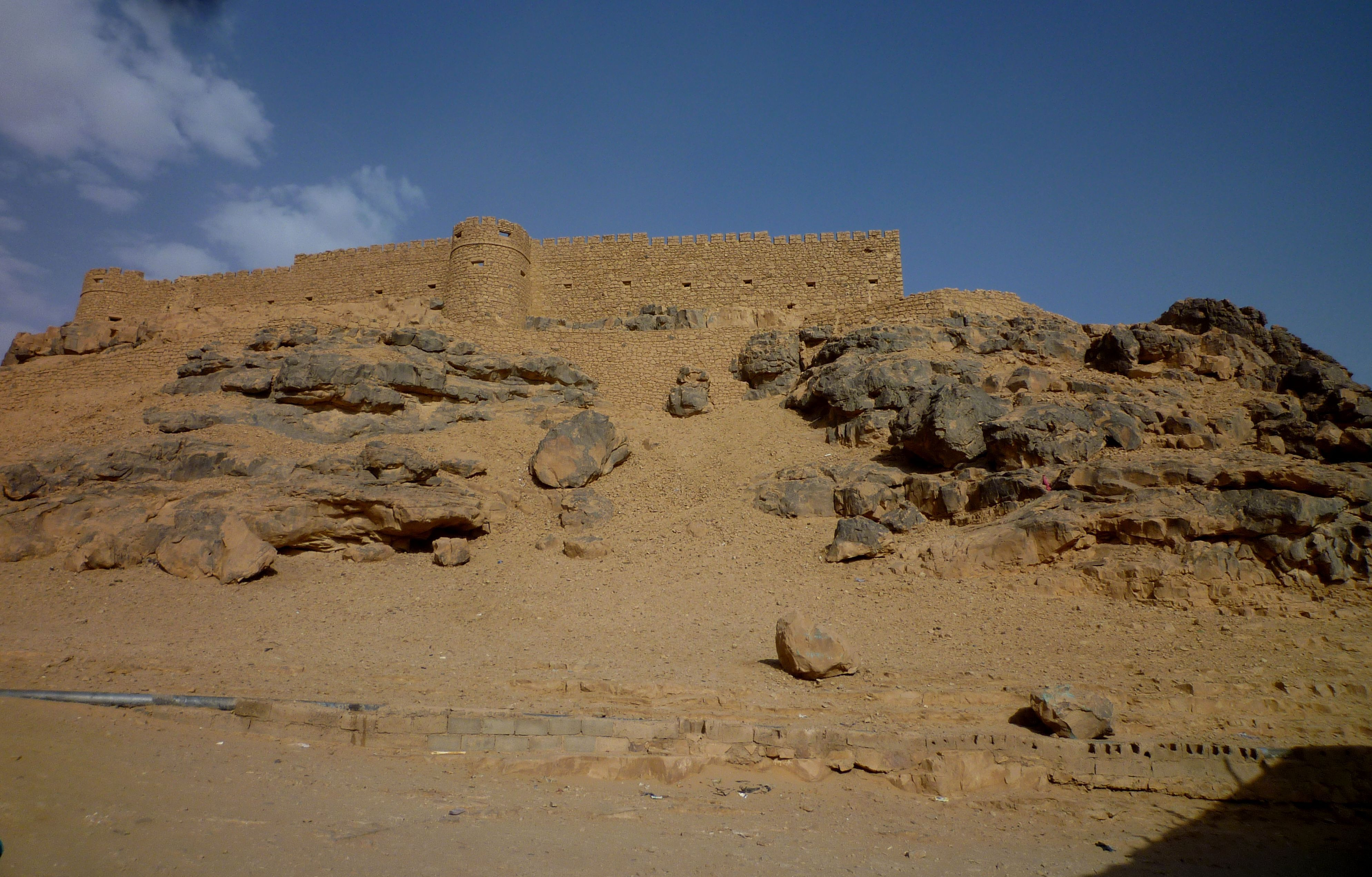
Fortress of Koukemen, built in the early 20th century

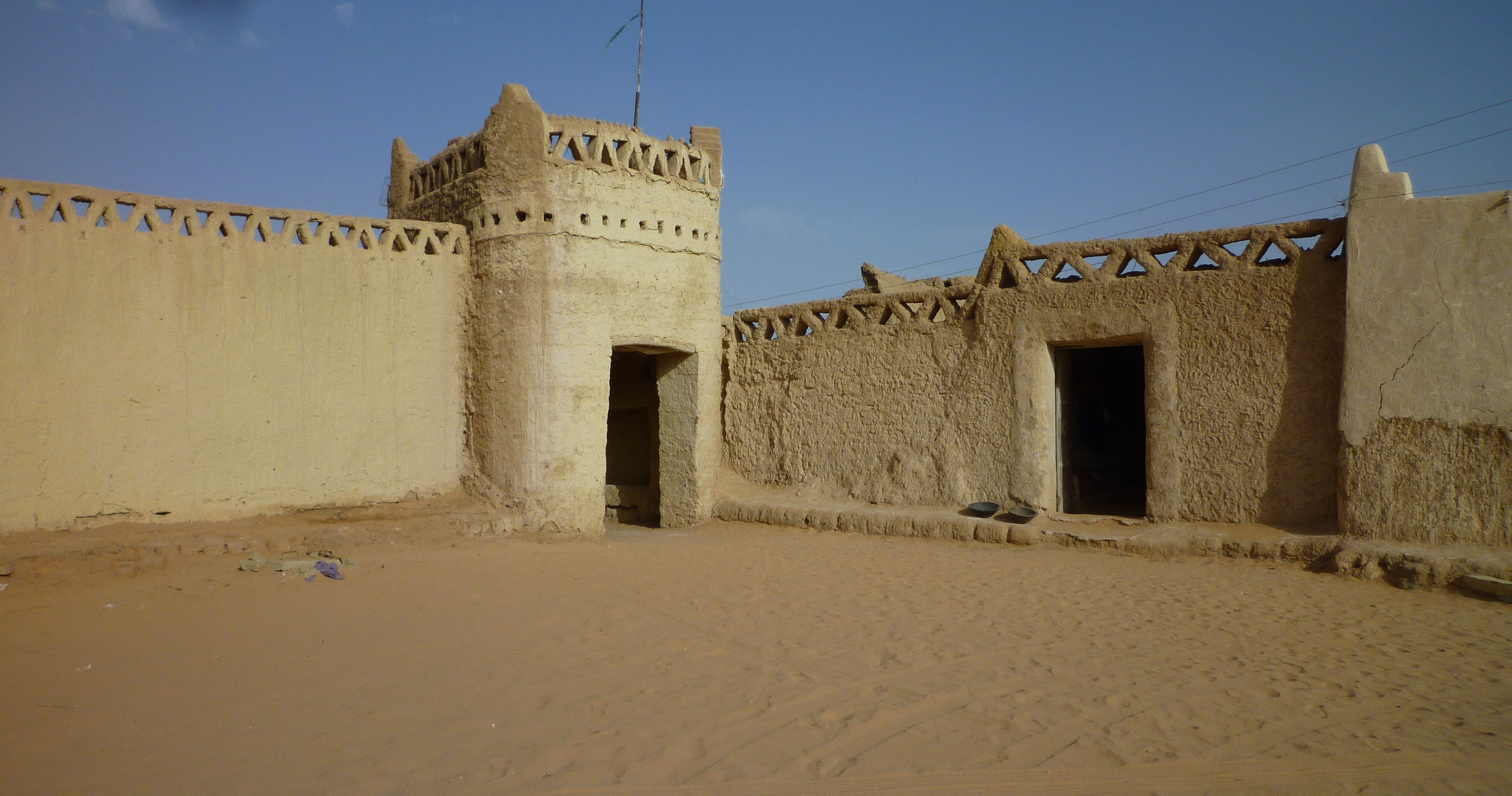
Old town of the caravan base, forecourt and city gate

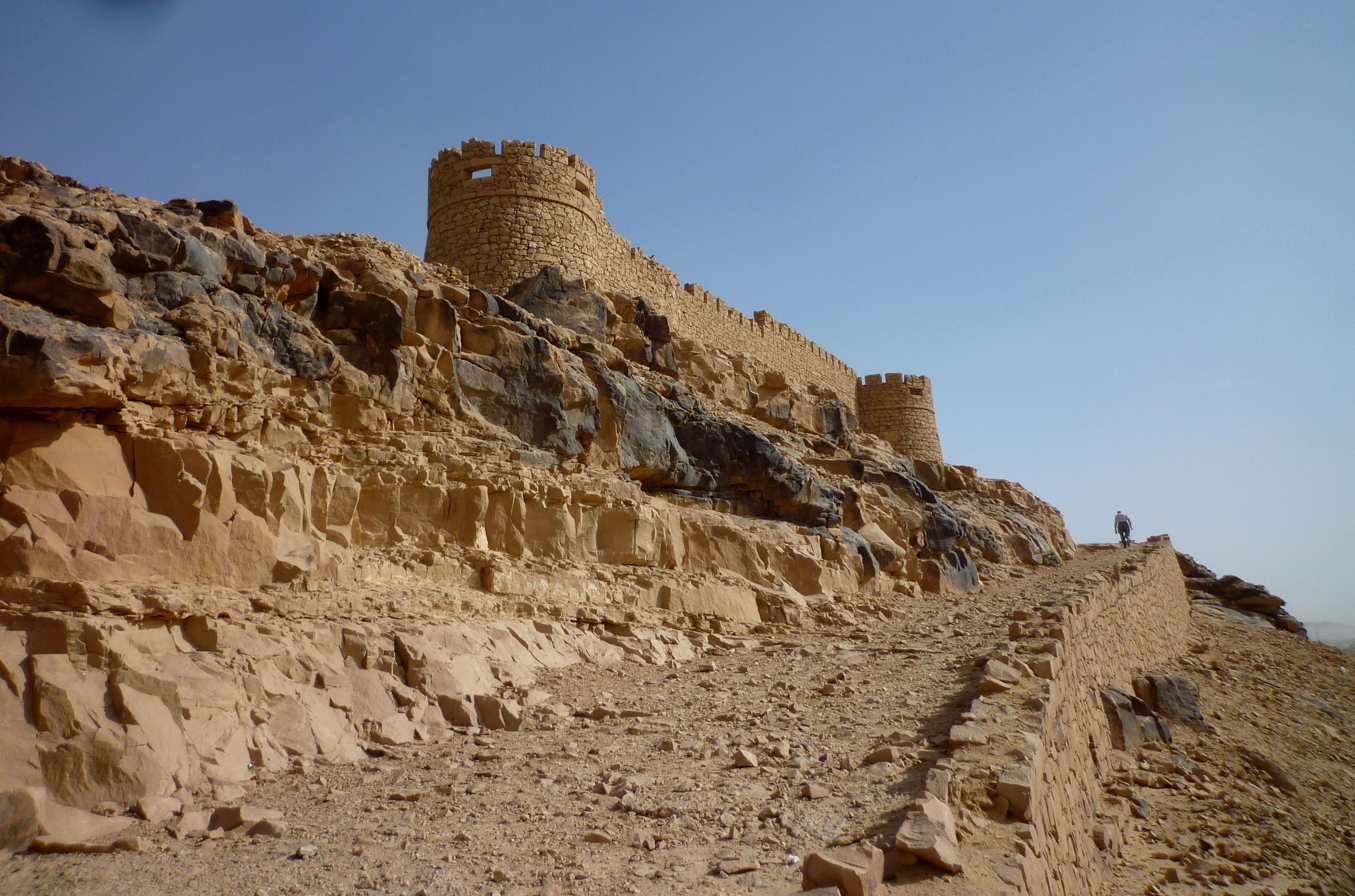
Fortress of Koukemen

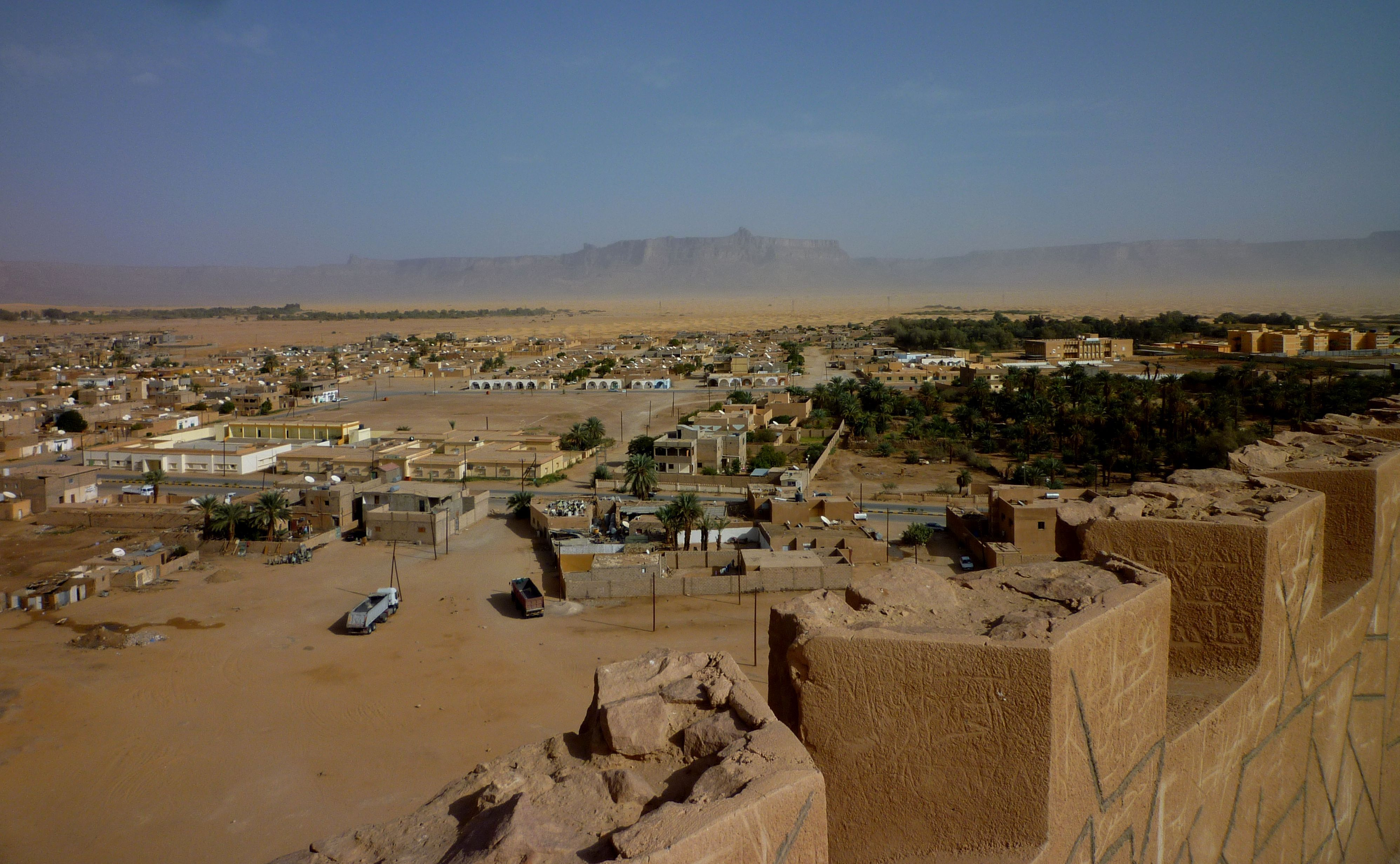
View from the fortress
