= 2011 Sabha clashes =

- Part of the First Libyan Civil War
Date	8–13 June 2011 (5 days)
Location	Sabha, Libya
Result	Libyan government victory
Territorial changes	Libyan government forces retain control of the town

Belligerents
(Libya) Libyan Opposition; Fighters from the Awlad Suleiman tribe	(Libya) Libyan Government; Libyan Armed Forces; Paramilitary forces

Commanders and leaders
Unknown	Unknown

Casualties and losses
At least 1 killed	Unknown

The 2011 Sabha clashes were a series of clashes between forces loyal to Libyan leader Muammar Gaddafi and rebel anti-Gaddafi forces for control of the desert oasis city of Sabha

The clashes were part of the Libyan Civil War and took place during June 2011.

== Background ==
Sabha is a city of around 210,000 people located by an oasis in the Libyan Desert and is home to an important military base. Much of its population are migrants from Chad, Niger, and Sudan. These migrants had been brought to Libya by Gaddafi in the 1980s and given employment and stipends by the regime to ensure their support. In addition, the city is home to a large number of members of the Qadhadhfa tribe, to which Gaddafi belongs. As a result, the city was regarded as a stronghold of pro-Gaddafi sentiment as the anti-regime protests that began across Libya in February 2011 turned into civil war. As the conflict progressed, however, many of the migrants went north to fight against the rebels, draining Gaddafi's major base of support in the city. Those who remained behind were mostly armed young locals and members of the Awlad Suleiman tribe. The Awlad Suleiman bear strong resentment against the regime. Shortly after Gaddafi seized power, members of the tribe were accused of plotting to overthrow him. Many tribesmen were executed and imprisoned as a result.

== June clashes ==
After remaining relatively quiet for much of the conflict, anti-government protests broke out in the city in early June. On 8 June, government troops fired into the air to disperse a crowd of protesters, igniting a violent clash between the groups. Anti-Gaddafi Awlad Suleiman tribesmen "liberated several streets" in the city by 11 June, according to the rebel National Transitional Council. Rebels set up checkpoints in the main residential district of Souk al-Namla. Reports indicated that these rebels were armed, partially by weapons from rebels in the north. By 12 June, the city's residents stated that they feared pro-Gaddafi forces and mercenaries from the north were readying to return to Sabha to subdue the opposition elements.

== July pro-Gaddafi rally ==
On 8 July, Gaddafi spoke to a crowd of 50,000 people at a pro-Gaddafi rally. During his speech, he threatened to attack Europe.

=== August/September ===
On 23 August, more clashes broke out in Sabha. Col Bani called Sabha "the last stronghold for (Gaddafi)." Sabha came under anti-Gaddafi control in late September.
