= Murzuq District =

District of Libya

Coordinates: 25°54′N 13°54′E

Murzuq مرزق
- District
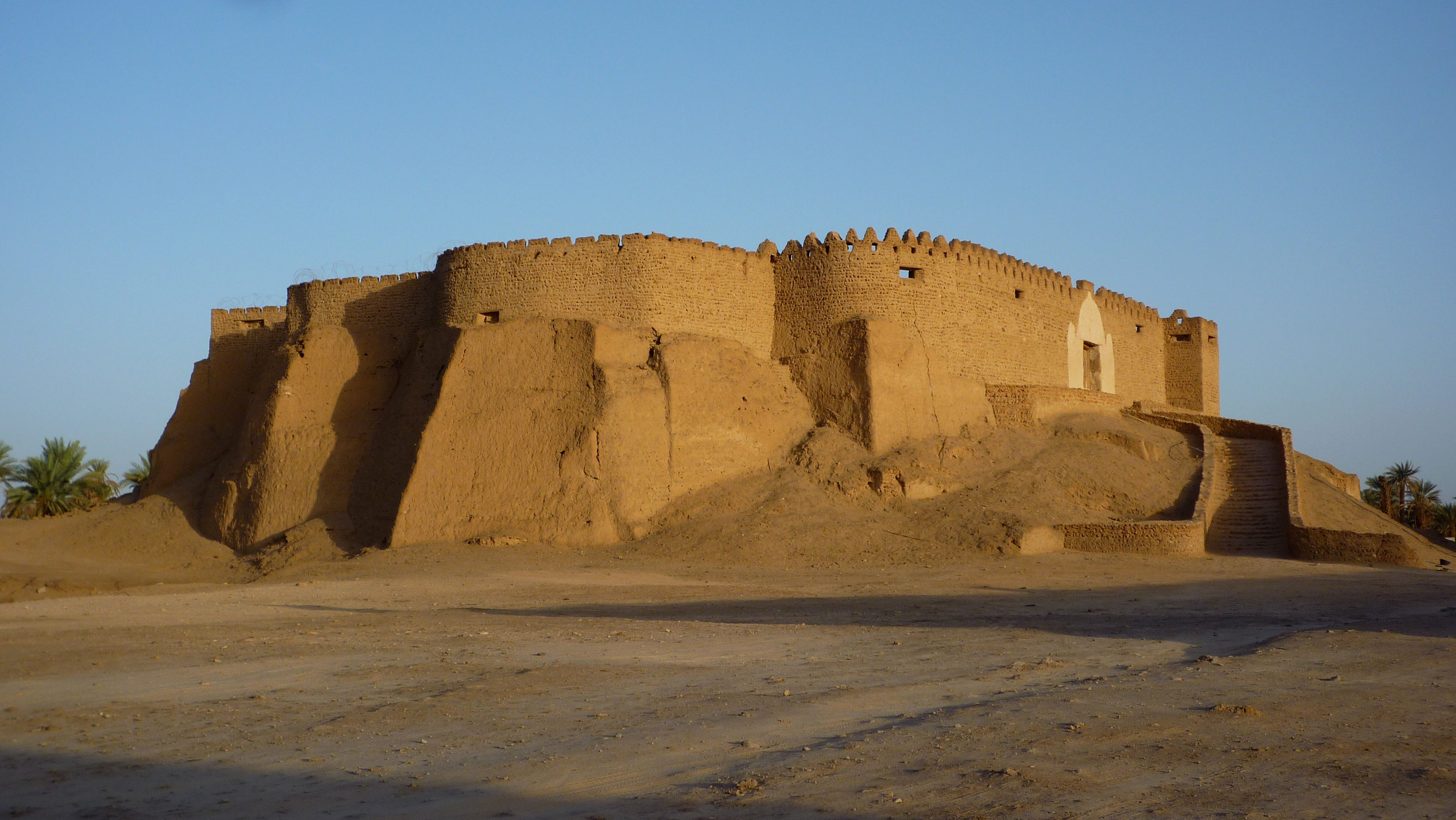

- Map of Libya with Murzuq district highlighted
- Country: Libya
- Capital: Murzuk

Area
  - Total: 349,790 km^{2} (135,050 sq mi)

Population (2006)
  - Total: 78,621
  - Density: 0.22477/km^{2} (0.58214/sq mi)
- License Plate Code: 15, 62

Murzuq (Arabic: مرزق Murzuq) is a districts of Libya in the south of the country. Its capital is Murzuk. The city was occupied by the Ottoman Empire in 1578 and served as the capital of Fezzan off and on until the Ottomans ceded Libya to Italy in 1912. It was not occupied by the Italians until 1914.

To the southeast, Murzuq borders the Bourkou-Ennedi-Tibesti Region of Chad, and to the southwest it borders the Agadez Department of Niger. The border crossing to Niger is at Tumu. Domestically, it borders Ghat in the west, Wadi al Hayaa in northwest, west of Sabha, Sabha in northwest, east of Wadi Al Hayaa, Jufra in north and Kufra in the east.

Per the census of 2012, the total population in the region was 157,747 with 150,353 Libyans. The average size of the household in the country was 6.9, while the average household size of non-Libyans was 3.7. There were totally 22,713 households in the district, with 20,907 Libyan ones. The population density of the district was 1.86 persons per sq. km. Per 2006 census, there were totally 28,642 economically active people in the district.

== Geography ==
Libya has mostly a flat undulating plain and occasional plateau, with an average elevation of around 423 m (1,388 ft). Around 91 per cent of the land is covered by desert, with only 8.8 per cent agricultural land (with only 1% arable lands) and 0.1 per cent of forests. The major resources are petroleum, gypsum and natural gas. Along the coastal regions, the climate is Mediterranean in coastal areas, while it is desert climate in all other parts. Dust storms lasting four to eight days is pretty common during Spring. Triplotania is the northwest region, while it is Cyrenacia in the east and Fezzen in southwest. Fezzen is mostly full of deserts. The region receives an annual rainfall of 2.5 in (64 mm). There are no perennial rivers in the region, but the region is abundant with groundwater aquifers.

== Demographics ==
Per the census of 2012, the total population in the region was 157,747 with 150,353 Libyans. The average size of the household in the country was 6.9, while the average household size of non-Libyans being 3.7. There were totally 22,713 households in the district, with 20,907 Libyan ones. The population density of the district was 1.86 persons per sq. km. Per 2006 census, there were totally 28,642 economically active people in the district. There were 15,907 government employees, 2,678 employers, 9,613 first level workers and 001 second level workers. There were 6,726 workers in state administration, 3,351 in agriculture, animal husbandry and forestry, 3,789 in agriculture & hunting, 6,607 in education, 2,303 in private enterprises, 2,231 in health & social work, 1,670 in production, 6,554 in technical work and 480 service workers. The total enrollment in schools was 27,761 and the number of people above secondary stage and less than graduation was 1,710. As per the report from World Health Organization (WHO), there were 1 communicable disease centres, 1 dental clinics, 1 general clinics, 0 in-patient clinics, 2 out-patient clinics, 9 pharmacies, 52 PHC centres, 1 polyclinics, 1 rural clinics and 0 specialized clinics. Islam is the state and major religion of the country.

== Local administration ==
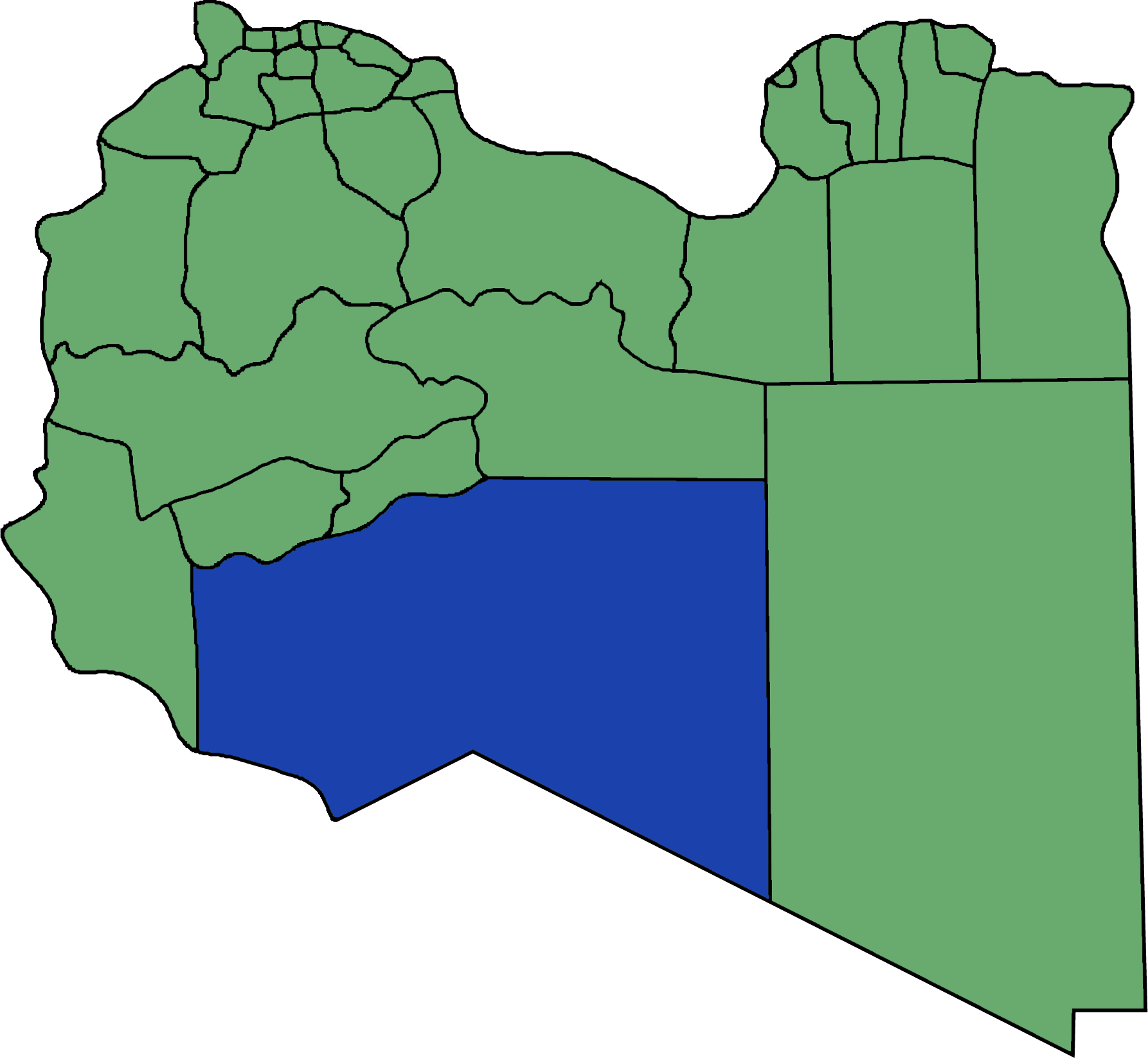
Pre-2007 extent of Murzuq District

The border between Murzuq and Jufra districts was modified after 2007 administrative reorganization of Libyan Districts. Among the towns in Murzuq district are Qatrun, Al `Uwaynat (Sardalis), Al Wigh, Murzuk, Qawat, and Tajarhi. The border settlement of Wath also serves the district. Libya became independent in 1951 from the colonial empire and generally known for its oil rich resources. All the powers rested centrally with the President Gaddafi for 42 years till the 2011 armed rebellion which topple him. As per the constitution, Libya is the most decentralized Arab nation, but practically all powers are vested on central government on account of control over the oil revenues. Local governmental institutions manage the administration of education, industry, and communities. As a part of decentralization in 2012, the country is administratively split into 13 regions from the original 25 municipalities, which were further divided in 1,500 communes. Since 2015, the chief of the state is a Chairman of Presidential Council, while the Prime Minister is the head of the state. The House of Representatives is an elected body that is elected on universal suffrage and popular vote. As of 2016, there were 22 administrative divisions in the country in the form of districts.

== See also ==
- Murzuq Desert
