= Qatrun =

Qatrun القطرون
- Village
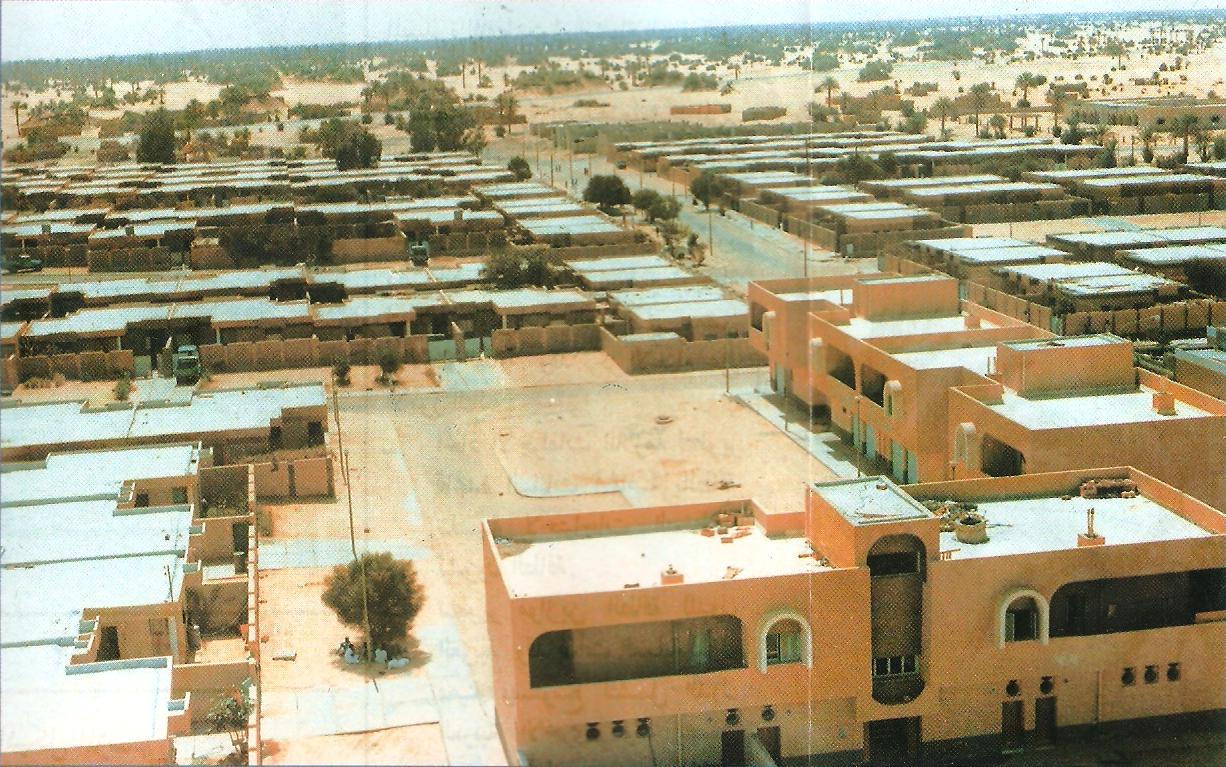
- Qatrun in 1988

- Location in Libya
- Coordinates: 24°55′44″N 14°34′33″E
- Country: Libya
- Region: Fezzan
- District: Murzuq

Population (2009)
  - Total: 4,501
- Time zone: UTC+2 (EET)
- License Plate Code: 62

Qatrun, Al Katrun, Gatrone, or Al Gatrun (Arabic: القطرون) is a village in the Murzuq District in southern Libya on the main road to Chad and Niger. Niger maintains a consulate office there. When the border checkpoint 310 kilometres south at Tumu is closed, travelers crossing into Libya from Niger report in at Qatrun.

The town was briefly captured by the National Liberation Army during the Libyan Civil War in July 2011. On 23 July, Gaddafi forces recaptured the city and continued south towards Al Wigh. The National Liberation Army later recaptured the village.
