= Al Wigh =

Al Wigh ألويغ Al Wyg
- Location in Libya
- Coordinates: 24°14′42.31″N 14°33′57.95″E
- Country: Libya
- Region: Fezzan
- District: Murzuq
- Elevation: 1,558 ft (475 m)

Population (2009)
  - Total: 300
- Time zone: UTC+2 (EET)

Al Wigh is a small desert oasis airfield located in the Sahara Desert, army outpost and military base in the Fezzan region of southwest Libya. It is about 975 kilometres south of the country's capital, Tripoli, and about 500 kilometres from the Niger-Chad border.

The base was the site of several small confrontations in the Southern Libyan Desert campaign in the 2011 Libyan civil war between rebel anti-Gaddafi forces (mainly Toubou tribesmen) and loyalist pro-Gaddafi forces.
