= Abu Qurayn =

Abu Qurayn أبو قرين
- Village
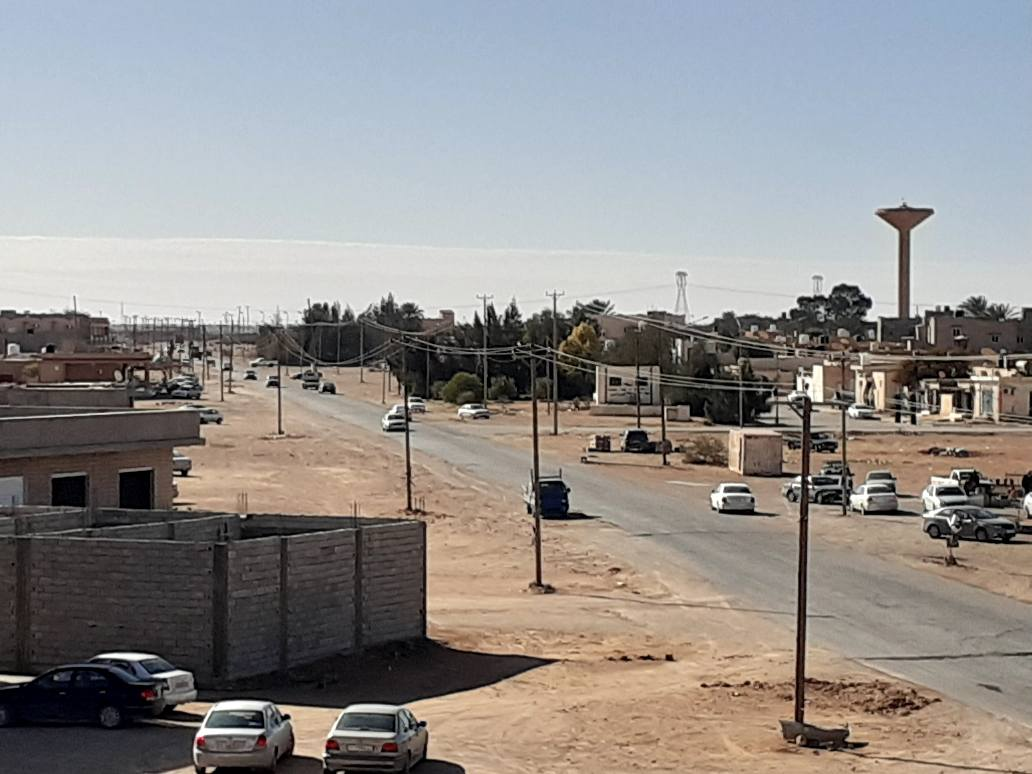

- Location in Libya
- Coordinates: 31°27′04″N 15°14′56″E
- Country: Libya
- Region: Tripolitania
- District: Sirte
- Time zone: UTC+2 (EET)

Abu Qurayn or Abu Grein /ˌɑːbuː ˈɡreɪn/ (Arabic: أبو قرين ʾAbū Qurayn), also known as El Hisha El Jadida (Arabic: الهيشة الجديدة Al-Hīšaẗ al-Jadīdah), is a village in Libya. It is located 118 km south of Misrata, and 138 km west of Sirte. It is on the cross-roads between the Libyan Coastal Highway and the Fezzan road.
