= Fezzan Road =

Road in Libya

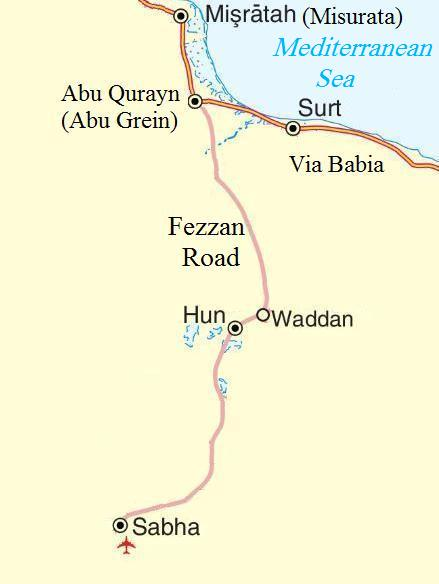

Location
- Country: Libya

Highway system
- Transport in Libya

Fezzan Road is an asphalt road in central Libya, running from Abu Qurayn near the coast to Sabha in the Sahara Desert. It is 620 km (385 mi) long.

== History ==
Fezzan Road was constructed in the early 1960s. It was the largest road project in Libya since the Italian colonial Libyan Coastal Highway. It was probably the most important transportation project in Libya prior to the petroleum era.

The importance of Fezzan Road was reduced after paving the Mizda–Brak Road in the 1980s. It reduced the full Tripoli-Sabha route length from 933 km (580 mi) to 780 km (485 mi).
