= OTRAG =

West German rocket company

- Function: Launch vehicle
- Manufacturer: OTRAG
- Country of origin: West Germany

Launch history
- Status: Retired
- Launch sites: Shaba North, Congo; Sabha, Libya; Esrange, Sweden
- Total launches: 18
- First flight: 18 May 1977
- Last flight: 19 September 1983

Common Rocket Propulsion Unit
- Height: 16 m (52 ft)
- Diameter: 0.27 m (11 in)
- Empty mass: 150 kg (330 lb)
- Gross mass: 1,500 kg (3,300 lb)
- Powered by: 1 × OTRAG
- Maximum thrust: 26.960 kN (6,061 lb_{f})
- Specific impulse: 297 s (2.91 km/s)
- Burn time: 140 seconds
- Propellant: N_{2}O_{4}

The OTRAG rocket was a West German modular satellite-delivery rocket developed by the OTRAG company (German: Orbital Transport- und Raketen-Aktiengesellschaft, or Orbital Transport and Rockets, Inc.) in the 1970s and 80s. The OTRAG rocket was to become a rocket built up from several mass-produced units, intended to carry satellites with a weight of 1-10 tons or more into orbit. Mass production meant that the vehicle was projected to have been 10x cheaper than conventional vehicles of similar capability.

OTRAG was based in Stuttgart, and in the late 1970s and early 1980s planned to develop an alternative propulsion system for rockets. OTRAG was the first commercial developer and producer of space launch vehicles. The rocket was claimed to be an inexpensive alternative to existing launch systems through mass-production of Common Rocket Propulsion Units (CRPU).

== Rocket design ==
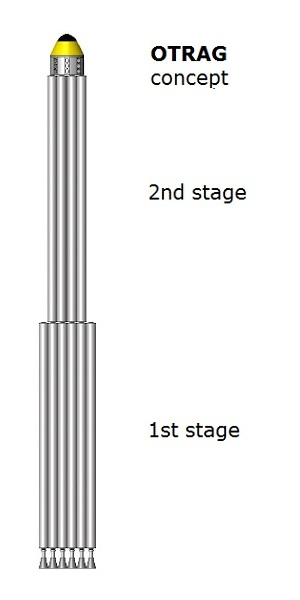
OTRAG concept

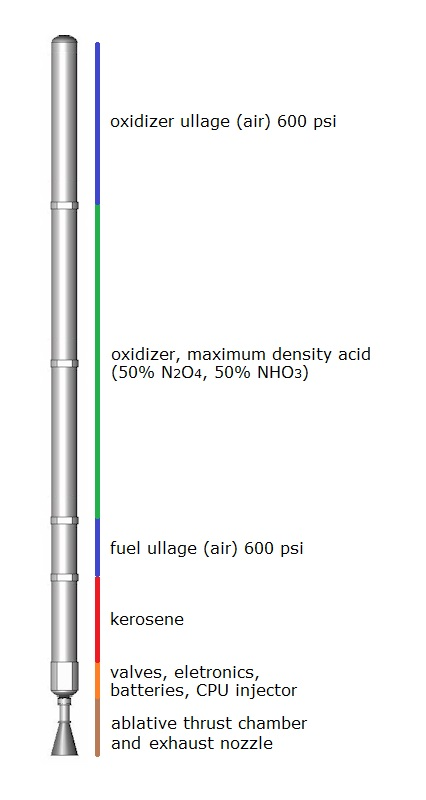
OTRAG CRPU

OTRAG was a design quite different from conventional multistage rockets. The OTRAG design used parallel stages assembled from parallel tank tubes with flat bulkheads. The rockets were designed to carry loads up to two tons, the then usual weight of a communications satellite, into a geostationary orbit. It was planned to later increase the capacity to ten tons or more using multiple identical modules.

The rocket was to consist of individual pipes, each 27 cm in diameter and six meters long. Four of these pipes would be installed one above the other resulting in a 24 meter long fuel and oxidizer tank with a rocket engine at the lower end making up a CRPU. The fuel was intended to be kerosene with a 50/50 mixture of nitric acid and dinitrogen tetroxide as an oxidiser. Ignition was provided by a small quantity of furfuryl alcohol injected before the fuel, which ignites hypergolically (immediately and energetically) upon contact with the nitric acid. To simplify the design, pumps were not used to move the fuel to the engines, instead the fuel tanks were only 66% filled, with compressed air in the remaining space to press propellants into the ablatively cooled combustion chamber. Thrust control is by partially closing the electromechanical propellant valves. Pitch and yaw control can thus be achieved by differential throttling. In principle this is extremely reliable and cheap in mass production.

The modular design was intended to result in a large cost reduction due to economies of scale. The CRPU-based satellite launching rocket was estimated to cost approximately one tenth of conventional designs. Automated production processes for all components would reduce labor cost from 80% to 20% and remove the justification for reusability of spent stages.

One large 4 stage configuration OTRAG 10K was supposed to launch a payload of 10,000 kg to a 185 km Orbit. The planned liftoff thrust was around 26 MN with a total mass of 2,300 tonnes:

- stage 1 : 456 CRPU
- stage 2 : 114 CRPU
- stage 3 : 48 CRPU
- stage 4 : 7 CRPU

== Flight history ==
The engines were tested extensively on ground rigs, on both German and African test sites. Experiments were run with varying fuel and oxidiser formulations, as the general design was quite robust.

Small, 4-unit vehicles were built and tested several sites: Shaba North in modern Democratic Republic of the Congo and Seba Oasis, Libya. The rockets used were 6 and 12 meters long, and obtained heights of 20 to 50 kilometres. The basic CRPU concept was shown to be workable, though some rockets experienced guidance or component failures. The last launch of an OTRAG rocket took place on September 19, 1983, at Esrange. Following this launch, the OTRAG rocket was to be used in high altitude research.

After the company had left Libya in 1987, some remaining equipment was confiscated by the government. However, enough parts and knowledge were missing to prevent Libya from continuing the project.

OTRAG rocket launches
Date	OTRAG variant	Apogee (km)	Launch site	Details
1977 May 18	4x9m	15	Shaba North	Four-module test vehicle, 6 m long; propulsion test
1978 May 19	4x9m	30	Shaba North	Four-module test vehicle, 6 m long; high altitude night test
1978 Jun 5	4x15m	0	Shaba North	Lost control and crashed after seconds
1981 Mar 1	4x15m	150?	Sabha, Libya	300 km apogee according to astronautix; failure according to Leitenberger
1981 Jun 7	4x15m	50?	Sabha, Libya	High acceleration test, 20 % propellant load
1981 Sep 17	1x15m	50?	Sabha, Libya	Engine induced roll test
1981 Oct 1	1x15m	50?	Sabha, Libya	Burn to depletion test
1981 Oct 24	1x15m	50?	Sabha, Libya	Oxidizer depletion test
1981 Nov 19	1x15m	50?	Sabha, Libya	Fuel depletion test
1981 Dec 12	1x15m	50?	Sabha, Libya	Onboard TV camera test
1982 Jun 2	1x15m	50?	Sabha, Libya	Deep throttling test
1982 Jun 24	1x15m	10?	Sabha, Libya	Early cut-off and destruct test
1982 Sep 2	1x15m	50?	Sabha, Libya	Roll control test
1982 Sep 11	1x15m	50?	Sabha, Libya	Stage separation simulation
1982 Nov 10	1x15m	50?	Sabha, Libya	60 degree elevation launch
1982 Nov 16	1x15m	50?	Sabha, Libya	RFNA oxidizer test
1982 Dec 9	1x15m	50?	Sabha, Libya	JP-4 fuel test
1983 Sep 19	4x9m	4	ESRANGE	

== Corporate history ==
OTRAG
- Industry: Alternative propulsion system for rockets
- Founded: 1974 in Neu-Isenburg, West Germany
- Founder: Lutz Kayser
- Defunct: 1987
- Fate: Nationalized by Libya
- Headquarters: Stuttgart, West Germany
- Area served: West Germany, Zaire, Libya
- Key people: Lutz Kayser; Kurt H. Debus; Frank Wukasch; Wolfgang Pilz; Wernher von Braun

OTRAG was founded on October 17, 1974 by German aerospace engineer Lutz Kayser. OTRAG's goal was to develop, produce, and operate a low-cost satellite launch vehicle. It was the first private company to attempt to launch a private spacecraft. The OTRAG rocket was intended to be an inexpensive alternative to the European rocket Ariane and the NASA Space Shuttle. Kayser and a private consortium of six hundred European investors financed the development and production of the OTRAG satellite launch vehicle. Dr. Kurt H. Debus served as Chairman of the Board of OTRAG (1974–1980) after his retirement as director of NASA's Kennedy Space Center, and Dr. Wernher von Braun served as scientific adviser to Kayser.

In the face of doubts by Debus and von Braun, Kayser chose in 1975 to set up testing and launch facilities in Shaba, Zaire (now Katanga Province, Democratic Republic of the Congo). Debus and von Braun were concerned about the possibility of Zairian acquisition of missile technology from the facilities. Kayser decided to proceed despite their opposition.

Otrag's first test was on May 17, 1977, with the second successful launch on May 20, 1978. The third test, 16 days later, failed on June 5, 1978, with Zairian President Mobutu Sese Seko watching the launch.

Political pressure to halt the company's operations mounted quickly. France and the Soviet Union were historically opposed to German long-distance rocket development and pressured the Zairian government into closing down the development facility in 1979. Immediately afterwards, Presidents Giscard d'Estaing of France and Leonid Brezhnev of the Soviet Union convinced the West German government to cancel the OTRAG project and close down its German operations. In 1980, OTRAG moved its production and testing facilities to a desert site in Libya. A series of successful tests was conducted at this site beginning in 1981.

OTRAG shut down in 1987. As the company left Libya, Muammar Gaddafi confiscated all equipment and installations, hoping to later use the technology, and German investors lost their money.

== Controversies and future outlook ==
Only a few political controversies are known concerning OTRAG, which involve the concerns of neighbors in Zaire and Libya about the dual use potential of rockets. A full orbital launch vehicle was never assembled. Modules were flight tested in Zaire and Libya. 6,000 static rocket engine tests and 16 single-stage qualification tests were made to prove the concept as feasible.

Hans Dietrich Genscher, the then-minister of German foreign affairs, is said to have finally stopped the project under pressure from France and the Soviet Union, and West Germany joined the co-financed "European rocket" Ariane project, which made the OTRAG project unnecessary and eliminated political entanglements of a still divided Germany in the early 1980s.

Around 2009, Lutz Kayser had been advising Interorbital Systems, resulting in a similar modular rocket design for their Neptune series.

== Resurgence of interest ==
John Carmack, CEO of Armadillo Aerospace met with Lutz Kayser, the founding engineer of OTRAG, in May, 2006 who loaned Carmack some of their original research hardware.

"I have been corresponding with Lutz for a few months now, and I have learned quite a few things. I seriously considered an OTRAG style massive-cluster-of-cheap-modules orbital design back when we had 98% peroxide (assumed to be a biprop with kerosene), and I have always considered it one of the viable routes to significant reduction in orbital launch costs. After really going over the trades and details with Lutz, I am quite convinced that this is the lowest development cost route to significant orbital capability. Eventually, reusable stages will take over, but I actually think that we can make it all the way to orbit on our current budget by following this path. The individual modules are less complicated than our current vehicles, and I am becoming more and more fond of high production methods over hand crafter prototypes." -- June 2006 Armadillo Aerospace Update

ARCA Space Corporation have also been inspired by the OTRAG rocket for the design of the EcoRocket Heavy. Interorbital Systems also uses a similar configuration in some variants of their NEPTUNE rocket.

== See also ==
- Pressure-fed engine (rocket)
- ARCAspace
- Shaba North
