= Sabha Airbase =

Airport in Libya

Sabha Airbase
- IATA: none; ICAO: none

Summary
- Airport type: Military
- Owner: Libyan National Army
- Operator: Libyan Air Force
- Location: Sabha, Libya
- Occupants: 1 Sqn; 1025 Sqn
- Elevation AMSL: 1,414 ft / 431 m
- Coordinates: 26°59′45″N 014°28′09″E

Map
- Location in Libya

Runways
Direction	Length		Surface
Direction	ft	m	Surface
13/31	11,758	3,583	Asphalt
06/24	4,455	1,357	Asphalt

Sabha Airbase (also called Tamanhent Airbase) is a Libyan Air Force base southeast of Sabha, Libya.

The airport shares its runway with Sabha Airport.

== History ==
The airbase used to support the Tupolev Tu-22 bomber, these have been non-operational since at least 1992.

== Current use ==
=== Military ===
The base is home to the 1st and 1025th Squadrons of Mikoyan-Gurevich MiG-25 fighter aircraft.

It was bombed by coalition aircraft during the 2011 Libyan civil war.

==== Expansion ====
Google Earth shows the construction of 36 aircraft revetments in the South East corner.

MiG-25 fighter jets are seen on the large rectangular tarmac in the south-west quadrant of the base.

=== Civilian ===
Libyan Airlines currently serves the airport.
