= Ghat, Libya =

Ghat غات
- Town
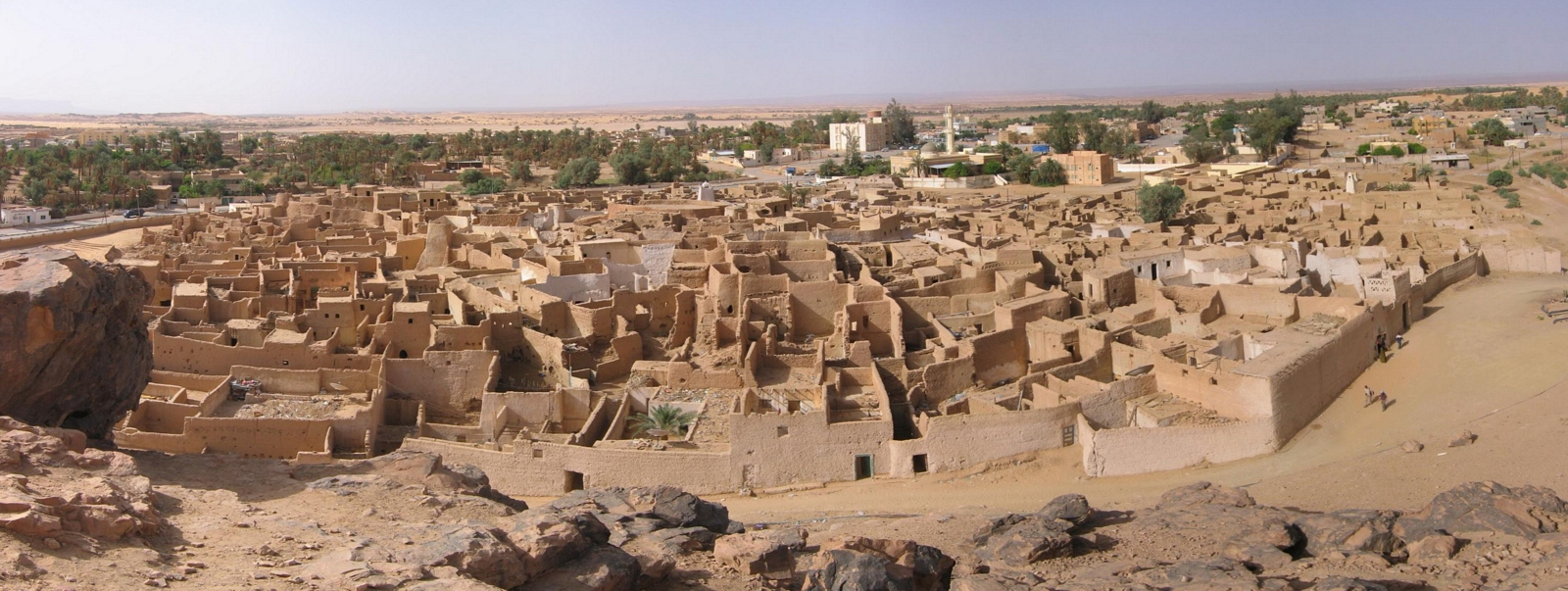
- Interactive map of Ghat
- Location in Libya
- Coordinates: 24°57′34″N 10°10′33″E
- Country: Libya
- Region: Fezzan
- District: Ghat
- Elevation: 2,192 ft (668 m)

Population (2017)
  - Total: 15,000
- Time zone: UTC+02:00 (EET)
- License Plate Code: 32

Ghat (Arabic: غات) is the capital of the Ghat District in the Fezzan region of southwestern Libya, located just east of the Algerian border.

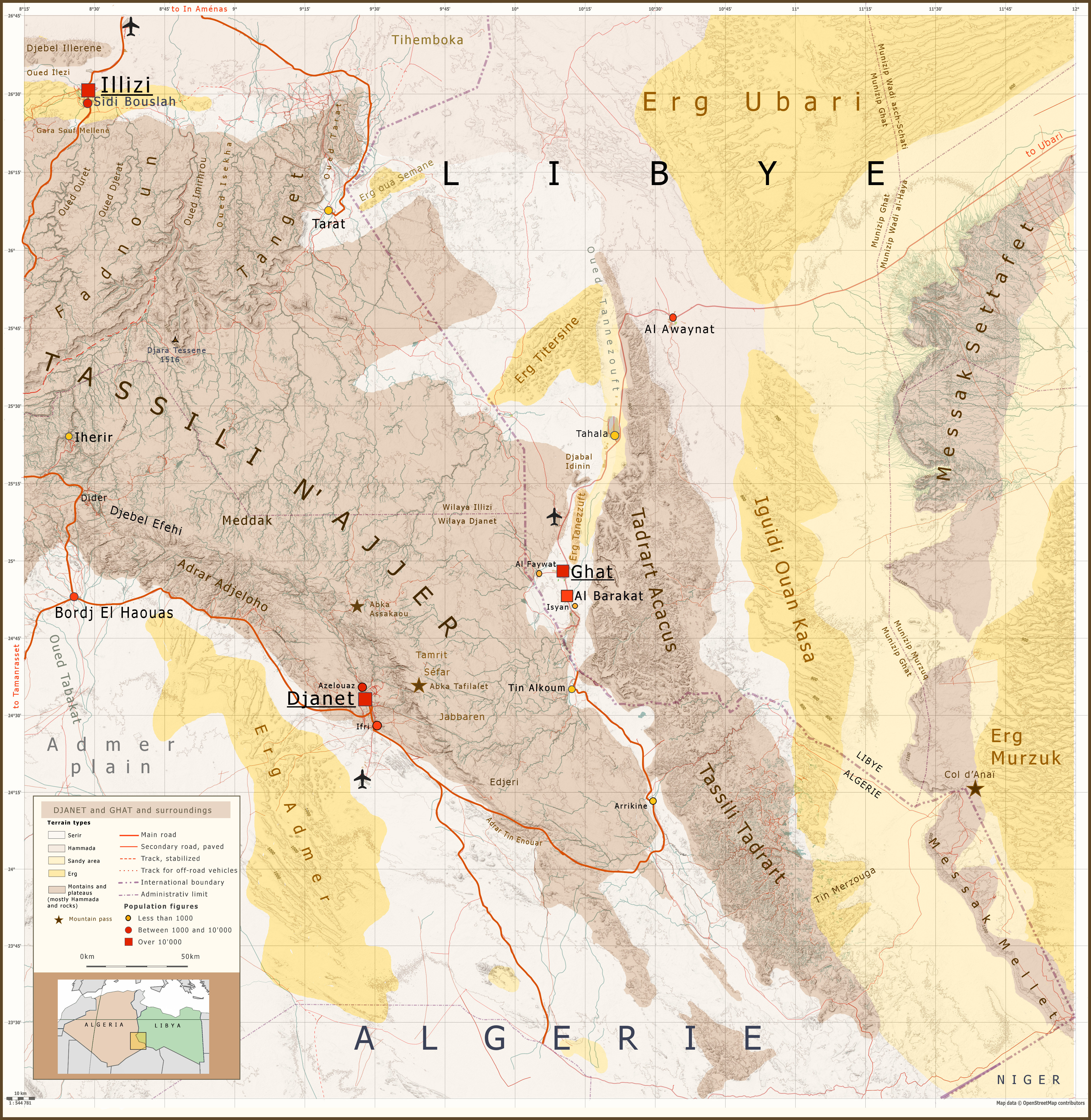
Topographic map of the Algerian-Libyan border with Ghat in the center

== History ==
In historical times, Ghat was an important terminal point on a trans-Saharan trade route and a major administrative center in the Fezzan. It was a stronghold for the Kel Ajjer Tuareg federation whose territory covered most of south-western Libya—including Ubari, Sabha and Ghadames, plus south-eastern Algeria (Djanet and Illizi).

From the 5th century BC to the 5th century AD, the Fezzan was home to the Garamantian Empire, a city state which operated the Trans-Saharan trade routes between the Carthaginians—and later the Roman Empire—and the Sahelian states of West and Central Africa. During the 13th and 14th centuries, portions of the Fezzan were part of the Kanem Empire, while the Ottoman rulers of North Africa asserted their control over the region in the 17th century. Ghat and its inhabitants were described in great detail by the English traveller James Richardson in his journeys across the Libyan Sahara of 1845–1846.

Beginning in 1911, Ghat and the Fezzan were occupied by Italy. Berber and Arab adherents to a militant Sufi religious order, the Sanusiya, resisted early Italian attempts at conquest, and Italy's control of the region was precarious until at least 1923, with the rise of the Italian Fascist regime. To defend their positions, the Italians built the Fortress of Ghat that dominates the city from the hill of Koukemen. This fort is still standing, and is a tourist attraction of the city.

During the Second World War, Ghat was occupied by France from 1943. On 21 November 1949, the United Nations General Assembly passed a resolution stating that Libya should become independent before 1 January 1952. Fezzan Province was then absorbed within the borders of the Kingdom of Libya.

== Climate ==
Ghat has a hot desert climate (Köppen climate classification BWh) typical of the Fezzan, a Libyan region lying in the heart of the Sahara Desert. Averages high temperatures exceed 40 °C (104 °F) during summer for 3 months (June, July, August) and averages high temperatures remain above 20 °C (68 °F) during the coldest month of the year. Winter days are very warm, sunny and dry. Annual precipitation averages only 8 mm (0.32 in) making the location one of the driest places on Earth. The sky is always clear and bright throughout the year. Nevertheless, in June 2019 there were heavy downpours which caused great damage to the town. Thousands of residents were stranded and few were reported dead or missing.

Climate data for Ghat (1991–2020)
Month	Jan	Feb	Mar	Apr	May	Jun	Jul	Aug	Sep	Oct	Nov	Dec	Year
Record high °C (°F)	34.3 (93.7)	38.0 (100.4)	39.0 (102.2)	43.0 (109.4)	44.5 (112.1)	46.0 (114.8)	46.0 (114.8)	44.5 (112.1)	44.0 (111.2)	41.8 (107.2)	37.0 (98.6)	34.5 (94.1)	46.0 (114.8)
Mean daily maximum °C (°F)	20.5 (68.9)	23.6 (74.5)	28.6 (83.5)	33.5 (92.3)	37.6 (99.7)	40.2 (104.4)	40.4 (104.7)	39.9 (103.8)	38.2 (100.8)	33.8 (92.8)	27.5 (81.5)	22.3 (72.1)	32.2 (90.0)
Daily mean °C (°F)	12.6 (54.7)	15.5 (59.9)	20.6 (69.1)	25.9 (78.6)	30.3 (86.5)	33.2 (91.8)	33.3 (91.9)	33.0 (91.4)	31.3 (88.3)	26.6 (79.9)	19.8 (67.6)	14.6 (58.3)	24.7 (76.5)
Mean daily minimum °C (°F)	4.8 (40.6)	7.4 (45.3)	12.6 (54.7)	18.3 (64.9)	23.1 (73.6)	26.2 (79.2)	26.2 (79.2)	26.1 (79.0)	24.3 (75.7)	19.3 (66.7)	12.1 (53.8)	6.9 (44.4)	17.3 (63.1)
Record low °C (°F)	−3.0 (26.6)	−4.5 (23.9)	−1.0 (30.2)	7.5 (45.5)	8.3 (46.9)	1.6 (34.9)	19.0 (66.2)	18.5 (65.3)	16.2 (61.2)	4.5 (40.1)	0.5 (32.9)	−3.0 (26.6)	−4.5 (23.9)
Average precipitation mm (inches)	1.5 (0.06)	0.3 (0.01)	1.5 (0.06)	0.8 (0.03)	0.7 (0.03)	0.6 (0.02)	0.0 (0.0)	1.4 (0.06)	0.3 (0.01)	2.5 (0.10)	0.4 (0.02)	0.7 (0.03)	10.7 (0.42)
Average precipitation days (≥ 1.0 mm)	0.2	0.1	0.2	0.2	0.2	0.2	0.0	0.3	0.1	0.3	0.1	0.2	2.1
Source: NOAA

== Present day ==
In the 2000s Ghat, as a garrison town, was the site of shootouts between Libyan security forces and al-Qaeda-linked fighters. The Fezzan campaign and border proximity were the regional components that included Ghat in the Libyan Civil War. On September 25, 2011, fighting moved onto Ghat where the last remnants of pro-Gaddafi loyalists in Fezzan were claimed to be stationed. NTC forces moved in, and took control of Ghat airport, located north of the city. By the next day, the NTC had control of the city itself and Tinkarine border crossing with Algeria. As of early 2019, the city is controlled by the Libyan National Army.

=== Tourism ===
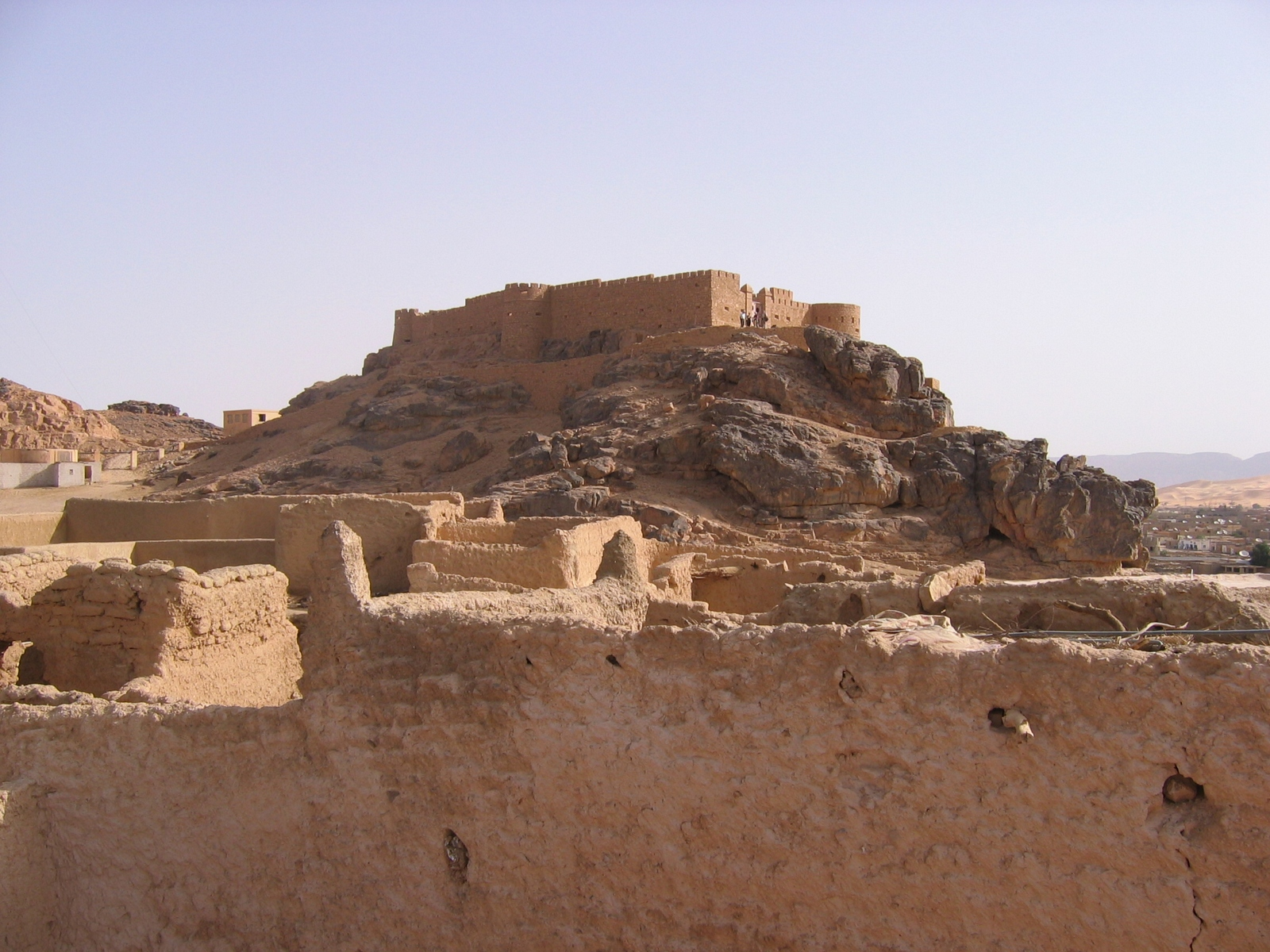
The Fortress of Ghat

Ghat is an important tourist destination due to the existence of prehistoric rock paintings and engravings in the neighboring Tadrart Acacus and Tassili N'Ajjer mountains, in addition to the beauty of the surrounding desert landscapes. A major tourist attraction in the town itself is the Fortress of Ghat on Koukemen hill.

Ghat Airport is the local airport in Ghat.

== See also ==
- Berber
- Tuareg
- Green Sahara
- Fortress of Ghat
- List of cities in Libya
