= Hun, Libya =

Houn هون Hon
- Town
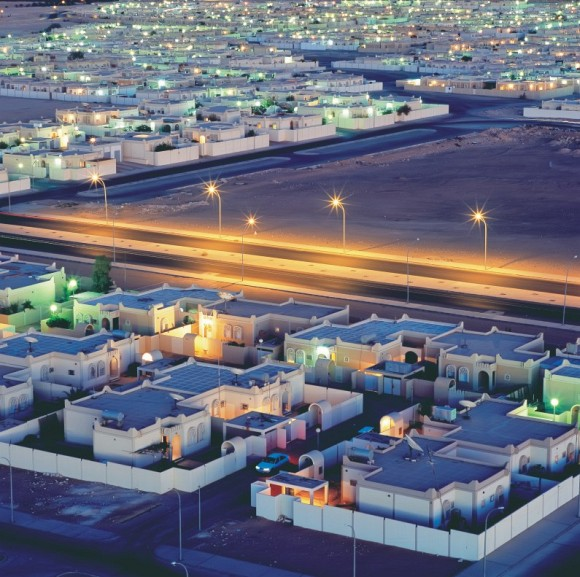
- A view from modern Hun, Libya

- Location in Libya
- Coordinates: 29°07′16″N 15°56′25″E
- Country: Libya
- Region: Fezzan
- District: Jufra
- Elevation: 850 ft (259 m)

Population (2010)
  - Total: 30,715
- Time zone: UTC+2 (EET)
- License Plate Code: 13

Hun or Houn /ˈhuːn/ (Arabic: هون, romanized: Hūn) (Italian: Hon) is an oasis town in the northern Fezzan region of southwest Libya. The town is the capital of the Jufra District. The "International Autumn Tourism Festival" is an annual festival usually held at the end of September.

== History ==
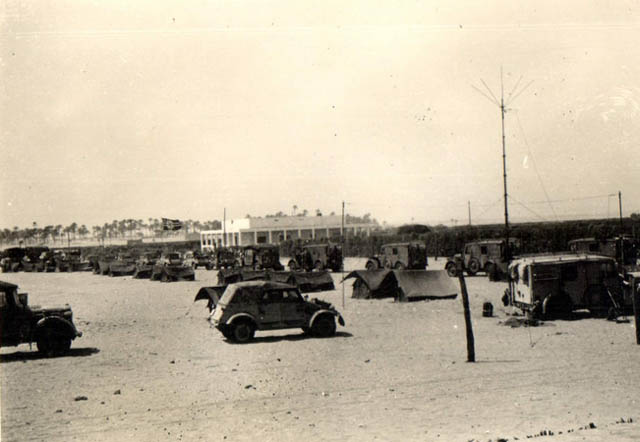
Hun el-Fuara, March 1941, Gruppe Schwerin, German Army

During the colonial Italian Libya period, Hun was the administrative capital of the Italian Fezzan region, called Territorio del Sahara Libico. Hun was the Italian military center of southern Italian Libya, and was not part of the national Fourth Shore territory of the Kingdom of Italy as Italian Tripolitania and Italian Cyrenaica. In the 1939 census Italians were 3% of the total population of 35,316 in the city. They disappeared from Hun after Italy's loss of Libya in World War II. An important Libyan Italian born in Hun was the internationally renowned painter Mario Schifano (1934–1998). In the 1930s the Italian government made some important improvements to the small town, including a connection to the coast via the new Fezzan Road.

During the Libyan Civil War, on 8 May 2011, NATO hit 8 headquarters compound buildings, 12 ammunition storage and 20 vehicle storage.

== Geography ==
Hun is about halfway between Sabha and the Mediterranean coast in the Sahara Desert. The natural landscape around Hun mainly consists of black basalt mountains, with extensive sand dunes, and date palm trees - Phoenix dactylifera groves indicating oases. The cities of Waddan and Sokna are the nearest settlements. Hun is settiling in between of Waddan and Sokna, Hun is the biggest town in the area and population at Aljufra, It is considered the administrative capital of the region. There is a ruined ksar it was an Italian fort (Forti), It was restored and it is now the Saharawi Museum. There are also several old and new mosques in the city. All three towns are oases characterized by the abundance of natural springs and date palm trees.

=== Climate ===
Hun has a hot desert climate (Köppen climate classification BWh) with long, extremely hot summers and short, warm winters as well as very little rainfall throughout the year. In this part of the desert, summer daytime temperatures are a bit moderated due to the influence of the cooler offshore winds from the Mediterranean Sea, although average high temperatures consistently exceed 40 °C (104 °F) during the hottest months of the year. The region receives an average annual rainfall of 2.5 in (64 mm).

Climate data for Hun (1991–2020)
Month	Jan	Feb	Mar	Apr	May	Jun	Jul	Aug	Sep	Oct	Nov	Dec	Year
Record high °C (°F)	31.5 (88.7)	38.3 (100.9)	39.2 (102.6)	45.5 (113.9)	47.2 (117.0)	48.0 (118.4)	47.2 (117.0)	46.5 (115.7)	46.0 (114.8)	42.9 (109.2)	38.5 (101.3)	34.2 (93.6)	48.0 (118.4)
Mean daily maximum °C (°F)	19.2 (66.6)	21.1 (70.0)	25.7 (78.3)	30.6 (87.1)	34.4 (93.9)	37.2 (99.0)	38.1 (100.6)	37.7 (99.9)	36.5 (97.7)	31.9 (89.4)	25.6 (78.1)	20.4 (68.7)	29.9 (85.8)
Daily mean °C (°F)	12.2 (54.0)	13.7 (56.7)	17.8 (64.0)	22.2 (72.0)	26.2 (79.2)	29.0 (84.2)	30.0 (86.0)	30.0 (86.0)	28.5 (83.3)	24.5 (76.1)	18.2 (64.8)	13.3 (55.9)	22.1 (71.8)
Mean daily minimum °C (°F)	5.3 (41.5)	6.3 (43.3)	9.9 (49.8)	13.9 (57.0)	18.0 (64.4)	20.9 (69.6)	21.9 (71.4)	22.3 (72.1)	21.3 (70.3)	17.1 (62.8)	10.7 (51.3)	6.3 (43.3)	14.5 (58.1)
Record low °C (°F)	−4.4 (24.1)	−3.0 (26.6)	−0.2 (31.6)	0.0 (32.0)	5.2 (41.4)	10.9 (51.6)	13.0 (55.4)	16.2 (61.2)	13.5 (56.3)	5.8 (42.4)	−1.0 (30.2)	−3.1 (26.4)	−4.4 (24.1)
Average precipitation mm (inches)	5.6 (0.22)	3.6 (0.14)	3.0 (0.12)	3.5 (0.14)	1.3 (0.05)	1.1 (0.04)	0.0 (0.0)	0.2 (0.01)	1.8 (0.07)	1.5 (0.06)	1.3 (0.05)	1.9 (0.07)	24.7 (0.97)
Average precipitation days	0.9	0.9	0.7	0.3	0.4	0.2	0.0	0.1	0.3	0.4	0.3	0.5	5.0
Source: NOAA

== Economy and culture ==
There are public buses to the cities of Sirte and Sabha. There is also a military airport located between Hun and Waddan, Al Jufra Airbase. Hun is 240 km south of Sirte, 370 km from Misrata and 272 km north of Sabha. The "International Autumn Tourism Festival", is an annual festival usually held at the end of September. It is organized for four days every year from 1996. It is aimed at promoting tourism and culture and organizes concerts and exhibitions.

== See also ==
- List of cities in Libya
- Libyan Desert
