= Ahmed Omar Bani =

Libyan Air Force colonel

- Military career
- Allegiance: Libyan Arab Jamahiriya (until 2011); Libya (2011-)
- Branch: Free Libyan Air Force
- Rank: Colonel

Ahmed Omar Bani is a Libyan Air Force colonel who defected to the military of the rebel National Transitional Council. He is the current spokesman for the Libyan Ministry of Defence, taking over the position from Khaled al-Sayeh.
