= Tumu, Libya =

Tummu تومو
- Location in Libya
- Coordinates: 22.653°N 14.091°E
- Country: Libya
- Region: Fezzan
- District: Murzuq
- Time zone: UTC+2 (EET)

Tumu is a Libyan border checkpoint at the Libya–Niger border in the Murzuq District. It is 310 kilometres south of Qatrun, the closest Libyan settlement on the desert road to Chad and Niger. Tumu consists of little more than a few government shacks, and the border checkpoint is frequently closed, which requires travellers crossing from Niger to report at Qatrun.
