= Waddan, Libya =

Waddan ودان Ueddan
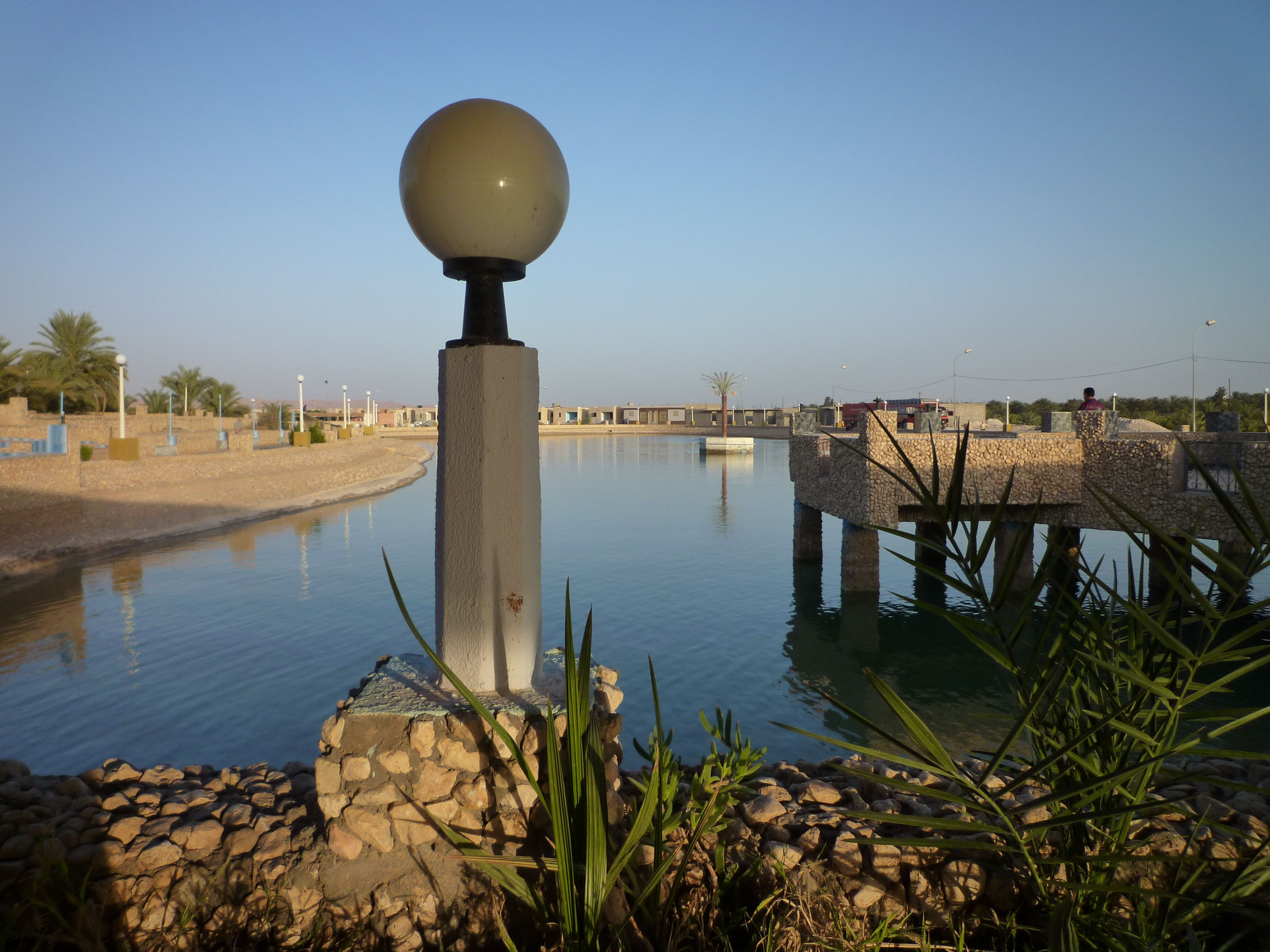
- Waddan - Thermalbad-Anlag

- Location in Libya
- Coordinates: 29°09′40″N 16°08′37″E
- Country: Libya
- Region: Fezzan
- District: Jufra
- Elevation: 807 ft (246 m)

Population (2004)
  - Total: 27,590
- Time zone: UTC+2 (EET)

Waddan (Arabic: ودان, Italian: Ueddan) is an oasis town of the Sahara Desert in the northeast Fezzan region of southwest Libya, in the Jufra District. It was an important town on the ancient trade routes across the Sahara.

== Geography ==
Waddan is the oldest city in Jufra District located 230 km (140 mi) south of Sirte, and 19 km (12 mi) northeast of Hun. The town is at the crossroads of the Sirte-Waddan Road and the Fezzan Road.

The natural springs support native date palm (Phoenix dactylifera) groves.

== History ==
In the Seventh Century C.E., Waddan was the primary town among the oasis settlements in the al-Jufra area. It was captured for Islam during the southern excursion of Amr ibn al-As in 642 C.E. by commander Busr ibn Artat, although he only extracted tribute and didn't garrison the town. However, the nephew of Amr ibn al-As, Uqba ibn Nafi, reconquered Waddan in 666-667, and established a military post there.

In the mid-13th century, Waddan was the northernmost point controlled by the Kanem Empire.

During the Libyan Civil War, NATO forces bombed an ammunition store in the town. On 8 September 2011, the town was reported to be under the control of forces allied with the National Transitional Council.

Although the Libyan government had declared in 2014 that it has destroyed all of its chemical weapons, after the fall of Gaddafi and the start of the Libyan civil wars additional chemical weapons were discovered. While the Libyan civil wars raged, some were destroyed at the GEKA facility in Germany, but the U.S. Defense Threat Reduction Agency established a chemical munitions elimination facility in Waddan, where they destroyed 570 chemical weapons over the course of its operation.

== Economy ==
The economy of the town is based primarily on the production of dates, the fruit of Phoenix dactylifera. It is a travel stop on the road from Sirte to Hun and Sawknah, and boasts its Waddan Tourist Park. Since Roman times it has been a stop on the trade route down to Chad.

Waddan has geothermal resources that have yet to be exploited.

== Archaeology ==
Above the town, in the upper stretches of Wadi Waddan, there are paleolithic rock art sites.

In Waddan are the pre-Islamic underground water irrigation channels or foggaras (al-Faqarat), as well as a number of circular tombs. The pre-Ottoman Arab fortress (Toza) has not been fully excavated. The ruins of the ancient cities of Bossi and Dalbak lie one kilometer southwest of Waddan.

== See also ==
- List of cities in Libya
