= Jufra District =

District of Libya

Coordinates: 28°N 17°E

Jufra الجفرة
- District
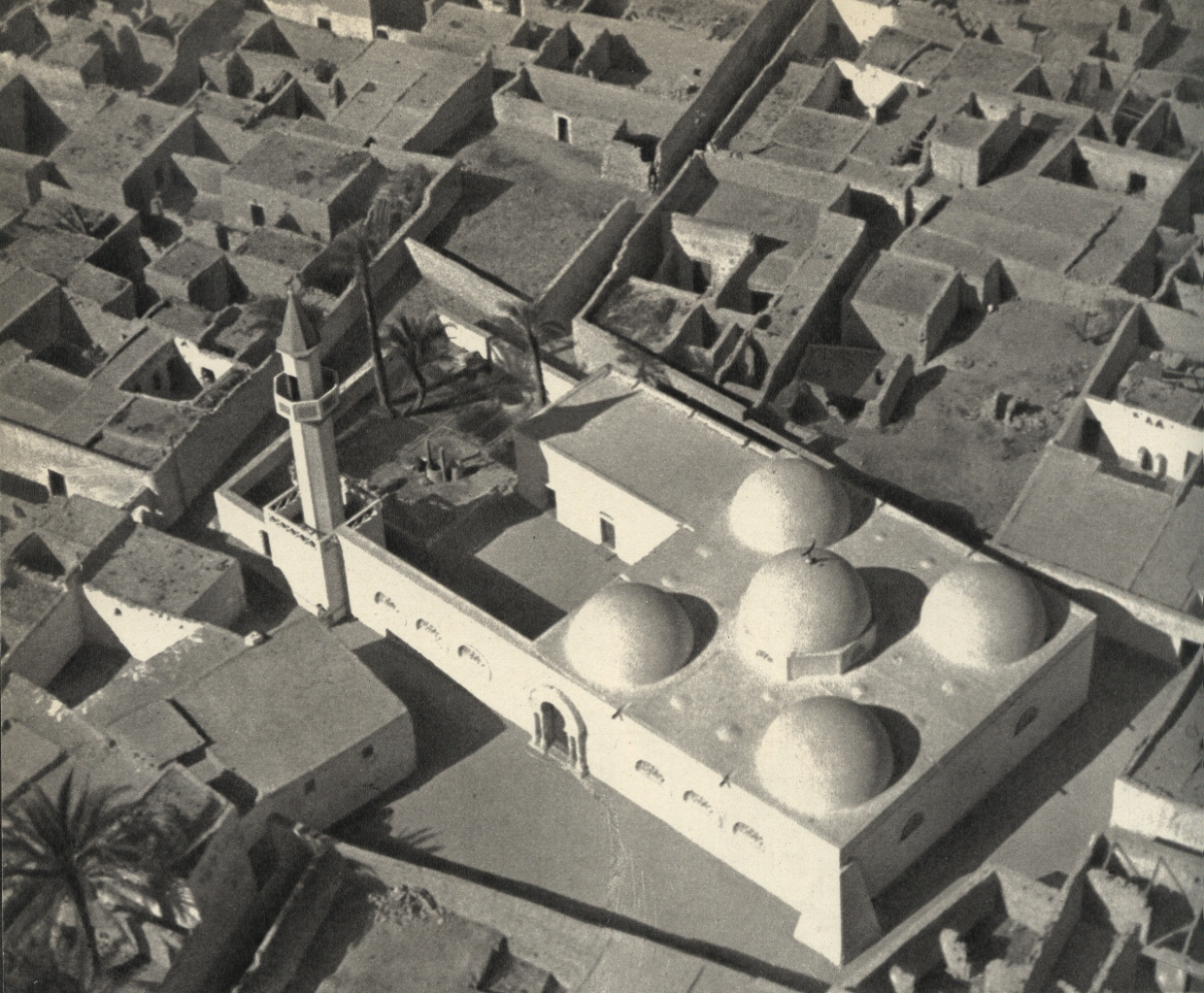

- Map of Libya with Jufra district highlighted
- Country: Libya
- Capital: Hun

Area
  - Total: 117,410 km^{2} (45,330 sq mi)

Population (2006)
  - Total: 52,342
  - Density: 0.44581/km^{2} (1.1546/sq mi)
- License Plate Code: 13

Jufra or Jofra (Arabic: الجفرة, romanized: Al Jufrah) is one of the districts of Libya. It is in the centre of the country. Its capital is Hun. Jufra was originally one of the 25 baladiya in the administrative system of Libya established in 1988. In 2001, it became a Shabiya, and its territorial extension was reduced. In 2007, under the new 22-shabiya system, its original boundaries were reintroduced. Jufra borders Sirte in the north, Zella Municipality in northeast, east and southeast, Murzuq in south, Sabha in southwest, Wadi al Shatii in west and Jabal al Gharbi in northwest.

== History and geography ==
The surrounding area of the three oases in the Jufra district (Sukna, Hun and Waddan) feature the majority of modern activity and traces of ancient occupation. The oases facilitate access to water and thus are natural concentrations of life. This chain of oases consist of substantial archaeology of several types and periods. The area, which was until recently under-studied is subject to the Trans-Saharan project, which in collaboration with the EAMENA work to identify (through satellite imagery analysis) and record a range of archaeological sites in the Jufra district. 86 individual sites were identified and include settlements, cairn cemeteries, field systems and foggara. These sites enable researchers to establish an initial chronology ranging from the first millennium BC to early modern times and develop our understanding of the occupation periods in different areas. The sites are endangered from a number of threats, most notably from construction and cultivation.

Jufra is part of Fezzan geographical division of Libya and is mostly full of deserts. The region receives an annual rainfall of 2.5 in (64 mm). There are no perennial rivers in the region, but the region is abundant with groundwater aquifers. Libya has mostly a flat undulating plain and occasional plateau, with an average elevation of around 423 m (1,388 ft). Around 91 per cent of the land is covered by desert, with only 8.8 per cent agricultural land (with only 1% arable lands) and 0.1 per cent of forests. The major resources are petroleum, gypsum and natural gas. Dust storms lasting four to eight days are common during Spring. The vast Haruj volcanic field is one of Libya's largest geographic features, visible from space.

== Demographics ==
Per the estimates of 2012, the total population in the region was 157,747 with 150,353 Libyans. The average size of the household in the country was 6.9, while the average household size of non-Libyans being 3.7. There were totally 22,713 households in the district, with 20,907 Libyan ones. The population density of the district was 1.86 persons per km^{2}. Per 2006 census, there were totally 20,127 economically active people in the district. There were 11,057 government employees, 2,315 employers, and 6,000 first level workers. There were 5,348 workers in state administration, 2,715 in agriculture, animal husbandry and forestry, 3,056 in agriculture & hunting, 4,714 in education, 1,515 in private enterprises, 763 in health & social work, 1,453 in production, 4,808 in technical work and 729 service workers. The total enrollment in schools was 15,876 and the number of people above secondary stage and less than graduation was 992. As per the report from World Health Organization (WHO), there were no communicable disease centres, one dental clinic, one general clinics, no in-patient clinics, three out-patient clinics, 12 pharmacies, 12 PHC centres, no polyclinics, one rural clinic and no specialized clinics.

== Local administration ==
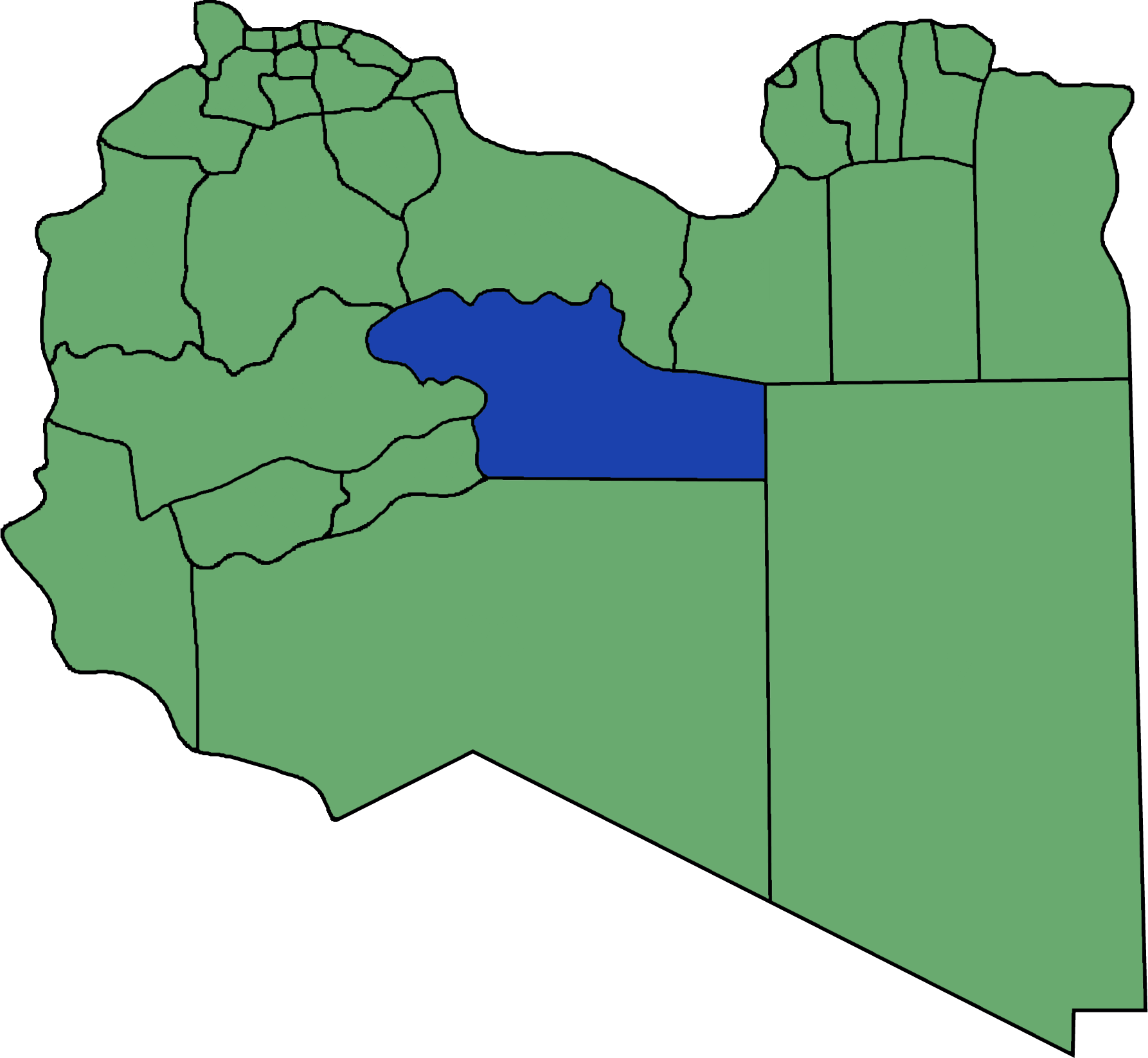
Borders of Jufra District from 2001 until 2007, under the 32-shabiya system.

Libya became independent in 1951 from Britain and France and generally known for its oil rich resources. All the powers rested centrally with the President Gaddafi for 42 years till the 2011 armed rebellion which toppled him. As per the constitution, Libya is the most decentralized Arab nation, but practically all powers are vested on central government on account of control over the oil revenues. Local governmental institutions manage the administration of education, industry, and communities. As a part of decentralization in 2012, the country is administratively split into 13 regions from the original 25 municipalities, which were further divided in 1,500 communes. Since 2015, the chief of the state is a Chairman of Presidential Council, while the Prime Minister is the head of the state. The House of Representatives is an elected body that is elected on universal suffrage and popular vote. As of 2016, there were 22 administrative divisions in the country in the form of districts.
