= Brak, Libya =

Brak براك Brach
- Town
- Location in Libya
- Coordinates: 27°32′45″N 14°16′7″E
- Country: Libya
- Region: Fezzan
- District: Wadi al Shatii
- Elevation: 1,096 ft (334 m)

Population (2004)
  - Total: 39,444
- Time zone: UTC+2 (EET)

Brak (sometimes written Biraq or Birak (Arabic: براك) is a town in the Wadi al Shatii District in west-central Libya. The town serves as the administrative center of the district, housing key government offices and public services. It is also the largest urban settlement in the region, both in terms of population and infrastructure. Its central role in governance and its size make it a vital hub for economic activity, healthcare, education, and transportation within the surrounding area.

== Overview ==
The town has a population of 39,444 (As of 2004) and is home to a technical college of Sabha University. Much of the new development in the town is occurring to the north of the old town center, which features gardens and forts from the Italian and Ottoman eras.

The technical college "Faculty of Engineering and Technology", now a college of Sebha University, was previously known as the "Higher Institute of Technology", and it is this college that gives much value to the town, as it is a well-known research and academic organization. The college comprises ten distinct departments; six of which are specialized in the engineering arm of the college, namely:

- Department of Electronic & Electrical Engineering
- Department of Civil Engineering
- Department of Petroleum Engineering
- Department of Chemistry and materials science
- Department of design and architecture
- Department of Mechanical Engineering.

The other arm, the technical arm, has three departments:

- Department of Medical Lab Technology
- Department of Food Science Technology
- Department of Environmental Sciences
- Department of General Sciences.

Graduates of this college are considered among the leading institutions in the country, as the academic and technical rank of this college is recognized. There are plans to expand this college to accommodate more students and staff and to have more departments and specialties.

== See also ==
- List of cities in Libya
