= Sabha, Libya =

Sabha سبها Sabhā
- City
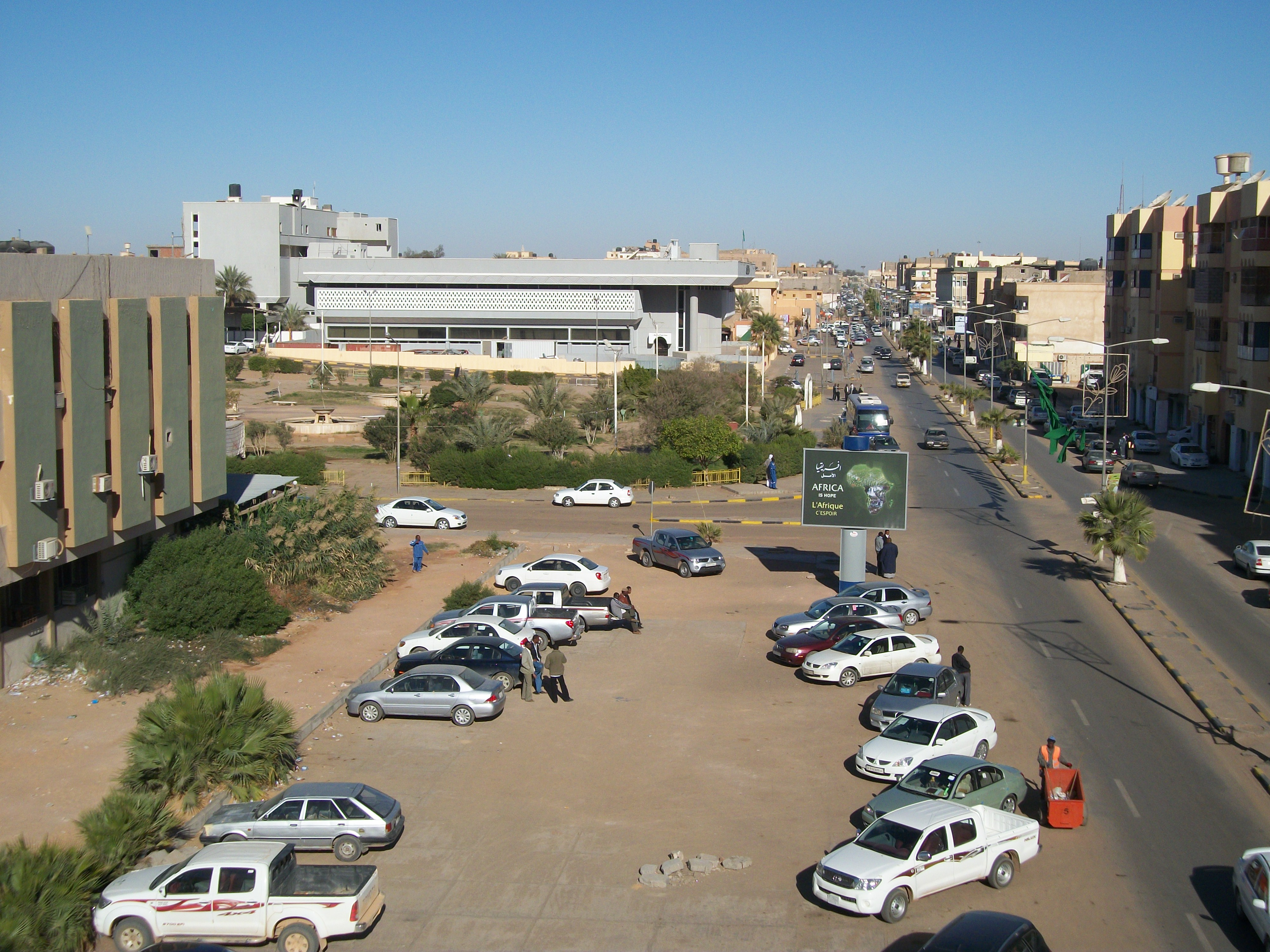
- Sebha Bank from Kazem hotel (2010)

- Location in Libya
- Coordinates: 27°02′20″N 14°25′35″E
- Country: Libya
- Region: Fezzan
- District: Sabha
- Elevation: 420 m (1,380 ft)

Population (2012)
  - Total: 99,028
- Time zone: UTC+2 (EET)
- License Plate Code: 1

Sabha or Sebha /ˈsɛb.hɑː/ (Arabic: سَبْهَا, romanized: Sabhā) is an oasis city in southwestern Libya, approximately 640 kilometres (400 mi) south of Tripoli. It was historically the capital of the Fezzan region and the Fezzan-Ghadames Military Territory and is the capital of the Sabha District. Sabha Air Base, south of the city, is a Libyan Air Force installation that is home to multiple MiG-25 aircraft.

Sabha was where the erstwhile ruler of Libya, Muammar Gaddafi, grew up and received secondary education and where he also later became involved in political activism. After the Libyan Civil War and the resultant instability in the country, Sabha reportedly grew in importance as a slave auctioning town. However, an investigation by the National Commission for Human Rights in Libya (NCHRL) revealed that while there was illegal slavery, reports were exaggerated, as slave auctions were rare and not made public. The city was seized by forces loyal to the Libyan National Army (LNA) and its leader Khalifa Haftar in January 2019, but some politicians in the area switched their loyalty to the Government of National Accord (GNA) in May 2020.

== History ==
In historical times, Sabha was a major centre of the Libyan caravan trade. Sabha Oasis, near Sabha, was the test site of OTRAG rockets, after launching was no longer possible in Shaba North in Zaire (now Democratic Republic of Congo). On 1 March 1981, an OTRAG rocket with a maximum height of 50 km (31 mi) was launched. It was also a remote test site for the Soviet Space program from 1984 to 1991.

In a 2004 report by the International Atomic Energy Agency, the Sabha base was linked with Libya's nuclear weapons program. In September 2011, Anti-Gaddafi forces seized Sabha as part of the Fezzan campaign. No sign of a nuclear weapons program was found.

In April 2017, BBC reported that there was a slave market for African migrants in Sabha.

In January 2019, forces loyal to LNA leader Khalifa Haftar launched an operation to take control of Sabha and were able to enter the city by the end of the month. On 29 January 2019, it was announced that Haftar successfully captured Sabha. In February 2019, Haftar's forces were spotted patrolling the city's neighborhoods. By May 2, 2020, politicians and activists loyal to the Tripoli-based government had announced their support of the GNA, and the city is currently under the control of pro-GNA municipal governments.

== Climate ==
Sabha

Climate chart (precipitation, max. and min. temperature)
J	F	M	A	M	J	J	A	S	O	N	D
7 19 5	0 22 7	10 26 11	7 32 16	1 36 20	0 39 24	0 38 23	0 38 23	0 36 21	0 31 17	1 25 11	1 20 6
- █ Average max. and min. temperatures in °C
- █ Precipitation totals in mm
Imperial conversion
J	F	M	A	M	J	J	A	S	O	N	D
0.3 66 41	0 72 45	0.4 79 52	0.3 90 61	0 97 68	0 102 75	0 100 73	0 100 73	0 97 70	0 88 63	0 77 52	0 68 43
- █ Average max. and min. temperatures in °F
- █ Precipitation totals in inches

Due to its location in the Sahara Desert, Sabha has a hot desert climate (Köppen BWh), with mild winters with a high diurnal temperature variation, very hot summers with temperatures reaching 40 °C (104 °F) regularly and hardly any precipitation. The average annual mean temperature is 22.7 °C (72.9 °F), the average annual high temperature is 30.2 °C (86.4 °F) and the average annual low temperature is 15.2 °C (59.4 °F). June is the hottest month, having the highest average high at 39.2 °C (102.6 °F), the highest mean at 31.4 °C (88.5 °F) and the highest average low at 23.6 °C (74.5 °F). January is the coldest month, with the lowest average high at 18.9 °C (66.0 °F), lowest mean at 11.7 °C (53.1 °F) and lowest average low at 4.5 °C (40.1 °F).

Sabha receives just 8.2 millimetres (0.32 in) of rain over 2.9 precipitation days, with a no rain in July and August and extremely little precipitation during the rest of the year. October, the wettest month, receives 2.1 millimetres (0.083 in) of rainfall over 0.6 precipitation days. Humidity is low throughout the year, with April having a humidity of just 22% and January having a humidity of 42%. Sabha receives abundant amounts of sunshine, with 3526 hours of sunshine annually on average, with the most sunshine in summer and the least in winter. July receives the most sunshine of any month with 375 hours on average, while December and February both receive the least with 252 hours.

Climate data for Sabha (1962–1990)
Month	Jan	Feb	Mar	Apr	May	Jun	Jul	Aug	Sep	Oct	Nov	Dec	Year
Mean daily maximum °C (°F)	18.9 (66.0)	22.0 (71.6)	26.1 (79.0)	31.8 (89.2)	35.7 (96.3)	39.2 (102.6)	38.3 (100.9)	37.8 (100.0)	35.9 (96.6)	31.3 (88.3)	24.9 (76.8)	20.0 (68.0)	30.2 (86.4)
Daily mean °C (°F)	11.7 (53.1)	14.4 (57.9)	18.4 (65.1)	23.9 (75.0)	27.9 (82.2)	31.4 (88.5)	30.7 (87.3)	30.4 (86.7)	28.6 (83.5)	24.1 (75.4)	17.8 (64.0)	12.9 (55.2)	22.7 (72.9)
Mean daily minimum °C (°F)	4.5 (40.1)	6.8 (44.2)	10.6 (51.1)	15.9 (60.6)	20.1 (68.2)	23.6 (74.5)	23.0 (73.4)	22.9 (73.2)	21.3 (70.3)	16.9 (62.4)	10.7 (51.3)	5.7 (42.3)	15.2 (59.4)
Average precipitation mm (inches)	1.1 (0.04)	0.8 (0.03)	0.5 (0.02)	0.5 (0.02)	0.3 (0.01)	0.5 (0.02)	0.0 (0.0)	0.0 (0.0)	0.4 (0.02)	2.1 (0.08)	0.9 (0.04)	1.1 (0.04)	8.2 (0.32)
Average precipitation days (≥ 0.1 mm)	0.3	0.3	0.3	0.2	0.2	0.1	0.0	0.0	0.2	0.6	0.4	0.3	2.9
Average relative humidity (%)	42	37	31	22	27	27	32	30	27	29	38	40	32
Mean monthly sunshine hours	260	252	269	275	304	341	375	361	295	284	258	252	3,526
Source 1: World Meteorological Organization
Source 2: Deutscher Wetterdienst (humidity and sun 1961–1990) (Note: Station ID for Sebha is 62124 Use this station ID to locate the sunshine duration)

== Landmarks ==
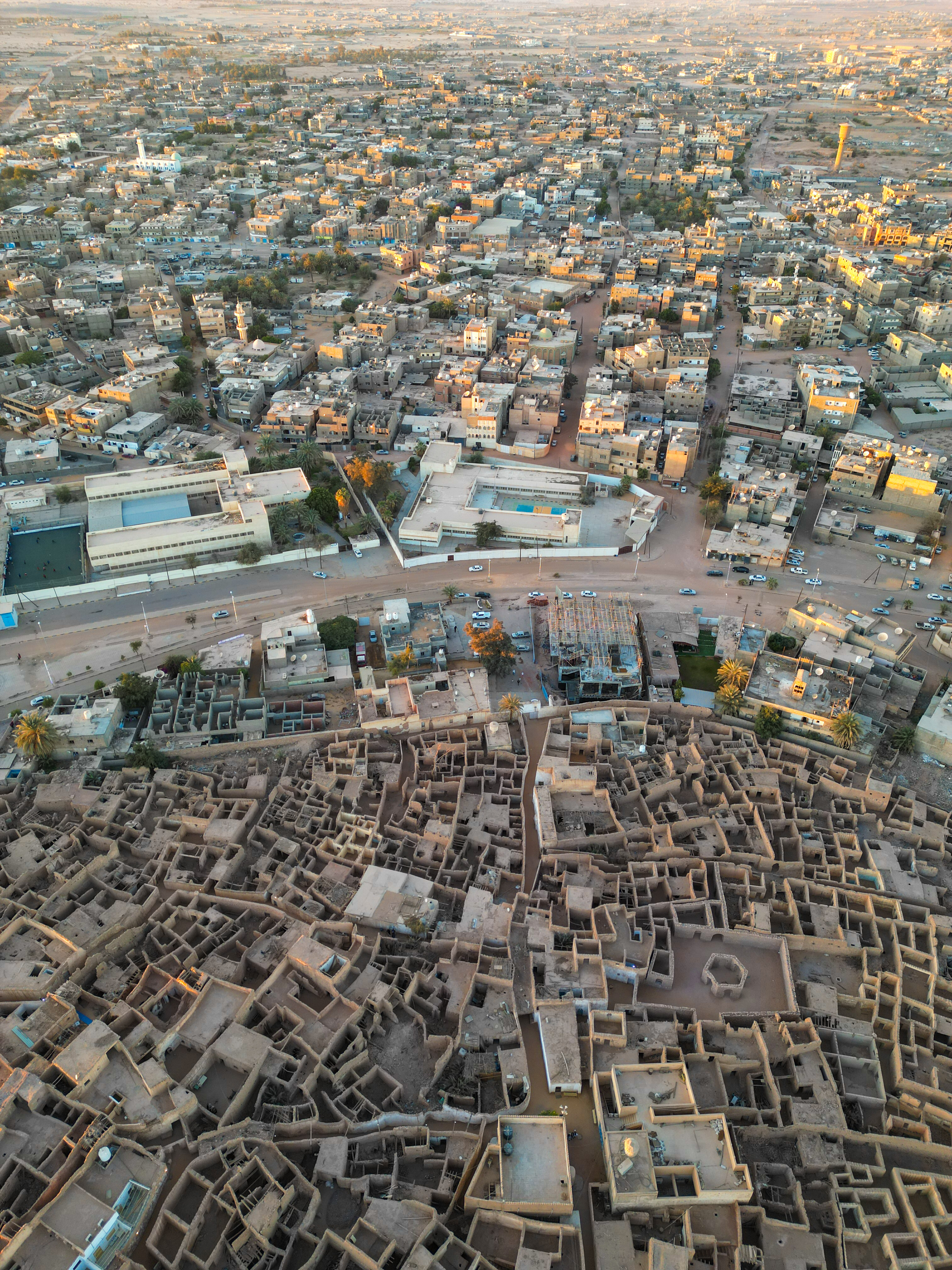
Contrast between the size of the ancient city of Sabha and modern city.

Sabha is famous for the Fort Elena castle, which is the castle featured on the reverse of the ten dinars banknote of Libya. Fort Elena was previously known as Fortezza Margherita, built during the Italian colonial period. Currently the Italian-built fort is a military institution. Sabha University is situated in the city. It has been involved with field studies in the desert. There are numerous irrigation canals, which are used to provide freshwater for growing crops.

== Transport ==
The city is served by Sabha Airport, which underwent expansion in the late 1970s. An 800 km (500 mi) long railway has been proposed from Sabha to the port of Misrata for iron ore transport.

== Reports of slave auctions ==
In 2017, The United Nations Migration Agency reported that Sabha had turned into a modern-day slave auctioning town. Each slave (mostly migrants from countries to the south of Libya, especially Nigeria) was sold for around US$325, with reports up to 1000 such sales each month. While this aspect of Sabha had been kept under check during the reign of Muammar Gaddafi, it raised its head again due to the turbulence in Libya caused by the civil war. Most of the migrants came here escaping equally tragic conditions back home in Burkina Faso, Nigeria and other neighbouring African countries. However, the National Commission for Human Rights in Libya (NCHRL) revealed that the media reports of slavery were exaggerated and that slave auctions were not public, as suggested by CNN. The slave auctions which were discovered were revealed to be rare.

== See also ==
- List of cities in Libya
- Railway stations in Libya
- 2012 Sabha conflict
- libya
