= Geography of Libya =

- Continent: Africa
- Region: North Africa
- Coordinates: 25°00′N 17°00′E
- Area
  - Total: 1,759,540 km^{2} (679,360 sq mi)
- Coastline: 1,770 km (1,100 mi)
- Highest point: Bikku Bitti, 2,266 m
- Lowest point: Sabkhat Ghuzayyil, -47 m
- Longest river: no
- Climate: desert

Libya is the fourth largest country in Africa and the seventeenth largest country in the world. It is on the Mediterranean with Egypt to the east, Tunisia to the northwest, Algeria to the west, Niger and Chad to the south, and Sudan to the southeast. Although the oil discoveries of the 1960s have brought immense wealth, at the time of its independence it was an extremely poor desert state whose only important physical asset appeared to be its strategic location at the midpoint of Africa's northern rim.

Libya lies within easy reach of the major European nations and linked the Arab countries of North Africa with those of the Middle East, facts that throughout history made its urban centres bustling crossroads rather than isolated backwaters without external social influences. Consequently, an immense social gap developed between the cities, cosmopolitan and peopled largely by foreigners, and the desert hinterland, where tribal chieftains ruled in isolation and where social change was minimal.

== Geographical summary ==
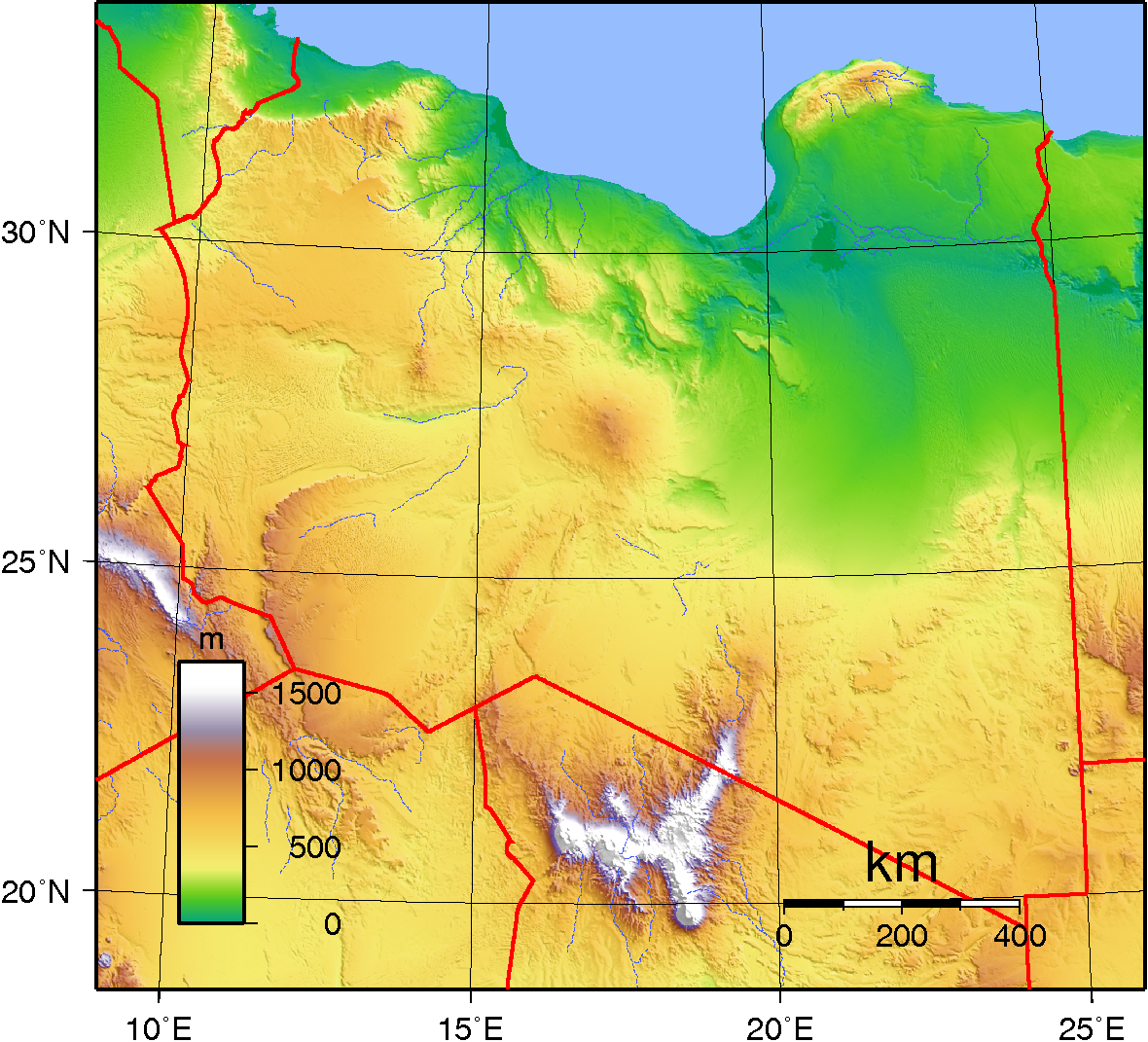
Libya's topography

The Mediterranean coast and the Sahara Desert are the country's most prominent natural features. There are several highlands but no true mountain ranges except in the largely empty southern desert near the Chadian border, where the Tibesti Massif rises to over 2,200 metres. A relatively narrow coastal strip and highland steppes immediately south of it are the most productive agricultural regions. Still farther south a pastoral zone of sparse grassland gives way to the vast Sahara Desert, a barren wasteland of rocky plateaus and sand. It supports minimal human habitation, and agriculture is possible only in a few scattered oases.

The Sahara desert is connected to the Gulf of Sidra on the coast by a barren zone, known as the Sirtica, which has great historical significance.

Along the shore of Tripolitania for more than 300 km, coastal oases alternate with sandy areas and lagoons. Inland from these lies the Jifarah Plain, a triangular area of some 15,000 square km. About 120 km inland the plain terminates in an escarpment that rises to form the Nafusa Mountains, with elevations of up to 1,000 metres, which is the northern edge of the Tripolitanian Plateau.

In the eastern part of the country, Cyrenaica, there are fewer coastal oases. Cyrenaica's Marj Plain covers a much smaller area than the corresponding Jifarah Plain of Tripolitania. The lowlands form a crescent about 210 km long between Benghazi and Derna and extend inland a maximum of 50 km. Elsewhere along the Cyrenaican coast, the precipice of an arid plateau reaches to the sea. Behind the Marj Plain, the terrain rises abruptly to form Jabal al Akhdar (Green Mountain), so called because of its leafy cover of pine, juniper, cypress, and wild olive. It is a limestone plateau with maximum altitudes of about 900 metres.

From Jabal al Akhdar, Cyrenaica extends southward across a barren grazing belt that gives way to the Sahara Desert, which extends still farther southwest across the Chadian frontier. Unlike Cyrenaica, Tripolitania does not extend southward into the desert. The southwestern desert region, known as Fezzan, was administered separately during both the Italian regime and the federal period of the Libyan monarchy. The large dune seas known as ergs of the Idehan Ubari and the Idehan Murzuq cover much of the land of Fezzan. The Haruj volcanic field is in the northeast part of Fezzan.

In 1969 the revolutionary government officially changed the regional designation of Tripolitania to Western Libya, of Cyrenaica to Eastern Libya, and of Fezzan to Southern Libya; however, the old names were intimately associated with the history of the area, and during the 1970s they continued to be used frequently. Cyrenaica comprises 51%, Fezzan 33%, and Tripolitania 16% of the country's area.

Before Libya achieved independence, its name was seldom used other than as a somewhat imprecise geographical expression. The people preferred to be referred to as natives of one of the three constituent regions. The separateness of the regions is much more than simply geographical and political, for they have evolved largely as different socioeconomic entities – each with a culture, social structure, and values different from the others. Cyrenaica became Arabized at a somewhat earlier date than Tripolitania, and Beduin tribes dominated it. The residual strain of the indigenous Berber inhabitants, however, still remains in Tripolitania. Fezzan has remained a kind of North African outback, its oases peopled largely by minority ethnic groups.

The border between Tripolitania and Tunisia is subject to countless crossings by legal and illegal migrants. No natural frontier marks the border, and the ethnic composition, language, value systems, and traditions of the two peoples are nearly identical. The Cyrenaica region is contiguous with Egypt, and here, too, the border is not naturally defined; illegal as well as legal crossings are frequent. In contrast, Fezzan's borders with Algeria, Niger, and Chad are seldom crossed because of the almost total emptiness of the desert countryside.

Other factors, too, such as the traditional forms of land tenure, have varied in the different regions. In the 1980s their degrees of separation were still sufficiently pronounced to represent a significant obstacle to efforts toward achieving a fully unified Libya.

== Area and boundaries ==
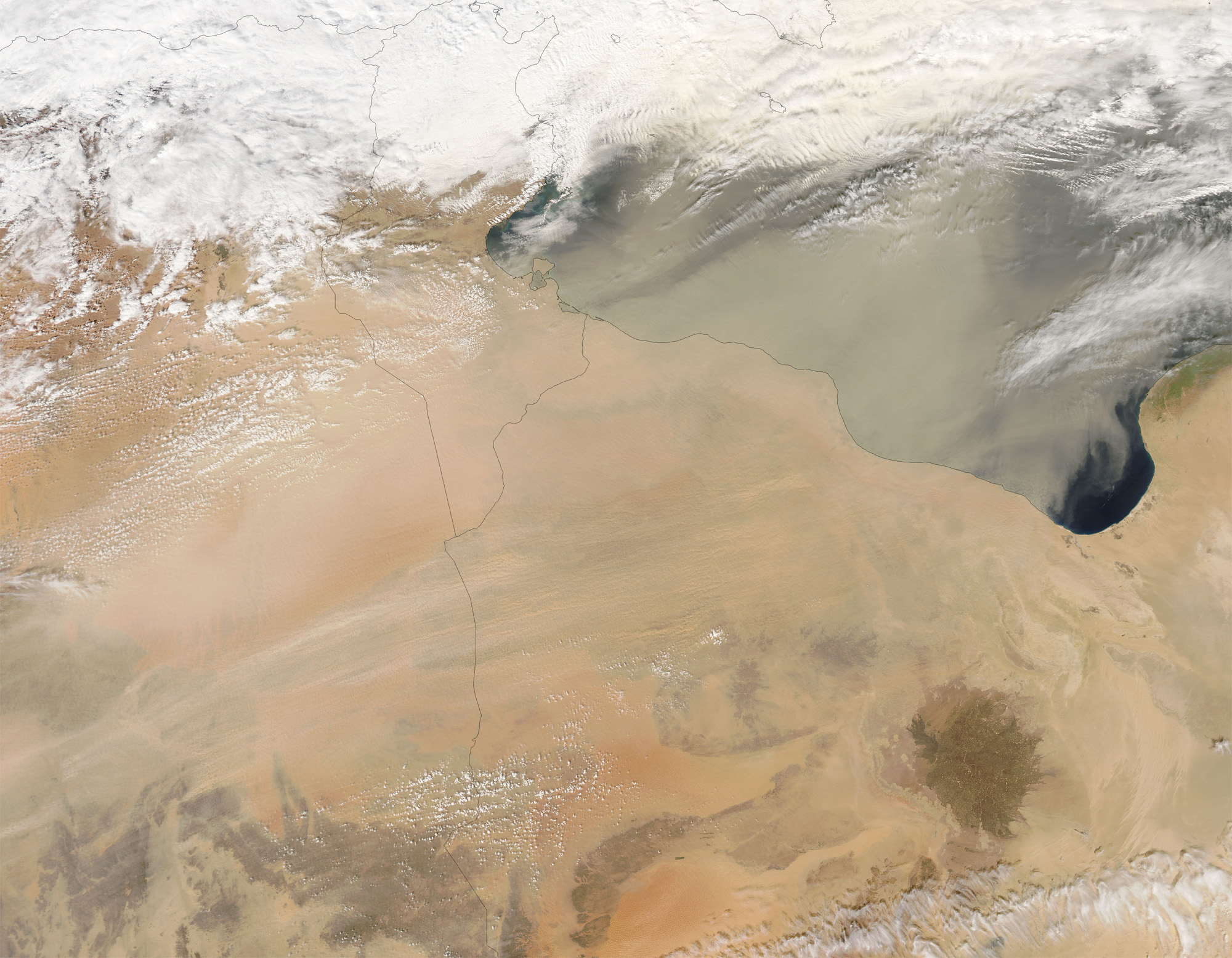
A dust storm over the Tripolitania region of Libya. Over 90% of Libya is desert.

Area:
Total: 1 759 540 km^{2}
Land: 1 759 540 km^{2}
Water: 0 km^{2}

Area - comparative: Libya is the fourth largest country in Africa, seven times the size of the United Kingdom, and slightly larger than Alaska.

Land boundaries:
Total: 4 348 km
Border countries: Algeria 982 km, Chad 1,055 km, Egypt 1,115 km, Niger 354 km, Sudan 383 km, Tunisia 459 km

Coastline: 1,770 km

Maritime claims:
Territorial sea: 12 nmi (22.2 km; 13.8 mi)
note: Gulf of Sidra closing line – 32 degrees, 30 minutes north.
Exclusive economic zone: 351,589 km^{2} (135,749.3 mi^{2})

== Climate and hydrology ==
Köppen climate classification types in Libya

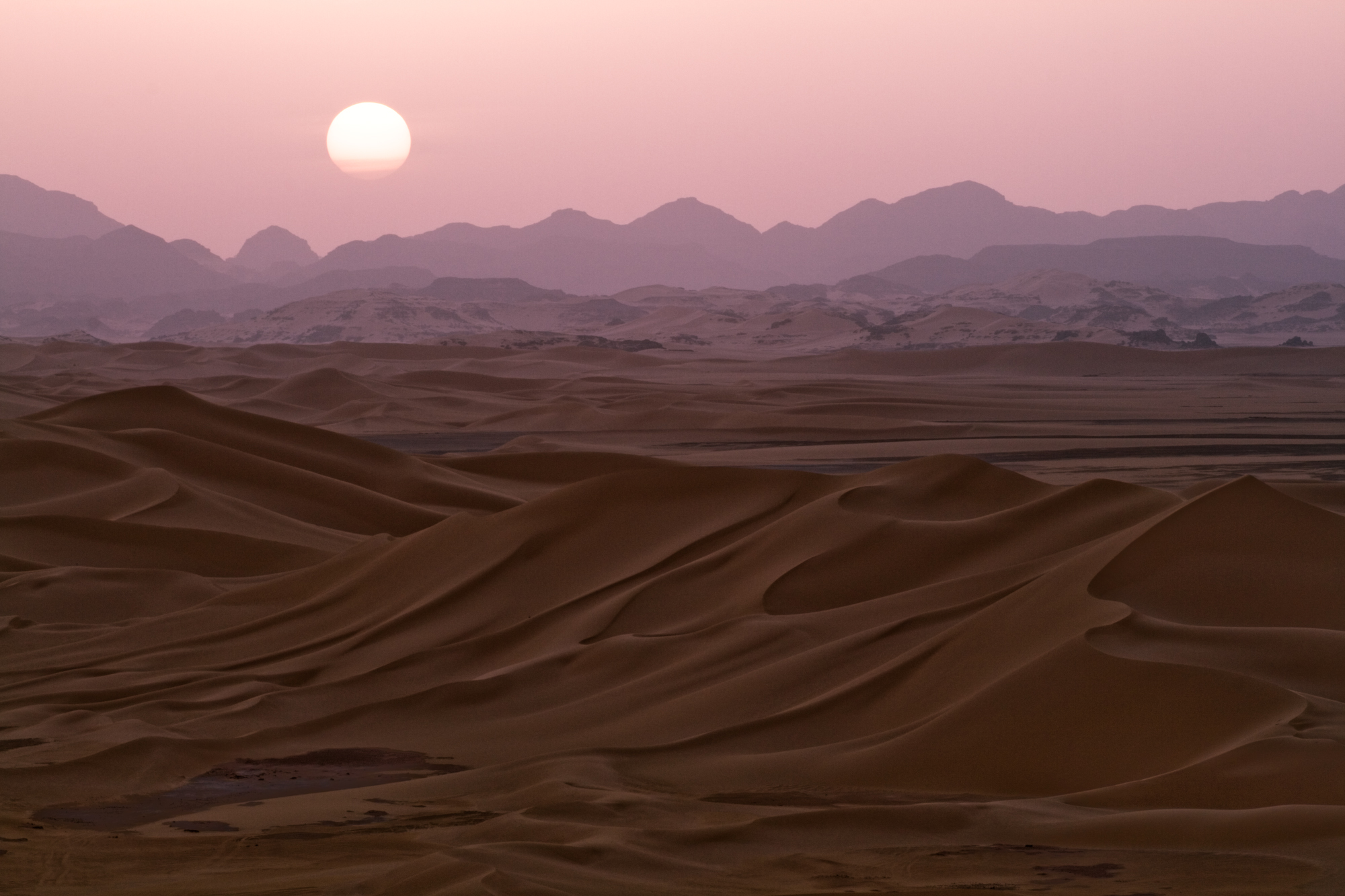
Wan Caza sand dunes in the Sahara Desert region of Fezzan

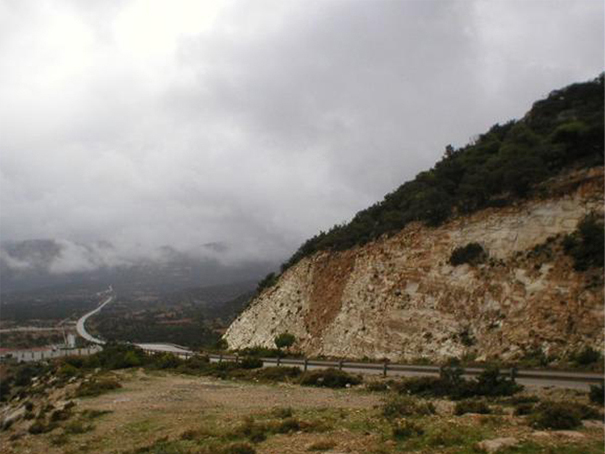
The Jabal Al Akdhar area. Annual rainfall averages between 400 and 600 millimetres (15.7 and 23.6 in).

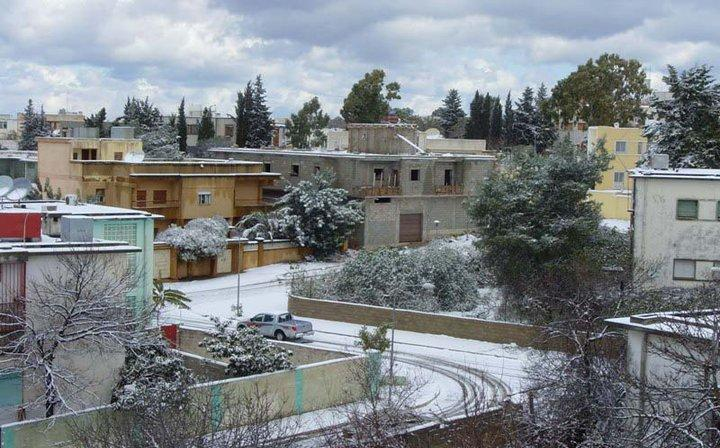
Snow in Bayda, Libya's fourth largest city

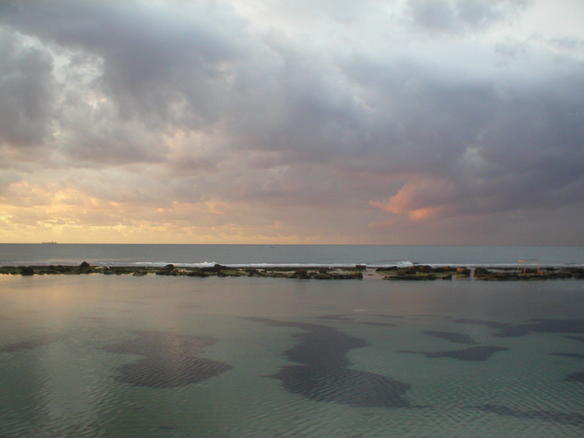
The coastline of Benghazi in the Cyrenaica, Libya's east. Libya has the longest Mediterranean coastline among African nations.

Libya is the fourth most water stressed country in the world.

Within Libya as many as five different climatic zones have been recognized, but the dominant climates are the hot-summer Mediterranean climate and the hot desert climate (Köppen climate classification Csa and BWh). In most of the coastal lowland, the climate is intense Mediterranean, with hot or very hot summers and extremely mild winters. Rainfall is scant.

The weather is cooler in the highlands, and frosts can sometimes occur at maximum elevations. In the desert interior, despite the relatively high elevation, the climate has long, extremely hot summers and high diurnal temperature ranges due to the permanence of cloudless skies and excessively dry atmosphere. The highest purported temperature ever recorded was on 13 September 1922 at ʽAziziya, Libya, but in 2012 the World Meteorological Organization discredited the dubious reading and stated that Furnace Creek in Death Valley, California had recorded the real highest temperature in the world at 56.7 °C (134.1 °F).

Less than 2% of the national territory receives enough rainfall for settled agriculture, the heaviest precipitation occurring in the Jabal al Akhdar zone of Cyrenaica, where annual rainfall of 400 to 600 mm (15.7 to 23.6 in) is recorded. All other areas of the country receive less than 400 mm (15.7 in), and in the Sahara Desert 50 mm (1.97 in) or less occurs. Rainfall is often erratic, and a pronounced drought may extend over two seasons. For example, epic floods in 1945 left Tripoli underwater for several days, but two years later an unprecedentedly severe drought caused the loss of thousands of head of cattle.

Deficiency in rainfall is reflected in an absence of permanent rivers or streams, and the approximately twenty perennial lakes are brackish or salty. In 1987 these circumstances severely limited the country's agricultural potential as a basis for the sound and varied economy Gaddafi sought to establish. The allocation of limited water is considered of sufficient importance to warrant the existence of the Secretariat of Dams and Water Resources, and damaging a source of water can be punished by a heavy fine or imprisonment.

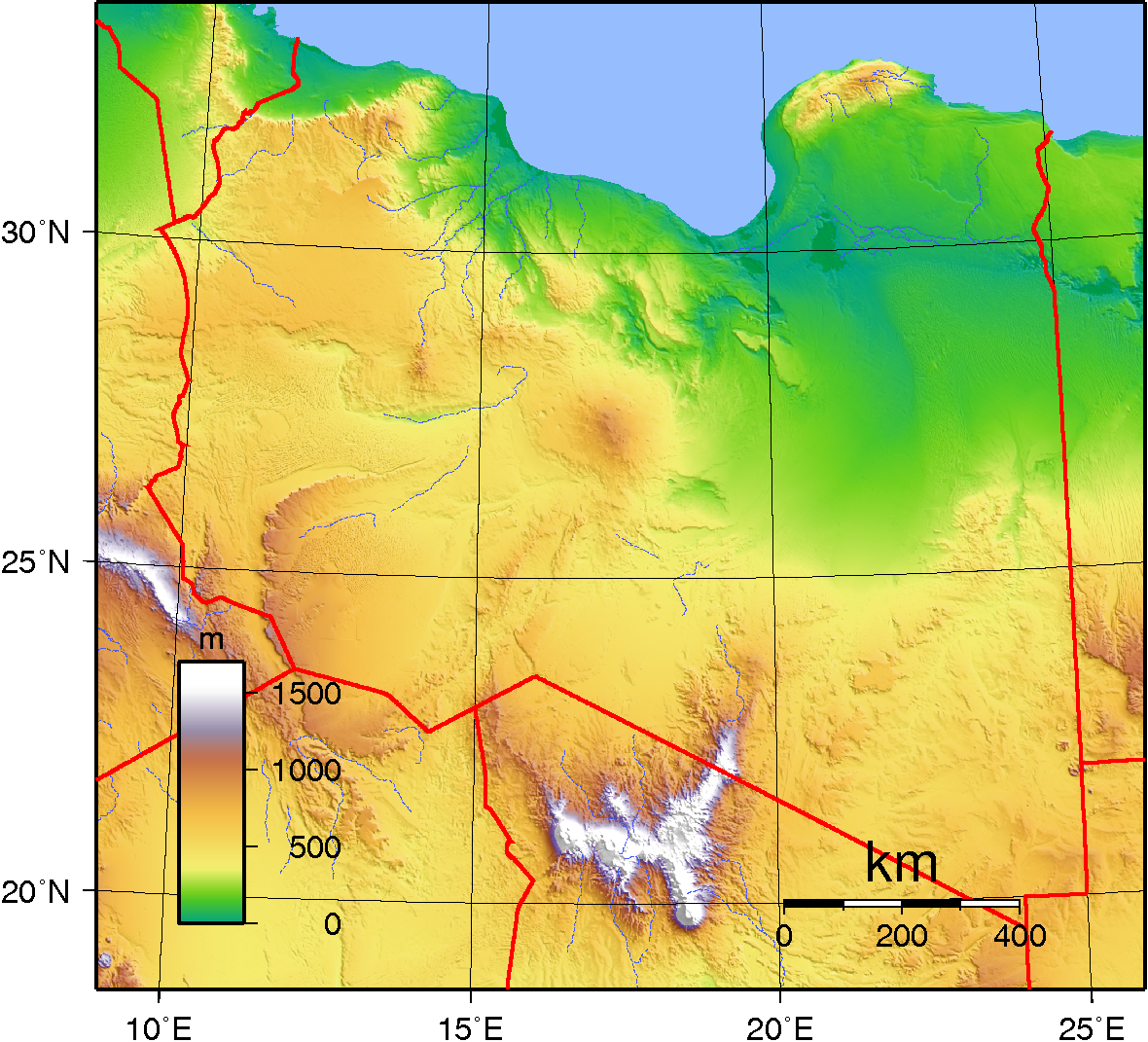

The government has constructed a network of dams in wadis, dry watercourses that become torrents after heavy rains. These dams are used both as water reservoirs and for flood and erosion control. The wadis are heavily settled because soil in their bottoms is often suitable for agriculture, and the high water table in their vicinity makes them logical locations for digging wells. In many wadis, however, the water table is declining at an alarming rate, particularly in areas of intensive agriculture and near urban centers. The government has expressed concern over this problem and because of it has diverted water development projects, particularly around Tripoli, to localities where the demand on underground water resources is less intense. It has also undertaken extensive reforestation projects.

There are also numerous springs, those best suited for future development occurring along the scarp faces of the Jabal Nafusah and the Jabal al Akhdar. The most talked-about of the water resources, however, are the great subterranean aquifers of the desert. The best known of these lies beneath Kufra Oasis in southeastern Cyrenaica. An aquifer with even greater reputed capacity is located near the oasis community of Sabha in the southwestern desert.

In the late 1970s, wells were drilled at Kufra and at Sabha as part of a major agricultural development effort. An even larger undertaking is the so-called Great Manmade River, initiated in 1984. It is intended to tap the tremendous aquifers of the Kufra, Sarir, and Sabha oases and to carry the resulting water to the Mediterranean coast for use in irrigation and industrial projects.

Climate data for Tripoli (1961–1990, extremes 1944–1993)
Month	Jan	Feb	Mar	Apr	May	Jun	Jul	Aug	Sep	Oct	Nov	Dec	Year
Record high °C (°F)	32.2 (90.0)	35.3 (95.5)	40.0 (104.0)	42.2 (108.0)	45.6 (114.1)	47.8 (118.0)	48.3 (118.9)	48.3 (118.9)	47.2 (117.0)	42.2 (108.0)	37.2 (99.0)	31.1 (88.0)	48.3 (118.9)
Mean daily maximum °C (°F)	17.9 (64.2)	19.1 (66.4)	20.7 (69.3)	23.7 (74.7)	27.1 (80.8)	30.4 (86.7)	31.7 (89.1)	32.6 (90.7)	31.0 (87.8)	27.7 (81.9)	23.3 (73.9)	19.3 (66.7)	25.4 (77.7)
Daily mean °C (°F)	13.4 (56.1)	14.3 (57.7)	16.0 (60.8)	18.7 (65.7)	21.9 (71.4)	25.3 (77.5)	26.7 (80.1)	27.7 (81.9)	26.2 (79.2)	22.9 (73.2)	18.4 (65.1)	14.6 (58.3)	20.5 (68.9)
Mean daily minimum °C (°F)	8.9 (48.0)	9.5 (49.1)	11.2 (52.2)	13.7 (56.7)	16.7 (62.1)	20.1 (68.2)	21.7 (71.1)	22.7 (72.9)	21.4 (70.5)	18.0 (64.4)	13.4 (56.1)	9.9 (49.8)	15.6 (60.1)
Record low °C (°F)	−0.6 (30.9)	−0.6 (30.9)	0.6 (33.1)	2.8 (37.0)	5.0 (41.0)	10.0 (50.0)	12.2 (54.0)	13.9 (57.0)	11.8 (53.2)	6.6 (43.9)	1.1 (34.0)	−1.3 (29.7)	−1.3 (29.7)
Average rainfall mm (inches)	62.1 (2.44)	32.2 (1.27)	29.6 (1.17)	14.3 (0.56)	4.6 (0.18)	1.3 (0.05)	0.7 (0.03)	0.1 (0.00)	16.7 (0.66)	46.6 (1.83)	58.2 (2.29)	67.5 (2.66)	333.9 (13.15)
Average rainy days (≥ 0.1 mm)	9.4	6.4	5.8	3.3	1.5	0.6	0.2	0.0	2.3	6.8	6.9	9.1	57.4
Average relative humidity (%)	66	61	58	55	53	49	49	51	57	60	61	65	57
Mean monthly sunshine hours	170.5	189.3	226.3	255.0	306.9	297.0	356.5	337.9	258.0	226.3	186.0	164.3	2,974
Mean daily sunshine hours	5.5	6.7	7.3	8.5	9.9	9.9	11.5	10.9	8.6	7.3	6.2	5.3	8.1
Source 1: World Meteorological Organization
Source 2: Deutscher Wetterdienst (extremes and humidity), Arab Meteorology Book (sun only)

Climate data for Benghazi (Benina International Airport)
Month	Jan	Feb	Mar	Apr	May	Jun	Jul	Aug	Sep	Oct	Nov	Dec	Year
Record high °C (°F)	26.3 (79.3)	31.7 (89.1)	38.0 (100.4)	39.0 (102.2)	44.8 (112.6)	45.6 (114.1)	42.4 (108.3)	43.9 (111.0)	42.1 (107.8)	38.3 (100.9)	37.2 (99.0)	30.0 (86.0)	45.6 (114.1)
Mean daily maximum °C (°F)	16.7 (62.1)	18.0 (64.4)	20.3 (68.5)	24.7 (76.5)	28.9 (84.0)	31.8 (89.2)	31.7 (89.1)	32.3 (90.1)	30.8 (87.4)	27.8 (82.0)	23.2 (73.8)	18.4 (65.1)	25.4 (77.7)
Daily mean °C (°F)	12.5 (54.5)	13.2 (55.8)	14.9 (58.8)	18.7 (65.7)	22.5 (72.5)	25.5 (77.9)	25.9 (78.6)	26.5 (79.7)	25.1 (77.2)	22.1 (71.8)	18.2 (64.8)	14.1 (57.4)	19.9 (67.8)
Mean daily minimum °C (°F)	8.3 (46.9)	8.4 (47.1)	9.5 (49.1)	12.8 (55.0)	16.0 (60.8)	19.2 (66.6)	20.2 (68.4)	20.8 (69.4)	19.4 (66.9)	16.5 (61.7)	13.3 (55.9)	9.9 (49.8)	14.5 (58.1)
Record low °C (°F)	1.7 (35.1)	1.7 (35.1)	1.7 (35.1)	3.9 (39.0)	6.1 (43.0)	10.0 (50.0)	14.8 (58.6)	14.4 (57.9)	10.0 (50.0)	10.8 (51.4)	5.6 (42.1)	3.9 (39.0)	1.7 (35.1)
Average rainfall mm (inches)	67 (2.6)	42 (1.7)	29 (1.1)	9 (0.4)	4 (0.2)	0 (0)	0 (0)	0 (0)	4 (0.2)	18 (0.7)	30 (1.2)	65 (2.6)	270 (10.6)
Average rainy days (≥ 0.1 mm)	13	8	6	2	2	0	0	0	1	4	6	12	55
Average relative humidity (%)	76	73	67	58	55	55	65	67	65	64	70	74	66
Mean monthly sunshine hours	201.5	220.4	244.9	264.0	325.5	336.0	390.6	365.8	291.0	248.0	222.0	170.5	3,280.2
Mean daily sunshine hours	6.5	7.8	7.9	8.8	10.5	11.2	12.6	11.8	9.7	8.0	7.4	5.5	9.0
Source 1: Deutscher Wetterdienst
Source 2: Arab Meteorology Book (sun only)

Climate data for Sabha (1962–1990)
Month	Jan	Feb	Mar	Apr	May	Jun	Jul	Aug	Sep	Oct	Nov	Dec	Year
Mean daily maximum °C (°F)	19.9 (67.8)	22.0 (71.6)	26.1 (79.0)	31.8 (89.2)	35.7 (96.3)	39.2 (102.6)	40.3 (104.5)	37.8 (100.0)	35.9 (96.6)	31.3 (88.3)	24.9 (76.8)	20.0 (68.0)	30.2 (86.4)
Daily mean °C (°F)	11.7 (53.1)	14.4 (57.9)	18.4 (65.1)	23.9 (75.0)	27.9 (82.2)	31.4 (88.5)	30.7 (87.3)	30.4 (86.7)	28.6 (83.5)	24.1 (75.4)	17.8 (64.0)	12.9 (55.2)	22.7 (72.9)
Mean daily minimum °C (°F)	4.5 (40.1)	6.8 (44.2)	10.6 (51.1)	15.9 (60.6)	20.1 (68.2)	23.6 (74.5)	23.0 (73.4)	22.9 (73.2)	21.3 (70.3)	16.9 (62.4)	10.7 (51.3)	5.7 (42.3)	15.2 (59.4)
Average precipitation mm (inches)	1.1 (0.04)	0.8 (0.03)	0.5 (0.02)	0.5 (0.02)	0.3 (0.01)	0.5 (0.02)	0.0 (0.0)	0.0 (0.0)	0.4 (0.02)	2.1 (0.08)	0.9 (0.04)	1.1 (0.04)	8.2 (0.32)
Average precipitation days (≥ 0.1 mm)	0.3	0.3	0.3	0.2	0.2	0.1	0.0	0.0	0.2	0.6	0.4	0.3	2.9
Average relative humidity (%)	42	37	31	22	27	27	32	30	27	29	38	40	32
Mean monthly sunshine hours	260	252	269	275	304	341	375	361	295	284	258	252	3,526
Source 1: World Meteorological Organization
Source 2: Deutscher Wetterdienst (humidity and sun 1961–1990) (Note: Station ID for Sebha is 62124 Use this station ID to locate the sunshine duration)

Climate data for Kufra (Altitude: 435 m or 1,427 ft)
Month	Jan	Feb	Mar	Apr	May	Jun	Jul	Aug	Sep	Oct	Nov	Dec	Year
Mean daily maximum °C (°F)	21.0 (69.8)	23.0 (73.4)	28.0 (82.4)	33.0 (91.4)	37.0 (98.6)	39.0 (102.2)	38.0 (100.4)	38.0 (100.4)	35.0 (95.0)	32.0 (89.6)	27.0 (80.6)	22.0 (71.6)	31.1 (88.0)
Daily mean °C (°F)	13.0 (55.4)	15.0 (59.0)	19.5 (67.1)	24.0 (75.2)	28.5 (83.3)	30.5 (86.9)	30.5 (86.9)	30.5 (86.9)	27.5 (81.5)	24.5 (76.1)	19.0 (66.2)	14.0 (57.2)	23.0 (73.5)
Mean daily minimum °C (°F)	5.0 (41.0)	7.0 (44.6)	11.0 (51.8)	15.0 (59.0)	20.0 (68.0)	22.0 (71.6)	23.0 (73.4)	23.0 (73.4)	20.0 (68.0)	17.0 (62.6)	11.0 (51.8)	6.0 (42.8)	15.0 (59.0)
Average rainfall mm (inches)	0 (0)	0 (0)	0 (0)	0 (0)	0 (0)	0 (0)	0 (0)	1 (0.0)	0 (0)	0 (0)	0 (0)	0 (0)	1 (0.0)
Average rainy days	0	0	0	0	0	0	0	0	0	0	0	0	0
Average relative humidity (%)	45	38	33	28	24	23	23	23	27	31	42	48	32
Mean monthly sunshine hours	279	262	294	286	306	342	384	374	301	298	292	266	3,689
Percentage possible sunshine	84	83	80	76	75	85	93	94	85	84	90	82	84
Source: Climatemps.com

Climate data for Bayda
Month	Jan	Feb	Mar	Apr	May	Jun	Jul	Aug	Sep	Oct	Nov	Dec	Year
Mean daily maximum °C (°F)	11.8 (53.2)	12.9 (55.2)	15.6 (60.1)	19.6 (67.3)	23.4 (74.1)	27.2 (81.0)	26.9 (80.4)	26.7 (80.1)	25.5 (77.9)	23.7 (74.7)	19.0 (66.2)	14.5 (58.1)	20.6 (69.0)
Daily mean °C (°F)	7.9 (46.2)	8.4 (47.1)	10.6 (51.1)	13.7 (56.7)	17.1 (62.8)	20.6 (69.1)	21.4 (70.5)	21.4 (70.5)	20.0 (68.0)	18.1 (64.6)	14.2 (57.6)	10.3 (50.5)	15.3 (59.6)
Mean daily minimum °C (°F)	4.0 (39.2)	4.0 (39.2)	5.6 (42.1)	7.8 (46.0)	10.8 (51.4)	14.0 (57.2)	16.0 (60.8)	16.1 (61.0)	14.5 (58.1)	12.6 (54.7)	9.0 (48.2)	5.1 (41.2)	10.0 (49.9)
Average precipitation mm (inches)	121 (4.8)	105 (4.1)	58 (2.3)	25 (1.0)	9 (0.4)	2 (0.1)	0 (0)	0 (0)	6 (0.2)	38 (1.5)	55 (2.2)	121 (4.8)	540 (21.4)
Source: Climate-data.org

== Terrain and land use ==
Terrain: mostly barren, flat to undulating plains, plateaus, depressions

Elevation extremes:
lowest point: Sabkhat Ghuzayyil -47 m
highest point: Bikku Bitti 2,267 m

Natural resources: petroleum, natural gas, gypsum

Land use:
arable land: 0.99%
permanent crops: 0.19%
other: 98.82% (2011)

Irrigated land: 4,700 km^{2} (2003)

Total renewable water resources: 0.7 0.7 km^{3} (0.17 cu mi) (2011)

== Environmental issues ==
Natural hazards: hot, dry, dust-laden ghibli is a southern wind lasting one to four days in spring and fall; dust storms, sandstorms

Environment - current issues: desertification; very limited natural fresh water resources; the Great Manmade River Project, the largest water development scheme in the world, is being built to bring water from large aquifers under the Sahara to coastal cities

Environment - international agreements:
party to: Biodiversity, Climate Change, Climate Change-Kyoto Protocol Desertification, Endangered Species, Hazardous Wastes, Marine Dumping, Ozone Layer Protection, Ship Pollution, Wetlands
signed, but not ratified: Law of the Sea

== Extreme points ==
This is a list of the extreme points of Libya, the points that are farther north, south, east or west than any other location.

- Northernmost point – Ras Ajdir at the point where the border with Tunisia enters the Mediterranean Sea, Nuqat al Khams District
- Easternmost point – Marsa er Ramla at the point where the border with Egypt enters the Mediterranean Sea, Butnan District
- Southernmost point - the tripoint with Chad and Sudan, Kufra District
- Westernmost point - unnamed point on the border with Algeria immediately east of Ghadames, Nalut District

== See also ==
- Cyrenaica
- Fezzan
- List of cities in Libya
- Tripolitania
- Transliteration of Libyan placenames
