= Erg Iguidi =

Desert area in Algeria

Coordinates: 26.255°N 6.298°W

Erg Iguidi عرق إقيدي
- Erg
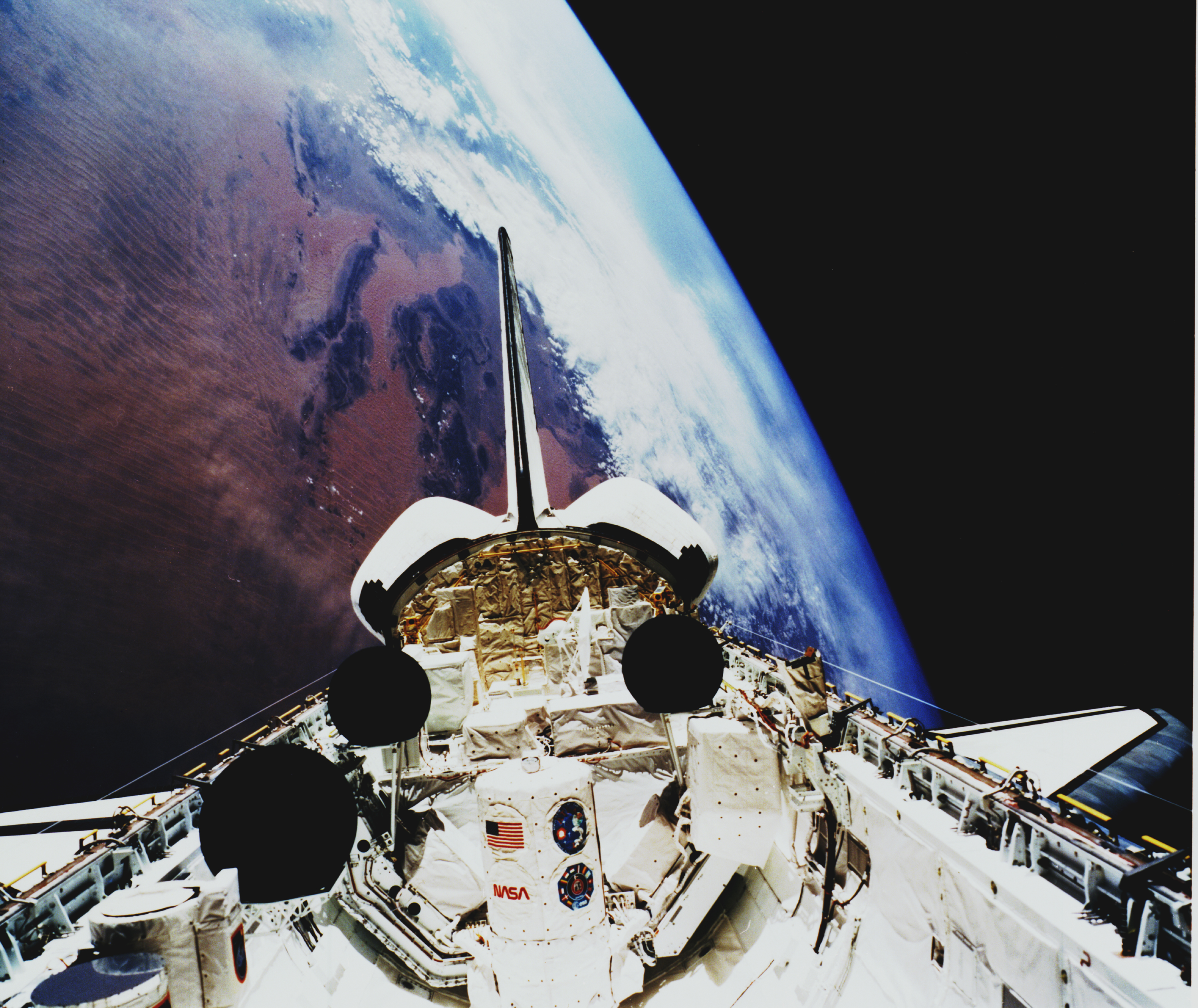
- Picture of the STS-45 showing the dune pattern of the Erg Iguidi in the upper left corner.

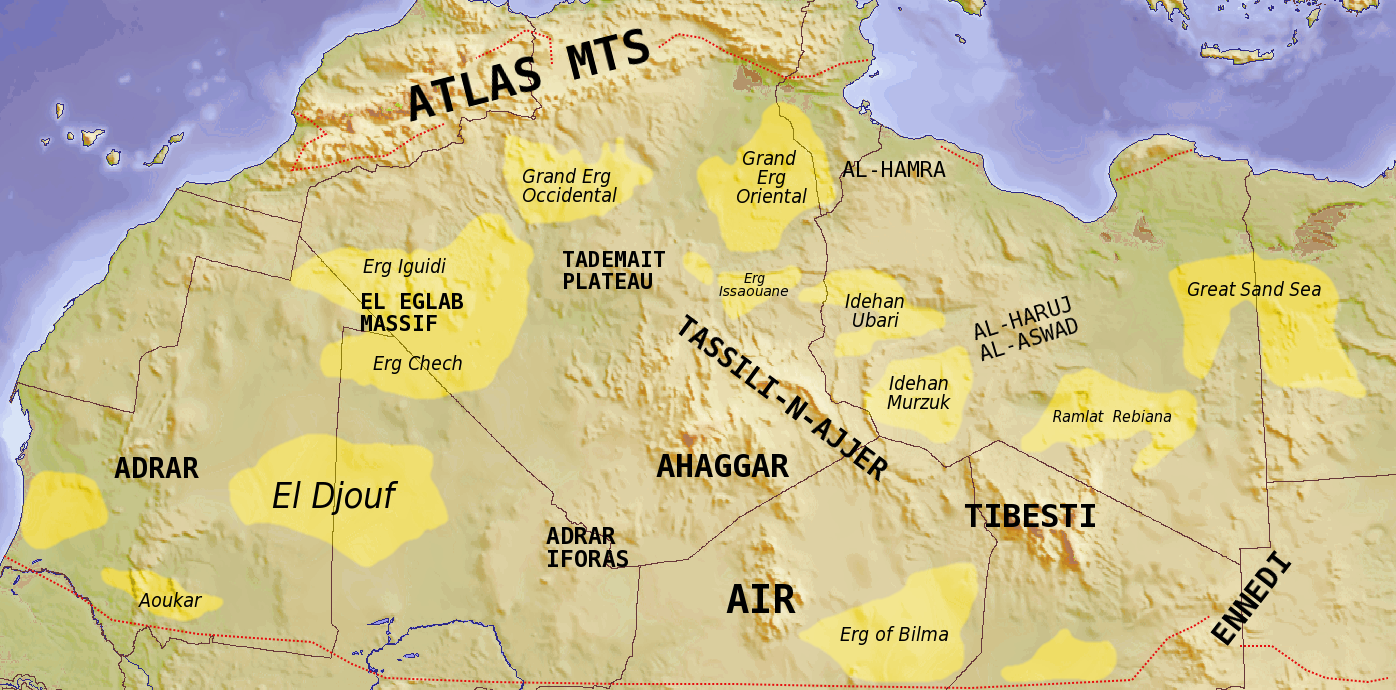
- Map of the Sahara showing the Erg Iguidi.
- Country: Algeria, Mali and Mauritania
- Elevation: 410 m (1,350 ft)

The Erg Iguidi (Arabic: عرق إقيدي), is a large erg in the area of Tindouf in southwestern Algeria, extending into northern Mali and Mauritania.

== Geography ==
The Erg Iguidi is a sandy desert with a clear pattern of narrow linear dunes stretching for a length of 400 km. Part of the greater Sahara, it is located in its northwestern region and is characterized by Harmattan withering winds. The highest point is 540 m.

Compared to the neighboring Erg Chech to the south, this erg is relatively humid. Groundwater is especially abundant towards the north-eastern edge of the Erg Iguidi. There are patches of seasonal vegetation with grasses and shrubs and in the summer the desert is used as a pasturage area. The Erg Iguidi supports a population of slender-horned gazelle.

== See also ==
- Geography of Algeria
- List of ergs
