= List of ergs =

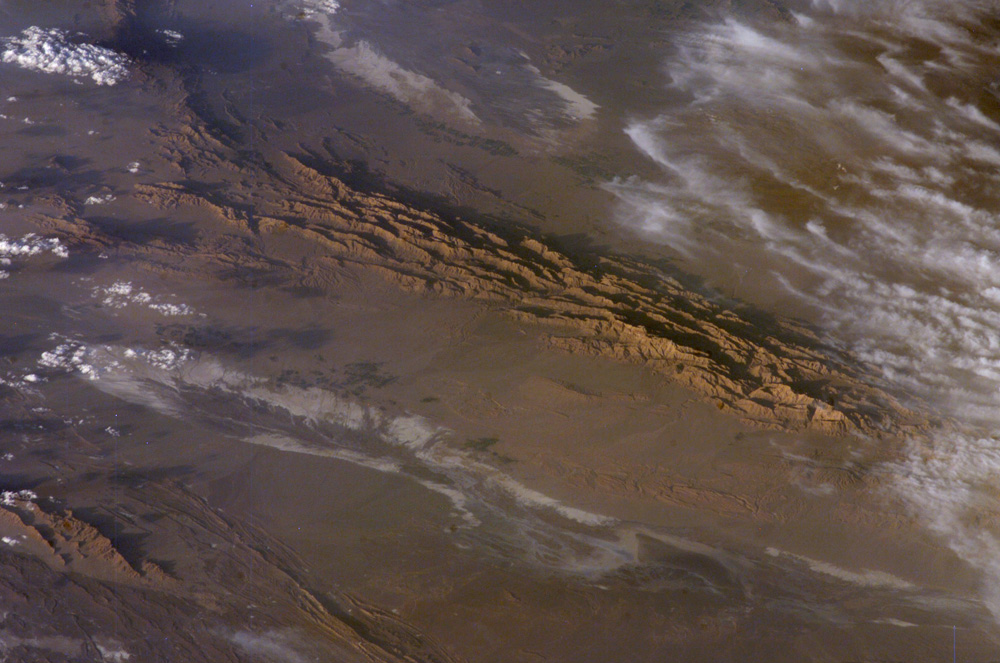
Dasht-e Lut, Iran, as seen from space.

In geomorphology, an erg is a large desert region of sand dunes with little or no vegetation. It is divided into 3 parts: back erg, central erg, fore erg, especially in the Sahara. This is a list of ergs around the world.

== Africa ==
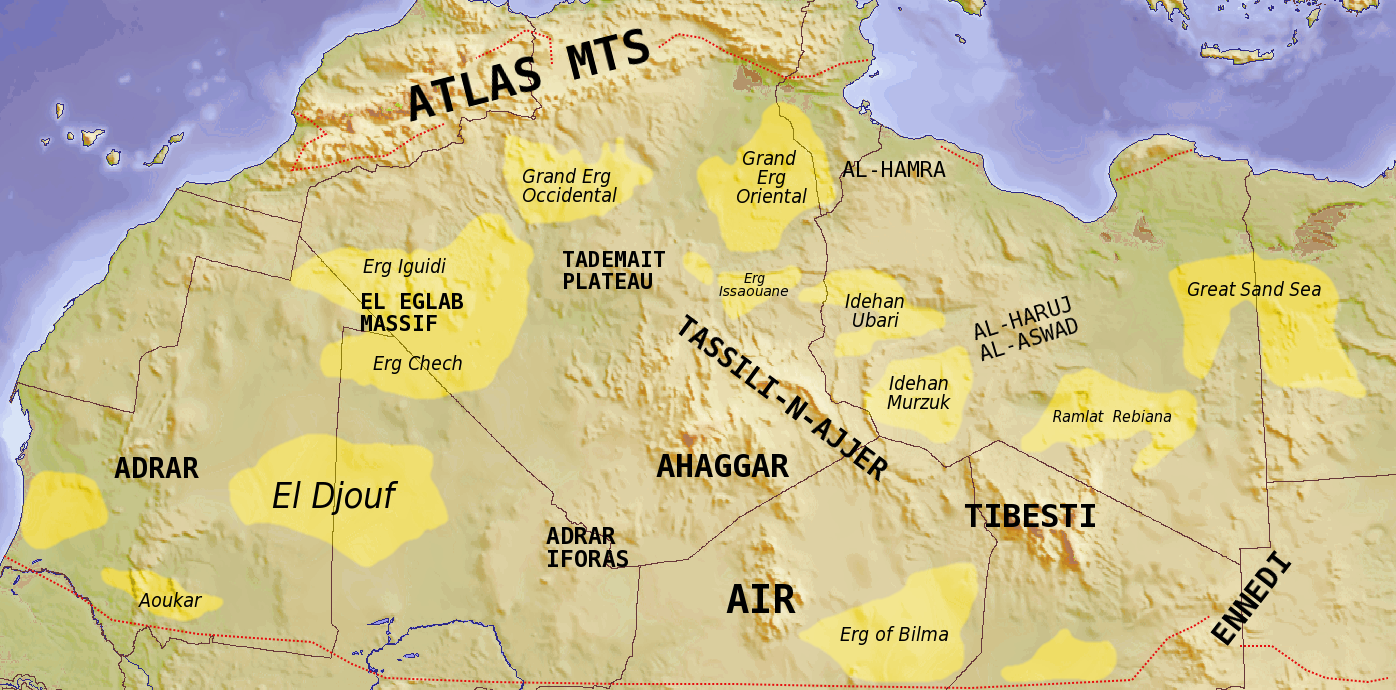
The major ergs of the Saharan region.

Algeria

- Grand Erg Oriental (extends into Tunisia)
- Grand Erg Occidental
- Erg Chech (extends into Mali and Mauritania)
- Erg Iguidi (extends into Mauritania)
- Erg Issaouane
- Erg er-Raoui
- Erg Tifferine
- Erg Tidohaine
- Erg Merhiti
- Erg Admer

Botswana

- Kalahari Desert

Chad

- Erg Djourab
- Erg Idrisi

Egypt

- Black Desert
- Erg Abunugar
- Erg Abu Muharrik
- Erg Abu Ramada
- Gilf Kebir
- Ramla el Kebir
- Erg Somaya
- Negev Desert (extends into Israel)
- Great Sand Sea Desert
- White Desert

Libya

- Erg Awbari
- Erg Ubari
- Erg Titersine
- Erg Idehan Murzuq
- Erg Ouan Kasa
- Erg Tannezouft
- Erg Takarkouri
- Erg Mehedjibat
- Erg Tassegefit
- Calanshio Sand Sea
- Rebiana Sand Sea

Mali

- Erg Achaif
- Erg Aoukar (extends into Mauritania)
- Erg Atouila
- Erg Outouila

Mauritania

- Erg Amatlich
- Erg Aoukar
- Erg Akchar
- Erg Azefal (extends into Western Sahara)
- Erg Taokest

Morocco

- Erg Chebbi
- Erg Chigaga
- Erg Znaigui
- Erg Tinfou
- Erg Ezzahar
- Erg Lihoudi
- Erg Mghiti
- Erg Smar
- Erg Jerboia
- Erg Zemoul

Namibia

- Namib Desert

Niger

- Jadal
- Erg Brousset
- Ténéré
- Tafassasset
- Great Bilma Erg or 'Kaouar' (extends into Chad)

Sudan

- Erg Selima

Western Sahara

- Erg Azefal

== Asia ==
China

- Taklamakan, Xinjiang
- Dzungaria, Xinjiang
- Tengger Desert, Ningxia
- Ordos Desert, Inner Mongolia

Iran

- Dasht-e Lut

India

- Thar Desert
- Nubra Valley

Kazakhstan

- Moin Kum
- Kyzyl Kum (extends into Uzbekistan and Turkmenistan)

Mongolia

- Nomin Mingan Gobi

Pakistan

- Cholistan Desert
- Kharan Desert

Saudi Arabia

- Rub' al Khali
- Dahna
- Great Nefud
- Jafurah
- Nefud Es Sirr
- Nefud Eth Thuwairat
- Nefud Shudaiah

Turkmenistan

- Karakum Desert
- Turan
- Zaunguz

== Australia ==
- Gibson Desert
- Great Sandy Desert
- Great Victoria Desert
- Simpson Desert

== North America ==
Mexico

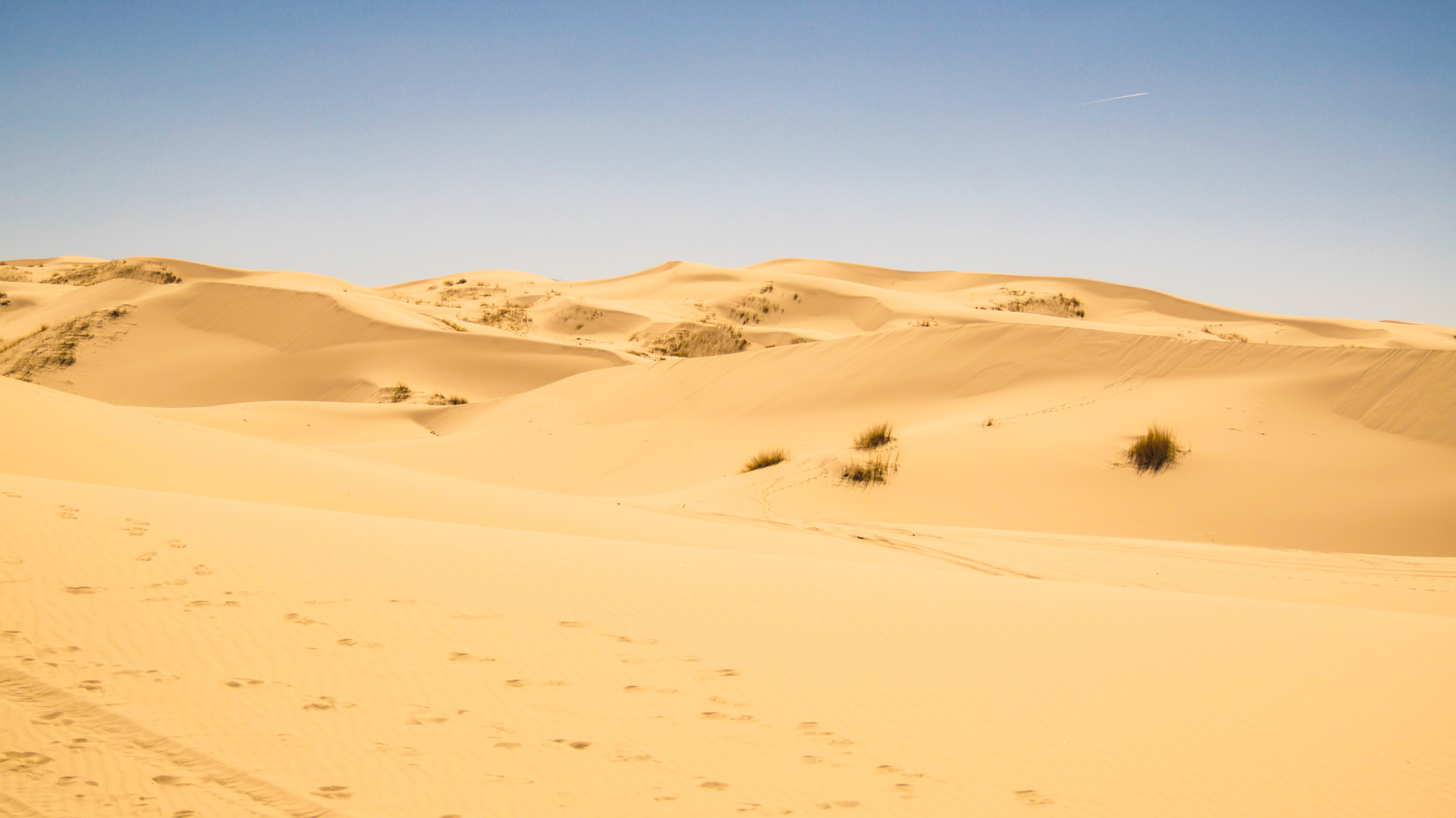
Samalayuca Dunes, Chihuahua, Mexico

- Gran Desierto de Altar, Sonora
- Samalayuca Dune Fields, Chihuahua

United States

- Algodones Dunes, California
- Great Sand Dunes National Park and Preserve, Colorado
- Navajo Sandstone (former Jurassic age erg has since formed sandstone)
- Nebraska Sandhills, Nebraska (active 800-1000 years ago, now vegetated)
- White Sands National Park, New Mexico
- Yuma Desert, Arizona

== South America ==
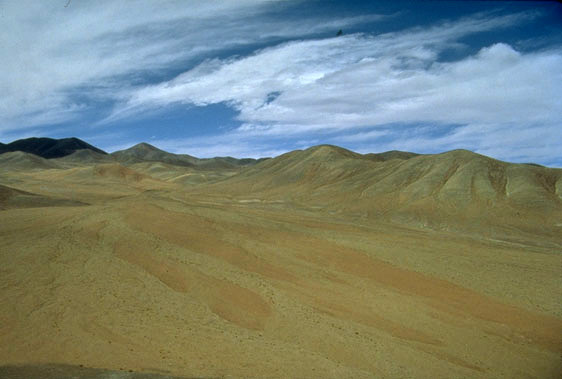
Atacama Desert, Chile

Chile

- Atacama Desert

Peru

- Great Ica Desert
