= Idehan Ubari =

Idehan Ubari أدهان أوباري
- Erg
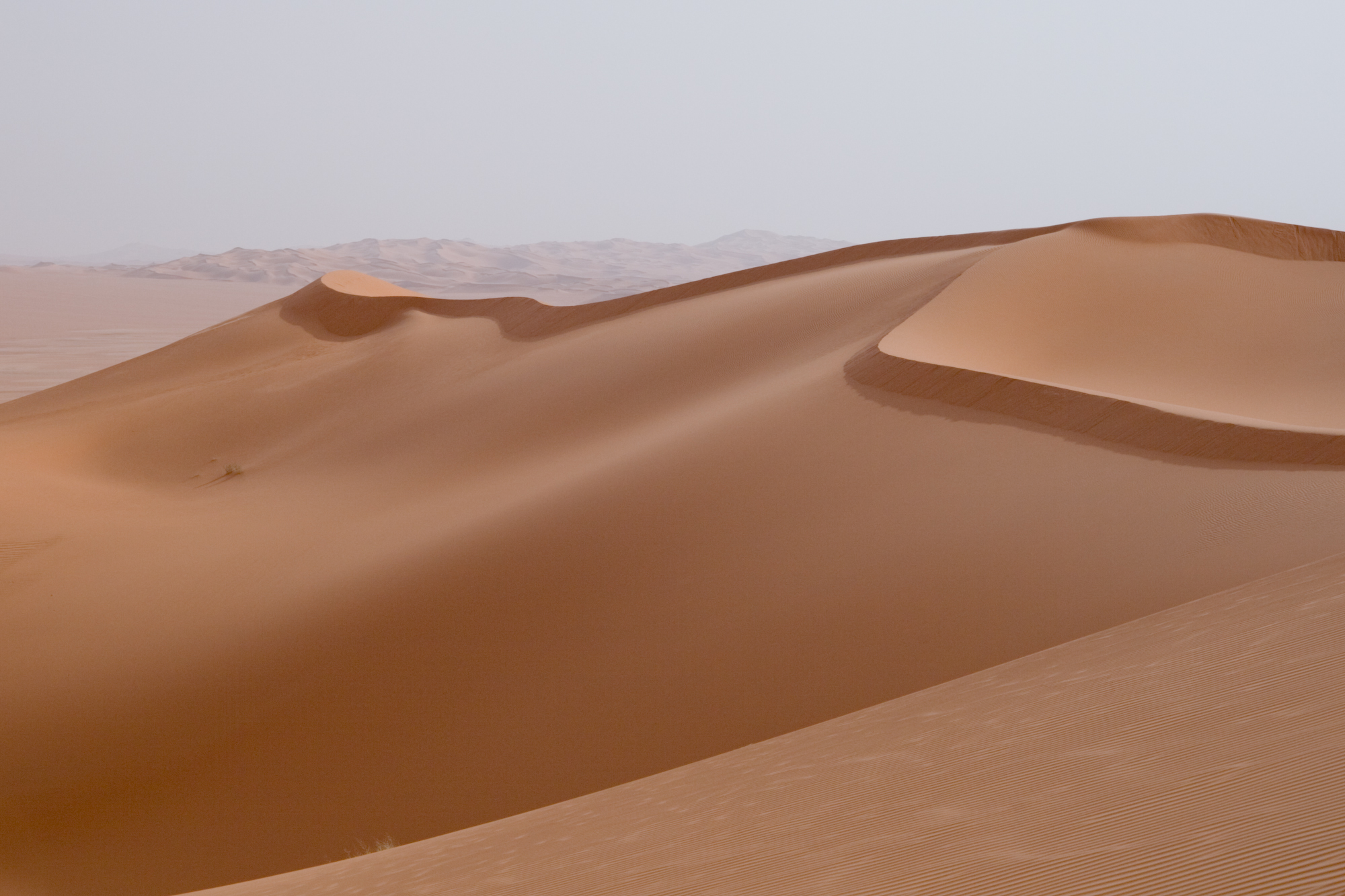
- Landscape of Idehan Ubari dunes.

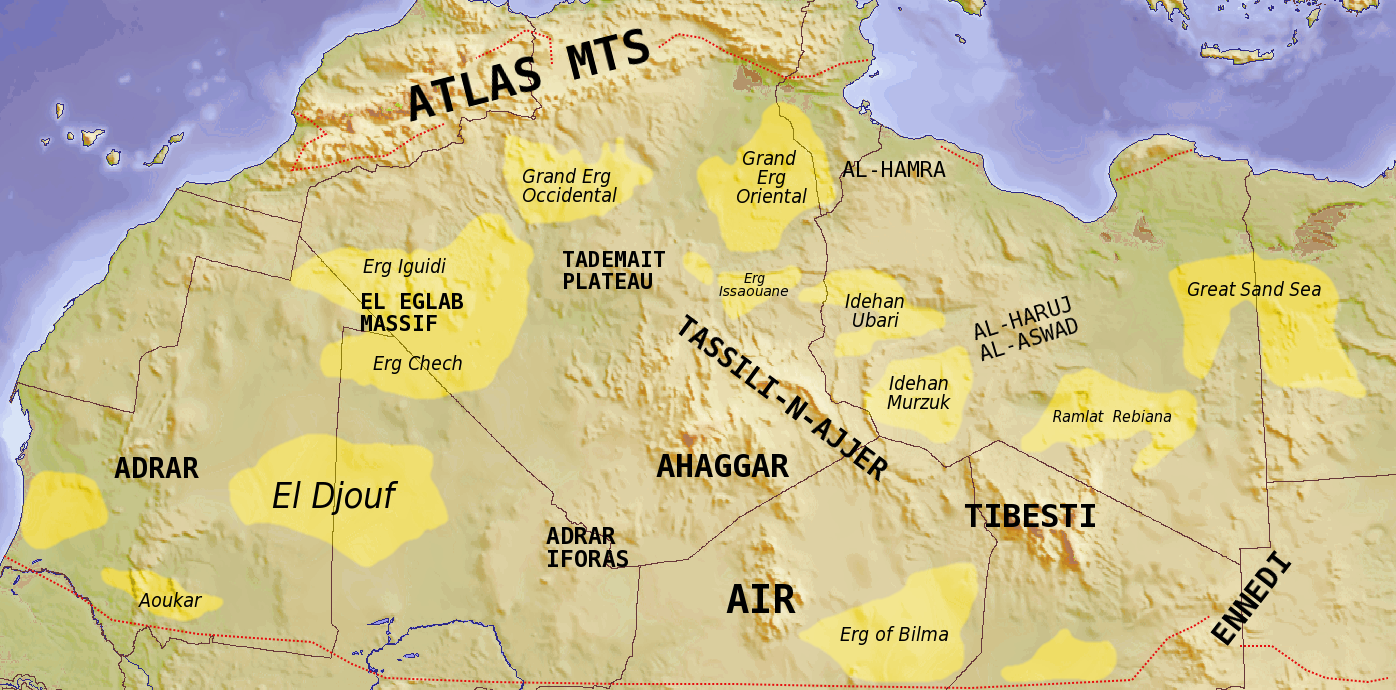
- Map of the topographic features of the Sahara

- Location within Libya
- Coordinates: 27°30′N 11°30′E
- Country: Libya

Area
  - Total: 62,000 km^{2} (24,000 sq mi)
- Elevation: 530 m (1,740 ft)

The Ubari Desert, Idehan Ubari, Idehan Awbari (Idehan means fine sand in Tamasheq) or Ubari Erg is an erg in the hyper-arid Fezzan region of southwestern Libya with a surface area of approximately 58,000 km^{2}. The area of the Ubari desert has been traditionally inhabited by Tuareg people, a Berber ethnic and traditionally nomadic pastoralist group.

== Geography ==
The Idehan Ubari is named after the town of Ubari or Awbari, a Berber-speaking oasis town and the capital of the Wadi al Hayaa District in the area. Like the Idehan Marzuq further south, the Idehan Ubari is part of the greater Sahara Desert.

The Mandara Lakes are located in Gaberoun, an oasis in the eastern zone of the Ubari Desert.

The Oasis
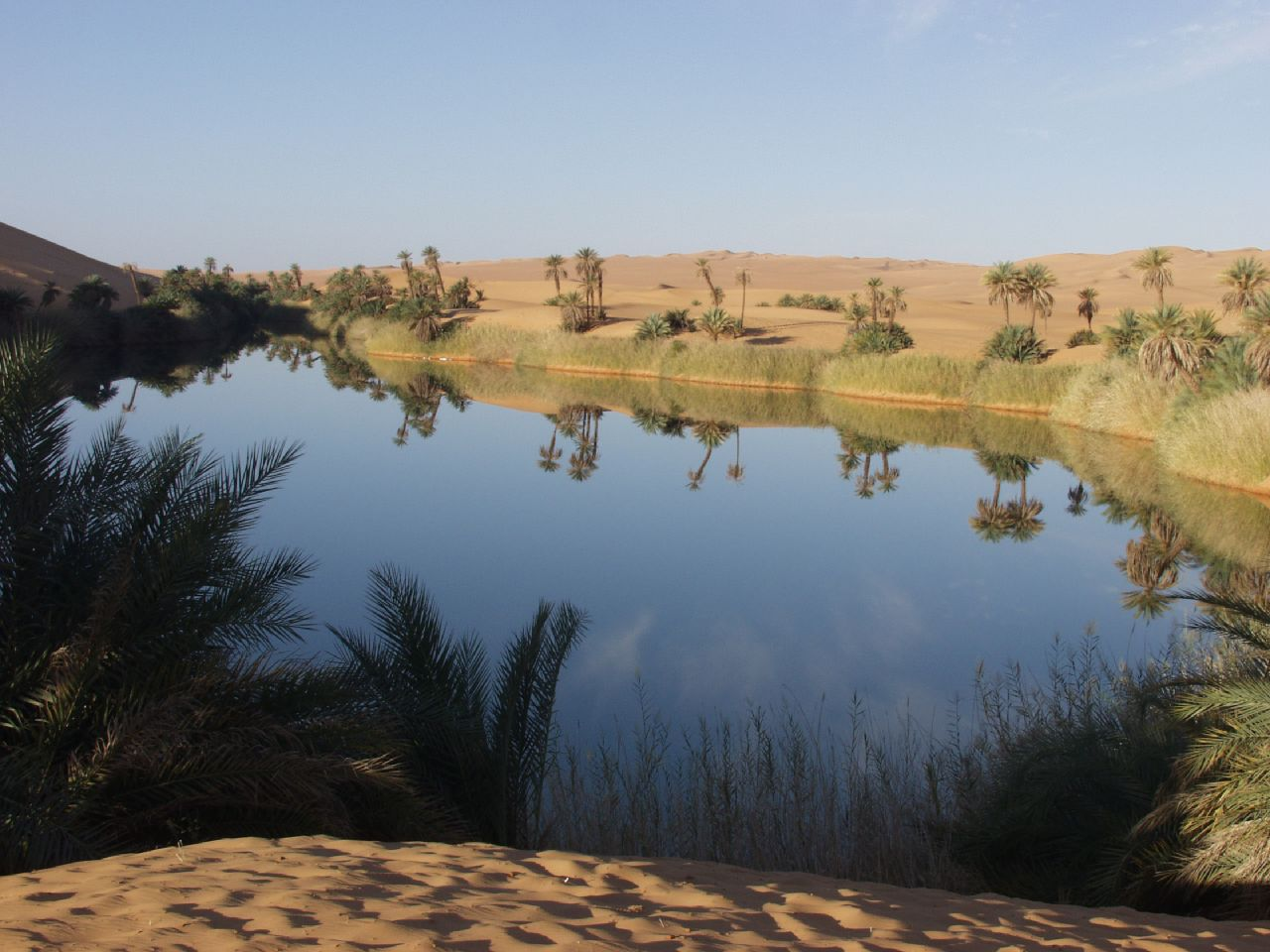
The Mandara Lakes in the Ubari desert

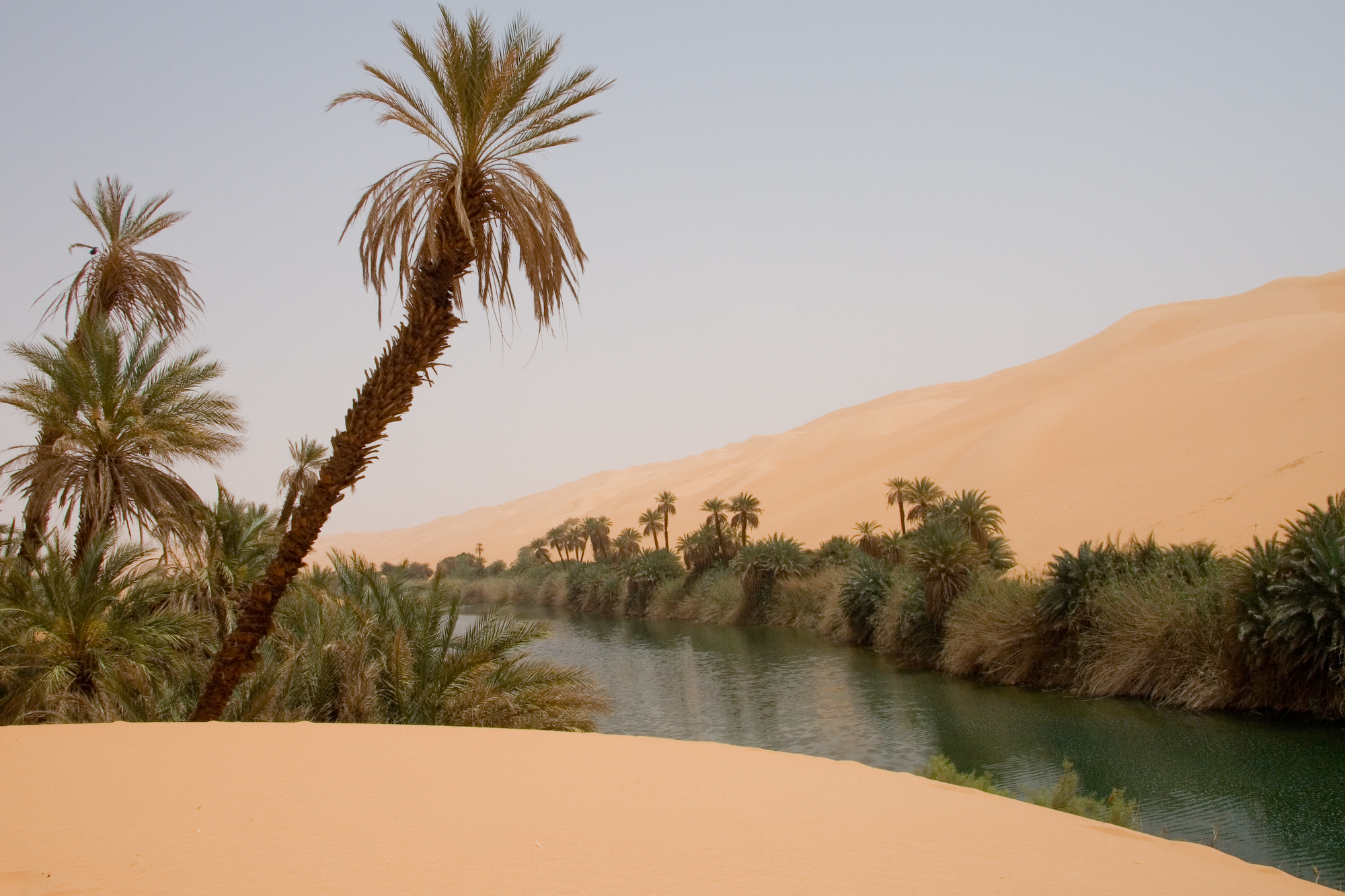
An Idehan Ubari oasis lake, with native grasses and date palms

== See also ==
- Geography of Libya
- List of ergs
