= Chergach =

Meteorite found in Mali

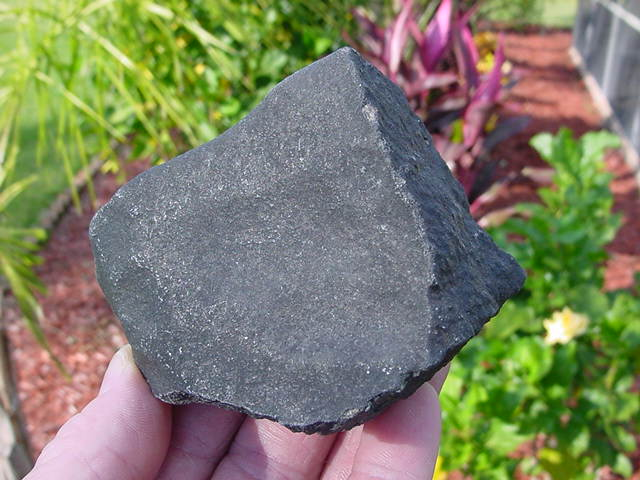
- Chergach, 601 grams
- Type: Chondrite
- Structural classification: impact melt breccia
- Class: Ordinary chondrite
- Group: H5
- Composition: Olivine Fa_{18.2}, pyroxene Fs_{15.5} Wo_{1.2}
- Shock stage: S3
- Weathering grade: W0
- Country: Mali
- Region: Timbuktu district
- Coordinates: 23°41′47″N 5°00′53″W
- Observed fall: Yes
- Fall date: 2 or 3 July 2007, daytime
- TKW: 100 kg
- Strewn field: Yes

Chergach is a meteorite found at southwest of El Mokhtar, Erg Chech, Timbuktu district, Mali. It fell on 2 or 3 July 2007, in daytime, and was composed of ordinary chondrite (H5).

== History ==
During 2007 fall and winter about 100 kilograms (220 lb) of meteorites were collected in the Erg Chech, north of Taoudenni. Desert nomads reported that during daytime in July 2007 several detonations were heard over a wide area, a smoke cloud was seen and several stones fell from the sky, however no fireball was reported. Ouled Bleila was the finder of the first meteorites, but he died in October 2007 in a car accident on his way back from the trip to the Chergach strewn field. According to the Tuareg people, the elliptical strewn field stretches for more than 20 kilometres (12 mi).

== See also ==
- Glossary of meteoritics
