= Erg Chech =

Coordinates: 24°35′N 2°35′W

Erg Chech عرق شاش
- Erg
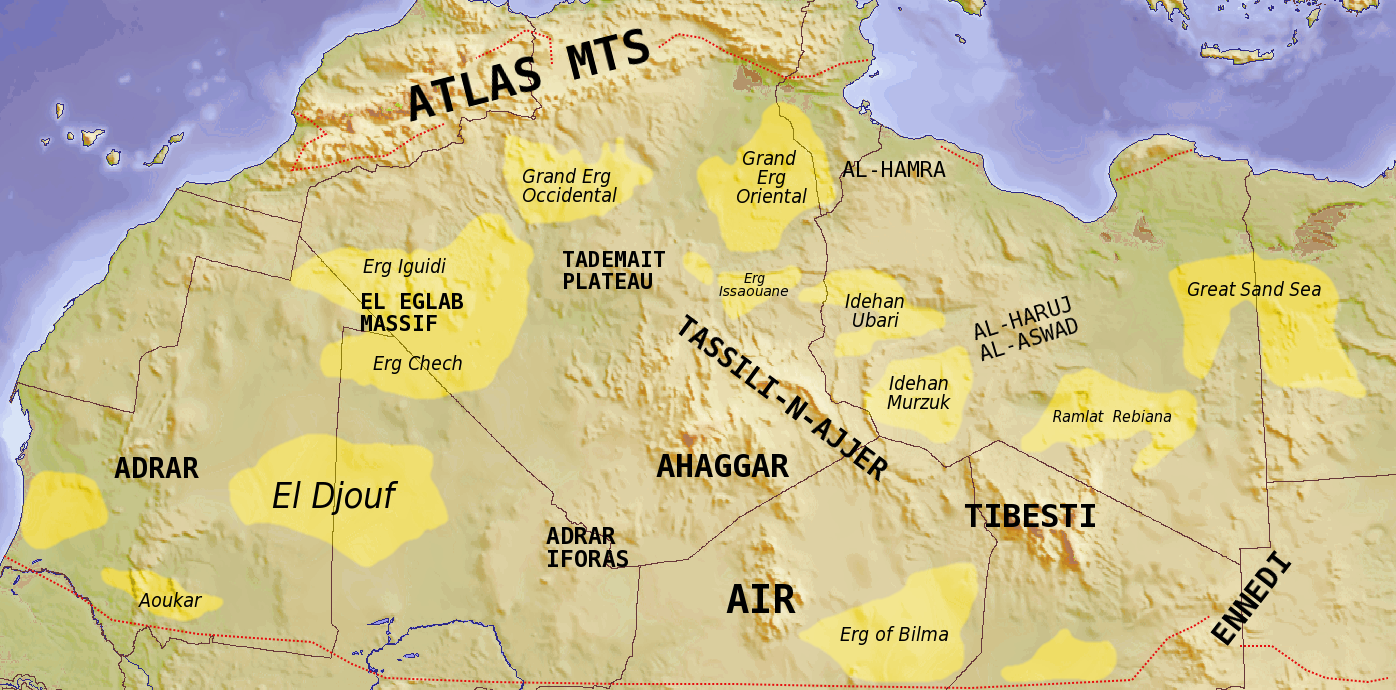
- Map of the Sahara showing the Erg Chech.
- Country: Algeria, Mauritania and Mali

Area
  - Total: 206.000 km^{2} (79.537 sq mi)
- Elevation: 307 m (1,007 ft)

The Erg Chech (Arabic: عرق شاش), is a large erg in the southwestern Algerian Sahara that extends across the border into northern Mali and eastern Mauritania. The Algerian part is located in the provinces of Adrar and Bordj Badji Mokhtar. It covers an area of 206,000 km², making it the third largest sand sea in the Sahara.

== Geography ==
It is an almost uninhabited part of the greater Sahara Desert, an inhospitable desert region with long, extremely hot summers and short, very warm winters. The Erg Chech is a vast sandy expanse including compound and complex linear and star dunes. The mean elevation of the Erg Chech is just above 300 m, slightly lower than the neighboring Erg Iguidi stretching to the north. The barren plain of the Tanezrouft is located to the southeast.

One of the localities of the commune of Akabli in Aoulef District, Adrar Province, Algeria, is named 'Erg Chech'.

== Meteorites ==
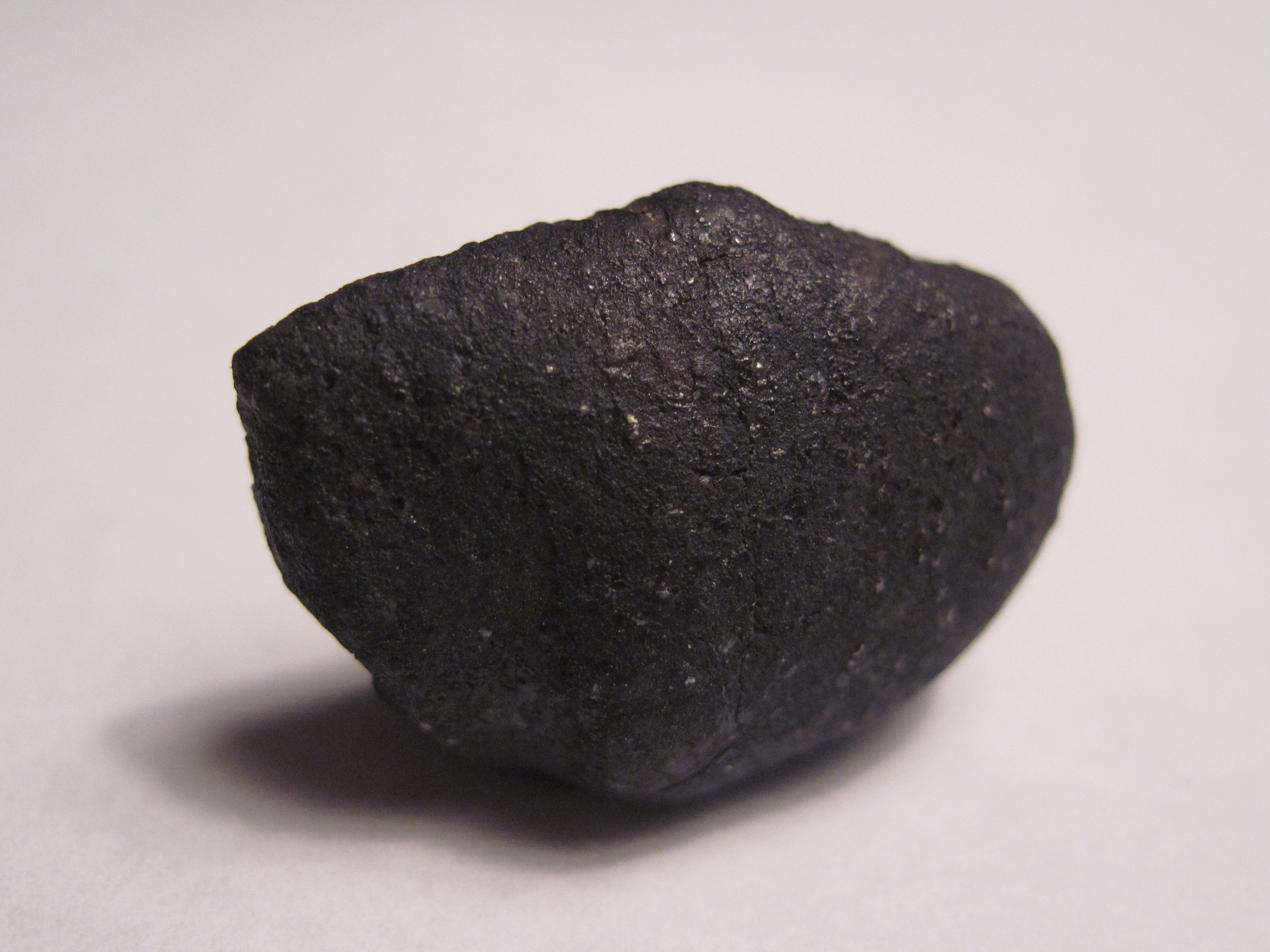
Chergach meteorite collected at Erg Chech; crusted example, 5.7 gram.

About 100 kilograms (220 lb) of meteorites were collected in the Chergach strewn field, located in the Erg Chech north of Taoudenni, during the fall and winter 2007. Desert nomads reported that during daytime in July 2007 several detonations were heard over a wide area, a smoke cloud was seen and several stones fell from the sky, however no fireball was reported. Ouled Bleila was the finder of the first meteorites, but he died in October 2007 in a car accident on his way back from the trip to the Chergach strewn field. According to the Tuareg people, the elliptical strewn field stretches for more than 20 kilometres (12 mi). In 2020 another meteorite was found. These rocks represent bits of meteorite Erg Chech 002, the oldest pieces of volcanic rock ever found, likely from an ancient protoplanet. These finds were used to confirm the aluminium-26 heterogeneity in the early solar nebula.

== See also ==
- Geography of Algeria
- List of ergs
