= Maine Mineral and Gem Museum =

Coordinates: 44.4077°N 70.7887°W

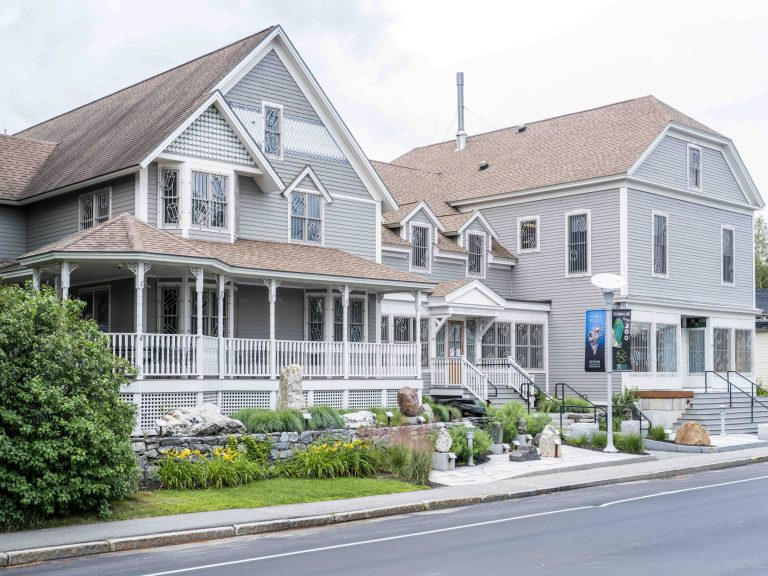
- Maine Mineral and Gem Museum as seen from Main Street
- Established: 2019
- Location: 99 Main St, Bethel, Maine
- Type: Geology museum
- Website: mainemineralmuseum.org

The Maine Mineral and Gem Museum (MMGM) is a geology museum located in Bethel, Maine. It displays a collection of rocks, minerals, and meteorites.

== History ==
The museum was formed using specimens, objects, gems and jewelry from several collections containing some of the finest Maine-mined material. Massachusetts-based philanthropists Lawrence Stifler and Mary McFadden started the collection for the Museum in the early 2000's with the Maine Mineral and Gem Museum opening in 2019.

== Collection and research ==
As of 2021, the museum holds 57,781 specimens, with 37,940 of those being minerals. Notable specimens contained by the museum are:

- The largest chunk of the asteroid 4 Vesta on Earth.
- The largest displays of lunar and Martian meteorites in the world, including the largest piece of the Moon known to exist on Earth.
- Petrica quadrifaria, a fossil tree and Maine's state fossil.
- The largest known Martian meteorite, Taoudenni 002.
- The oldest known volcanic rock, Erg Chech 002.

The 15,000sq ft museum has four galleries and nineteen permanent exhibits showcasing Maine minerals, as well as meteorites from the Moon and Mars. Additionally, the MMGM's active research laboratory supports scientific exploration of both minerals and meteorites. The MMGM houses approximately 6,000 extraterrestrial rocks (originating from the Moon, Mars, and Asteroid Belt) that are showcased in the Stifler Collection of Meteorites.

=== Tourmaline ===
Tourmaline is the state mineral of Maine. The museum holds many tourmaline specimens, including examples from "The Big Find" of 1972. "The Big Find" occurred at the Dunton Quarry on Plumbago Mountain in Newry where two metric tons of tourmaline were mined. In 2022, the museum opened the exhibition "The Big Find: The Legend Continues" which showcased stones from the 1972 find utilized by 12 jewelers from across the country.

== The William "Skip" Simmons Research Laboratory ==
Through collaboration with academic institutions and researchers from around the globe, MMGM's team of researchers have co-authored and presented over 100 scientific studies in the past decade and written over 500 peer-reviewed publications throughout their career.

== Maine Pegmatite Workshop ==
MMGM and the MP2 Research Team offer an annual opportunity to study granitic pegmatites at the Maine Pegmatite Workshop.

The Maine Pegmatite Workshop curriculum includes:

- Introduction to the nature of pegmatites
- Introductory concepts of igneous rock formation and mineral composition
- Overview of pegmatite mineralogy
- Pegmatites in relation to other igneous rocks
- The role of volatiles and fluxes in the crystallization of pegmatite melt
- The structural and textural variations within pegmatites
- The origin and classification of pegmatites
- Origin of Oxford Co., Maine Pegmatites - anatexis
- How to assess gem and mineralogical potential of pegmatites
- Mineral associations within Maine pegmatites
- "Pockets" In pegmatites, formation and mineralogy
- Information on pegmatite topics by guest speakers

== Robert F. Ritchie Lapidary Studio ==
In 2014, Maine Lapidary and MMGM Founding director and trustee emeritus, Robert F. Ritchie, MD, donated to the museum more than 800 stone spheres and the lapidary equipment that he used to cut and polish them. His sphere machine is a prominent part of the museums lapidary exhibit.

Currently, the Robert F. Ritchie Lapidary Studio at the Maine Mineral and Gem Museum is overseen by exhibit specialist and studio manager, Martin Roberts. Roberts is most often found in the studio, making spheres out of metamorphic, sedimentary, and igneous rock, and even meteorites.
