= Erg Chech 002 =

Ancient meteorite discovered in the Erg Chech region of Algeria

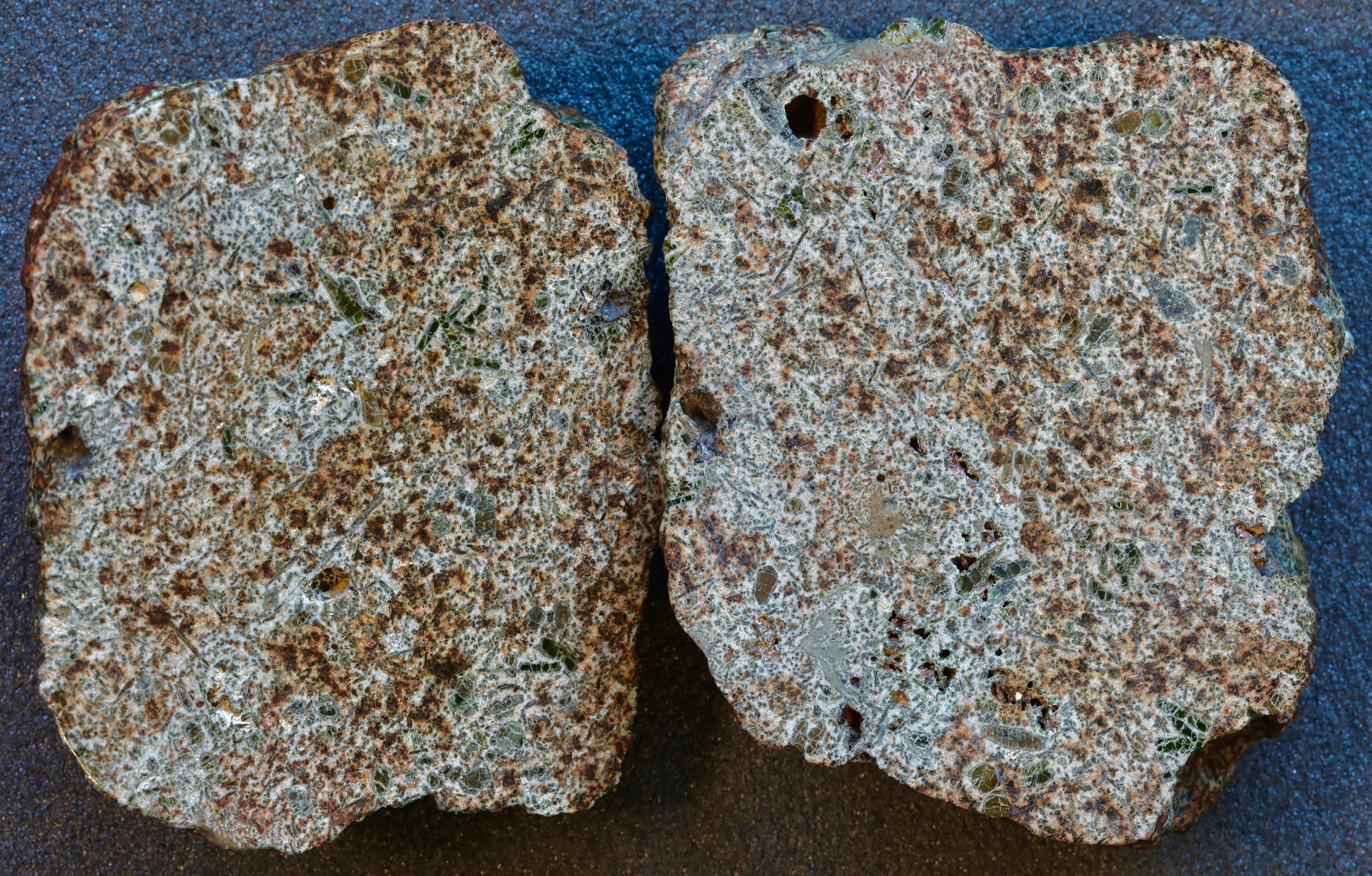
- Erg Chech 002 End Cut Faces
- Type: Ungrouped achondrite
- Shock stage: Low
- Weathering grade: Low
- Country: Algeria
- Coordinates: 26.032°N 1.611°W
- Observed fall: No
- Found date: May 2020
- TKW: 31.78
- Alternative names: EC 002
- Related media on Wikimedia Commons

Erg Chech 002 (EC 002) is an ancient andesite meteorite discovered in the Erg Chech region of the Sahara Desert in Algeria. The fall is believed to be fragments of a achondritic protoplanet that is over 4.566 billion years old, and is believed to be the oldest known volcanic rock on Earth. A specimen of Erg Chech 002 is held at the Maine Mineral and Gem Museum.
