= List of places on land with elevations below sea level =

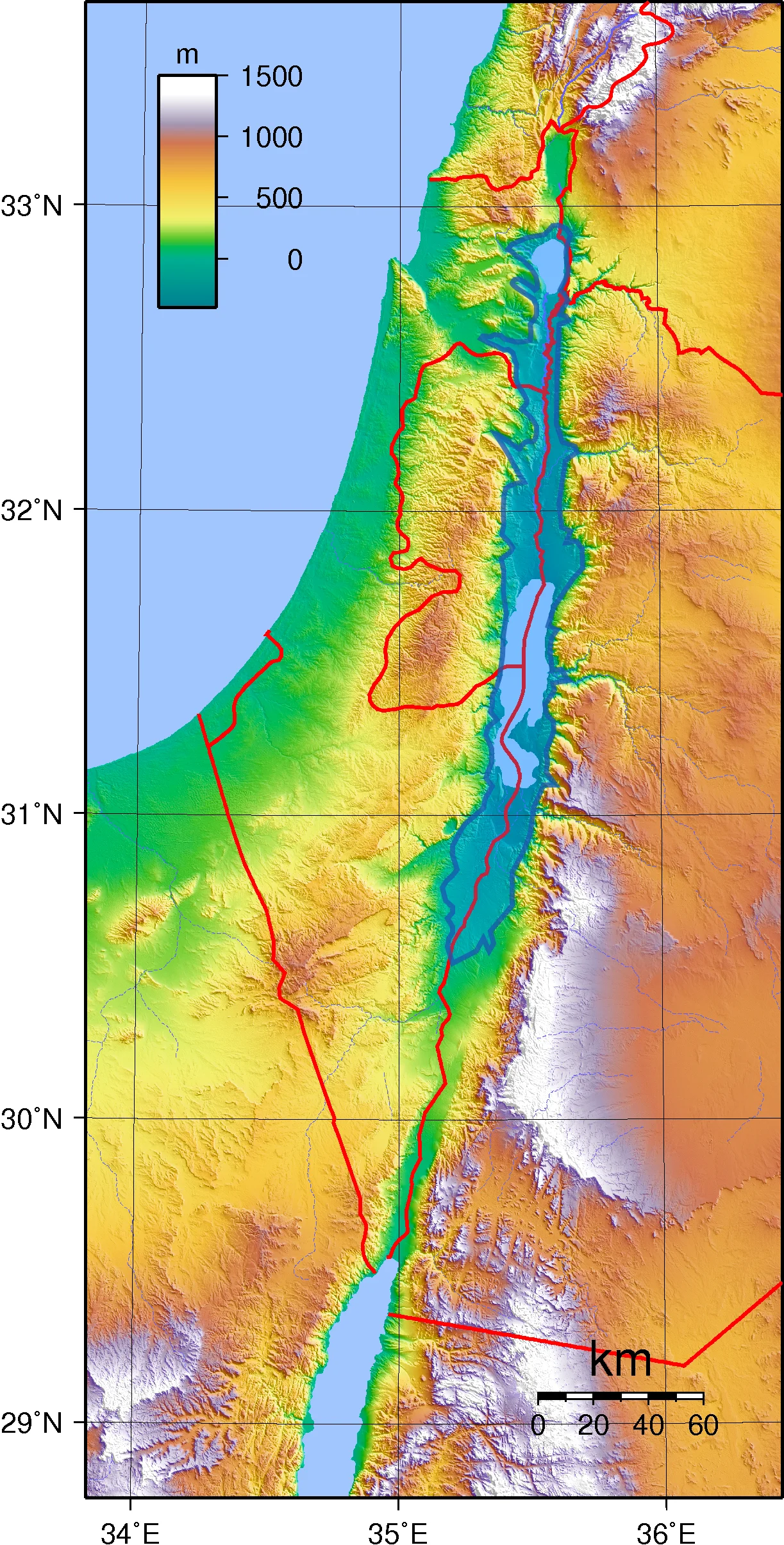
Dead Sea depression that is below sea level

This is a list of places on land below mean sea level.

Places artificially created such as tunnels, mines, basements, and dug holes, or places under water, or existing temporarily as a result of ebbing of sea tide etc., are not included. Places where seawater and rainwater is pumped away are included. Fully natural places below sea level require a dry climate; otherwise, rain would exceed evaporation and fill the area.

All figures are in meters below mean sea level (as locally defined), arranged by depth, lowest first:

== Africa ==
#	Name	Country	Depth	Notes / references
1	Lake Assal	Djibouti	−153 m (−502 ft)	in Afar Depression: lowest land in Africa
2	Qattara Depression	Egypt	−133 m (−436 ft)	
3	Danakil Depression	Ethiopia	−125 m (−410 ft)	in Afar Depression
4	Sebkha Tah	Morocco	−55 m (−180 ft)	in the Laâyoune-Boujdour-Sakia El Hamra region
5	Sabkhat Ghuzayyil	Libya	−47 m (−154 ft)	
6	Lake Moeris	Egypt	−43 m (−141 ft)	
7	Chott Melrhir	Algeria	−40 m (−131 ft)	
8	Shatt al Gharsah	Tunisia	−17 m (−56 ft)	
9	Sebkha de Ndrhamcha	Mauritania	−5 m (−16 ft)	

== Antarctica ==
#	Name	Country	Depth	Notes / references
1	canyon under Denman Glacier		bedrock is at −3,500 m (−11,500 ft)	This is the lowest natural point on land.
2	Byrd Glacier		−2,780 m (−9,121 ft)	
3	Deep Lake, Vestfold Hills		−50 m (−164 ft)	

== Asia ==
#	Name	Country	Depth	Notes / references
1	Dead Sea	Israel - Jordan – West Bank	−441.5 m (−1,448 ft)	lowest land in Asia and the world 31°30′N 35°30′E in Jordan valley, Israel – West Bank – Jordan
2	Allenby Bridge	Jordan – West Bank	−381 m (−1,250 ft)	lowest fixed water crossing in the world 31°52′27″N 35°32′27″E in Jordan valley, Israel – West Bank – Jordan
3	Neot HaKikar	Israel	−345 m (−1,132 ft)	Israeli town just south of the Dead Sea. 30.9330972°N 35.3766972°E in Jordan valley, Israel – West Bank – Jordan
4	Jericho	West Bank	−258 m (−846 ft)	lowest city in the world 31.85°N 35.46°E in Jordan valley, Israel – West Bank – Jordan
5	Sea of Galilee	Israel	−214 m (−702 ft)	32.80°N 35.60°E Jordan valley, Israel – West Bank – Jordan
6	Tiberias	Israel	−207 m (−679 ft)	32.7966°N 35.535717°E Jordan valley, Israel – West Bank – Jordan
7	Turfan Depression	China	−154 m (−505 ft)	
8	Karagiye, Caspian Depression	Kazakhstan	−138 m (−453 ft)	Caspian Basin
9	Bet She'an	Israel	−122 m (−400 ft)	32.50°N 35.50°E (between Tiberias and Jericho) in Jordan valley, Israel – West Bank – Jordan
10	Caspian Sea and its shores	Russia – Kazakhstan – Azerbaijan – Iran – Turkmenistan	−28 m (−92 ft)	Caspian Basin
11	Hachirōgata	Japan	−4 m (−13 ft)	
12	Kuttanad	India	−2 m (−7 ft)	

== Europe ==
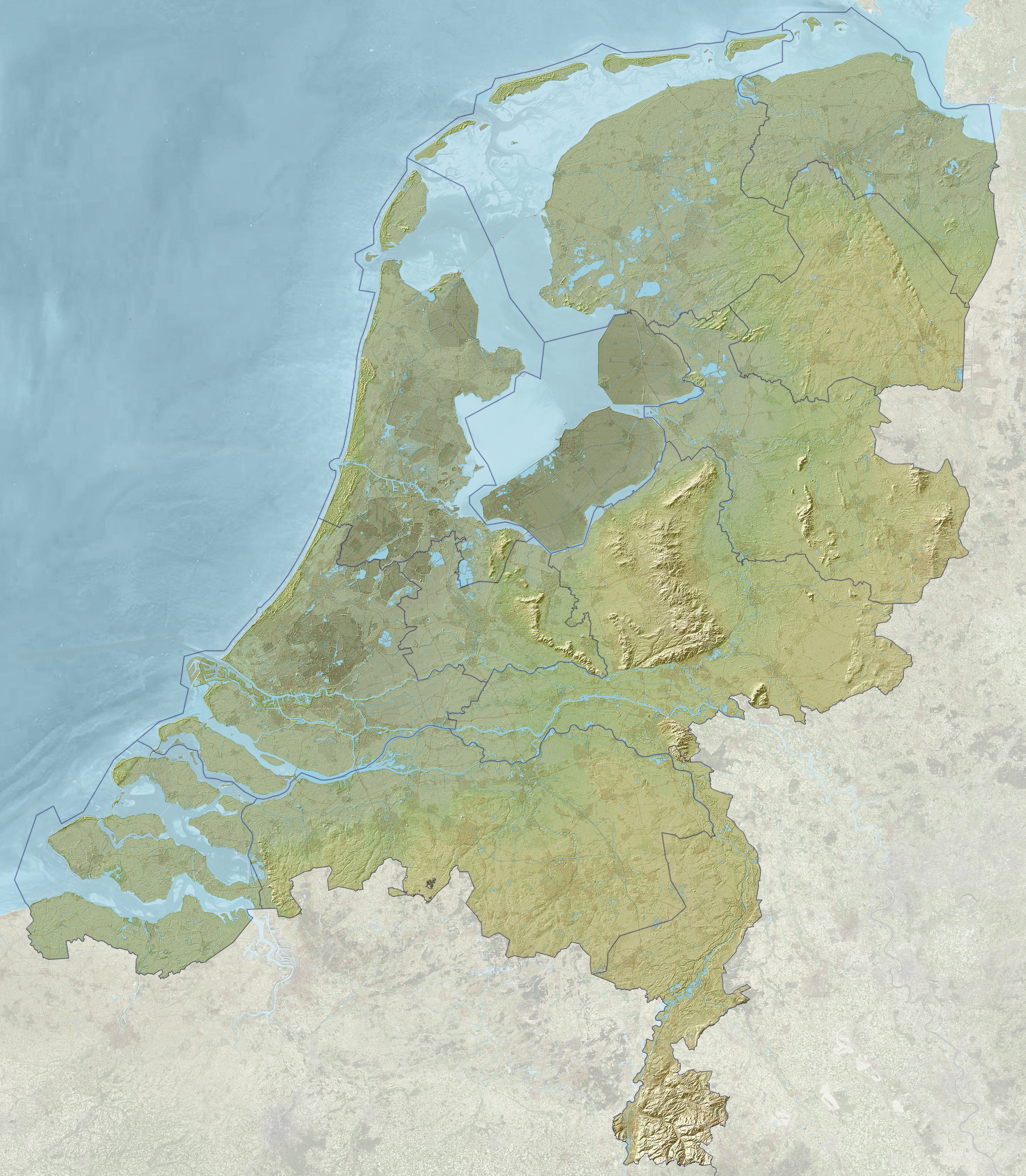
Areas of the Netherlands located above sea level (right) compared to dry land (left).

#	Name	Country	Depth	Notes / references
1=	Caspian Sea and its shores	Azerbaijan, Russia, and Kazakhstan	−28 m (−92 ft)	Caspian Depression
1=	Baku	Azerbaijan	−28 m (−92 ft)	lowest lying national capital in the world, Caspian Depression
3	Atyrau Airport	Kazakhstan	−22 m (−72 ft)	lowest international airport, Caspian Depression
4=	Lammefjord	Denmark	−7 m (−23 ft)	
4=	Zuidplaspolder	Netherlands	−7 m (−23 ft)	Netherlands coastal provinces (−1 to −7 m) (−3 to −23 ft)
6=	Haarlemmermeer	Netherlands	−5 m (−16 ft)	Netherlands coastal provinces (−1 to −7 m) (−3 to −23 ft)
6=	Kuialnyk Estuary	Ukraine	−5 m (−16 ft)	Odesa oblast
8=	Amsterdam Schiphol Airport	Netherlands	−4 m (−13 ft)	Netherlands coastal provinces (−1 to −7 m) (−3 to −23 ft)
8=	Wieringermeer	Netherlands	−4 m (−13 ft)	Netherlands coastal provinces (−1 to −7 m) (−3 to −23 ft)
8=	Flevoland	Netherlands	−4 m (−13 ft)	Netherlands coastal provinces (−1 to −7 m) (−3 to −23 ft)
8=	Neuendorf-Sachsenbande	Germany	−4 m (−13 ft)	
12	Le Contane, Jolanda di Savoia	Italy	−3.44 m (−11.3 ft)	
13=	parts of West Flanders	Belgium	−3 m (−10 ft)	
13=	North Slob, County Wexford	Ireland	−3 m (−10 ft)	
15	The Fens	United Kingdom	−2.75 m (−9 ft)	
16=	Étang de Lavalduc	France	−2 m (−7 ft)	
16=	Amsterdam	Netherlands	−2 m (−7 ft)	Netherlands coastal provinces (−1 to −7 m) (−3 to −23 ft)
16=	Kristianstad	Sweden	−2 m (−7 ft)	
16=	Żuławy Wiślane	Poland	−2 m (−7 ft)	Baltic delta of the Vistula River

== North America ==
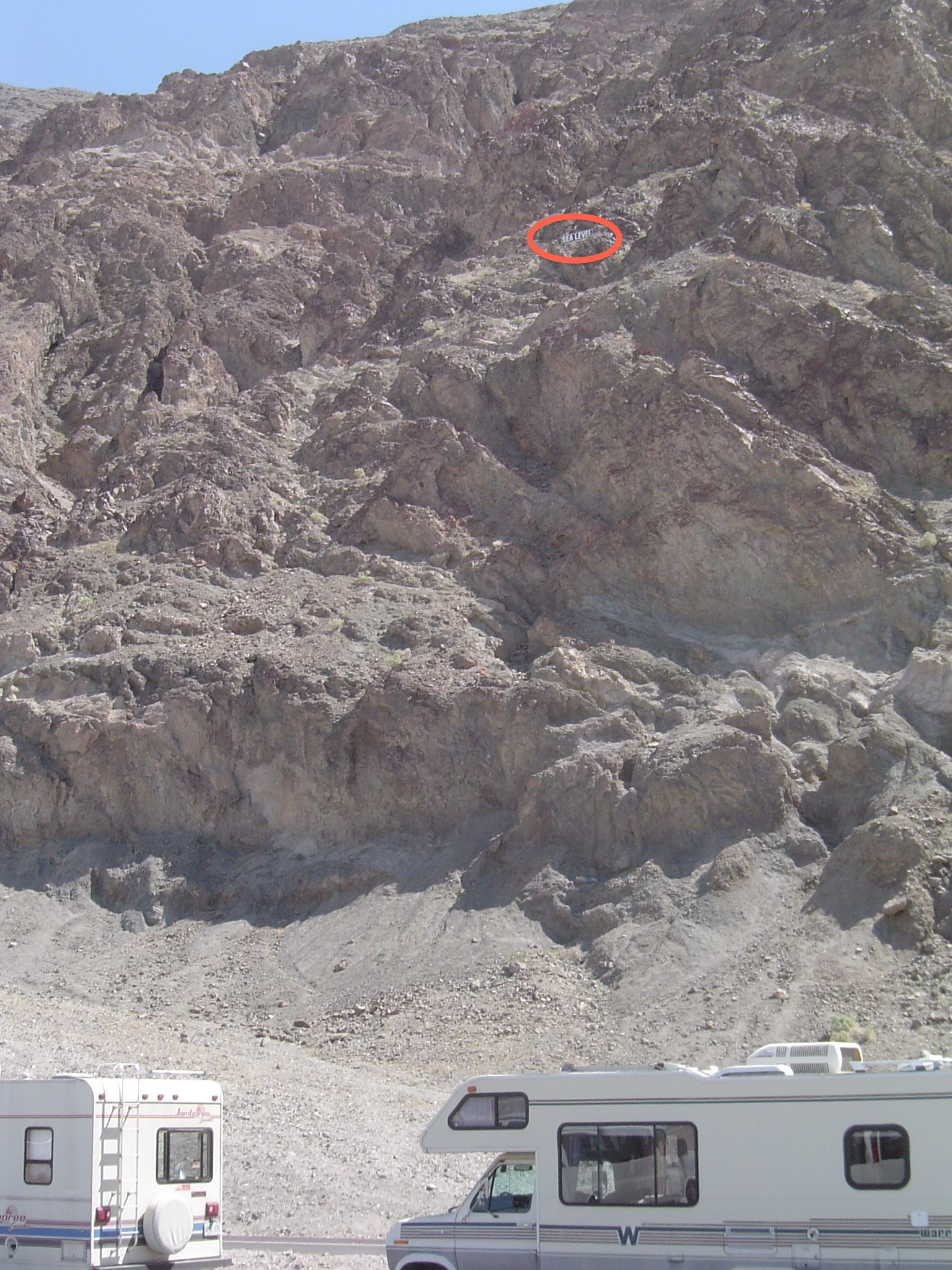
Sea level sign (2/3 of the way up the cliff face) above Badwater Basin, Death Valley National Park, USA

#	Name	Country	Depth	Notes / references
1	Badwater Basin, Death Valley, California	United States	−86 m (−282 ft)	lowest point in North America
2	Bombay Beach, California	United States	−69 m (−226 ft)	Salton Sink −66 m (−217 ft)
3	Salton Sea Beach, California	United States	−67 m (−220 ft)	Salton Sink −66 m (−217 ft)
4	Desert Shores, California	United States	−61 m (−200 ft)	Salton Sink −66 m (−217 ft)
5	Calipatria, California	United States	−56 m (−184 ft)	Salton Sink −66 m (−217 ft)
6	Westmorland, California	United States	−48 m (−157 ft)	Salton Sink −66 m (−217 ft)
7	Lake Enriquillo	Dominican Republic	−46 m (−151 ft)	lowest place on an island country.
8	Niland, California	United States	−43 m (−141 ft)	Salton Sink −66 m (−217 ft)
9	Salton City, California	United States	−38 m (−125 ft)	Salton Sink, −66 m (−217 ft)
10=	Brawley, California	United States	−37 m (−121 ft)	Salton Sink, −66 m (−217 ft)
10=	Thermal, California	United States	−37 m (−121 ft)	Salton Sink, −66 m (−217 ft)
12	Coachella, California	United States	−22 m (−72 ft)	Salton Sink, −66 m (−217 ft)
13	Imperial, California	United States	−18 m (−59 ft)	Salton Sink, −66 m (−217 ft)
14	Seeley, California	United States	−13 m (−43 ft)	Salton Sink, −66 m (−217 ft)
15	El Centro, California	United States	−12 m (−39 ft)	Salton Sink, −66 m (−217 ft)
16	Laguna Salada, Baja California	Mexico	−10 m (−33 ft)	
17	Indio, California	United States	−6 m (−20 ft)	Salton Sink, −66 m (−217 ft)
18	Heber, California	United States	−5 m (−16 ft)	Salton Sink, −66 m (−217 ft)
19	Brannan Island	United States	−4 m (−13 ft)	Sacramento–San Joaquin River Delta
20	Holtville, California	United States	−3 m (−10 ft)	Salton Sink, −66 m (−217 ft)
21	New Orleans, Louisiana	United States	−3 m (−10 ft)	
22	Nunavakanuk Lake, Alaska	United States	−1.2 m (−4 ft)	

== Oceania ==
#	Name	Country	Depth	Notes / references
1	Lake Eyre	Australia	−16 m (−52 ft)	lowest land in Australia
2	Lake Frome	Australia	−6 m (−20 ft)	
3	Taieri Plain	New Zealand	−2 m (−7 ft)	lowest land in New Zealand
4	Lake Macleod	Australia	−1 m (−3 ft)	Western Australia

== South America ==
#	Name	Country	Depth	Notes / references
1	Laguna del Carbón	Argentina	−105 m (−344 ft)	lowest land in the Americas
2	Laguna del Puesto, Santa Cruz province, Argentina	Argentina	−75 m (−246 ft)	
3	Bajo del Gualicho, Río Negro province	Argentina	−72 m (−236 ft)	
4	Salina Grande and Salina Chica, Valdés Peninsula, Chubut Province	Argentina	−42 m (−138 ft)	
5	Sechura Depression, Sechura Desert, Piura Region	Peru	−34 m (−112 ft)	
6	Lagunillas Municipality, Zulia	Venezuela	−12 m (−39 ft)	
7	Georgetown, Guyana	Guyana	−2 m (−7 ft)	

== Historic and ice-covered areas ==
The biggest dry land area below sea level that has been known to exist during the geological past, as measured by continuous volume of atmospheric air below sea level, was the dry bed of the Mediterranean Sea of the late Miocene period during the Messinian salinity crisis.

== See also ==
- Extreme points of Earth
- List of countries by lowest point
- List of submarine topographical features
