= Kusilvak Mountains =

Mountain range in Alaska, U.S.

- Kuzilvak Mountains
- Location within Alaska

Dimensions
- Length: 5 mi (8.0 km)

Naming
- Etymology: Russian, Yupʼik
- Native name: Kusilvak (Central Yupik)

Geography
- Country: United States
- State: Alaska
- Region: Yukon Delta
- District: Kusilvak Census Area
- Range coordinates: 62°1′N 164°33.5′W

The Kusilvak Mountains (Ingrill’er, Manialnguq in Yup'ik) is a mountain range of the Yukon Delta in Kusilvak Census Area, Alaska, to which the range gives its name. The mountains are adjacent to Nunavakanuk Lake. At their highest point they reach 2,241 ft (683 m) and span over 5 miles across.

The mountains were called Ingieguk on Russian maps, probably from the Yup'ik language name for mountain.
