= Nunavakanuk Lake =

Lake in the state of Alaska, United States

- Location within Alaska Location within North America
- Location: Yukon Delta, Kusilvak Census Area, Alaska
- Coordinates: 62°03′33″N 164°38′51″W
- Basin countries: United States
- Max. length: 9 mi (14 km)
- Surface elevation: −4 ft (−1.2 m) (below sea level)

Nunavakanuk Lake is a lake in the Yukon Delta of Kusilvak Census Area, Alaska, United States. The lake is 9 mi (14 km) long and is bordered to the south east by the Kusilvak Mountains. The lake's name is Eskimo in origin. At an elevation of −4 ft (−1.2 m) it is, or near, the lowest point in the state of Alaska.
