= Murzuq Desert =

Sandy desert in Libya

Idehan Murzuq أدهان مرزق
- Erg
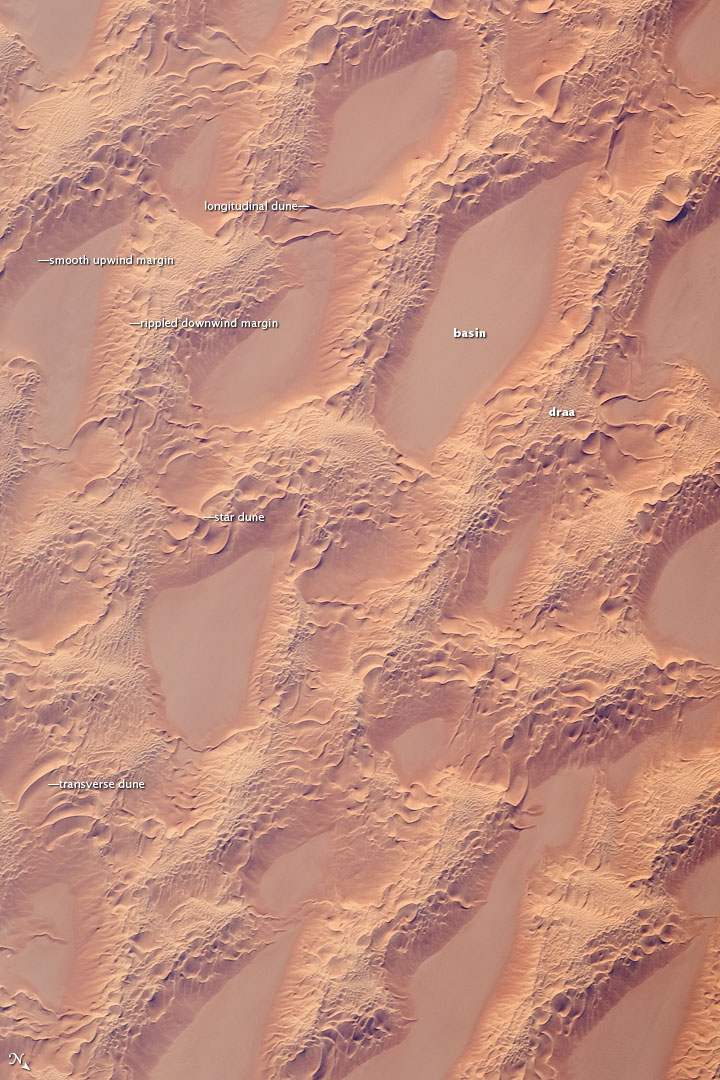
- Marzuq Sand Sea seen from ISS, 2008 (centered at 24.5°N 12°E). Detailed astronaut photograph, taken from low Earth orbit, showing classic large and small sand masses of the central Sahara where wind is a more powerful land-shaping agent than water.

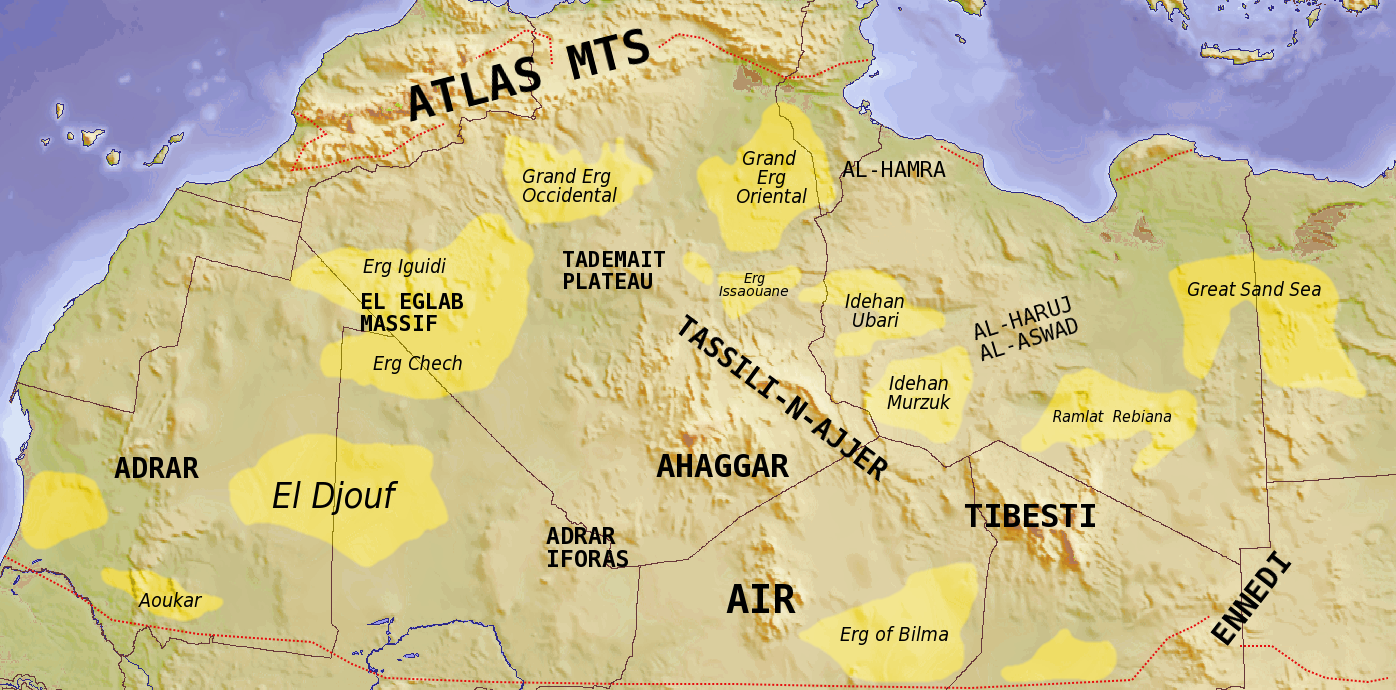
- Map of the topographic features of the Sahara
- Coordinates: 24°45′N 13°00′E
- Country: Libya

Area
  - Total: 58,000 km^{2} (22,000 sq mi)
- Elevation: 660 m (2,170 ft)

The Murzuq Desert, Idehan Murzuq, or Idhan Murzuq (also Murzaq, Murzuk, Marzuq and Murzak), is an erg in southwestern Libya with a surface of approximately 58,000 km^{2}. It is named after the town of Murzuk in the Fezzan region. Like the Idehan Ubari further north, the Idehan Murzuq is part of the greater Sahara Desert region. It is separated from the southern Sahara Desert by the Tibesti Mountains and the Tassili n'Ajjer.

== Dune pattern ==
The “Draa” dunes (from the Arabic for “arm”) are very large masses of sand in the western part of Libya's vast Murzuq Desert, and they appear in satellite images as a broad network of yellow-orange sand masses, with smooth-floored, almost sand-free basins between them. Geologists think that the draa of the Marzuq were probably formed by winds different from the prevailing north-northeast winds of today.

Numerous smaller dunes have developed on the backs of the draa. Three distinct dune types are visible in satellite images of the region:

- Longitudinal dunes, more or less parallel with the north winds.
- Transverse dunes, usually more curved and formed at right angles to the wind.
- Star dunes, in which several linear arms converge towards a single peak.

The upwind sides of the sand masses appear smoother than the downwind side. Wind is moving sand grains almost all the time. This means that the draa and the dunes are all moving as sand is added on the upwind side and blown off the downwind side. Small sand masses move much faster than large sand masses.

The draa are almost stationary, but the smaller dunes move relatively quickly across their backs. When the smaller dunes reach the downwind side of the draa, they are obliterated; their sand is blown across the basins as individual grains.

== Petroleum ==
Since oil exploration began in 1957, eleven oil fields, including NC186, have been discovered in the Murzuq Basin. Two of the fields are considered giants, and altogether there are more than 2 billion barrels of oil in reserves under the desert there.

== See also ==
- Geography of Libya
- List of ergs
