= Sabkhat Ghuzayyil =

Coordinates: 29°50′N 19°45′E

Location of Sabkhat Ghuzayyil

Sabkhat Ghuzayyil (Arabic: سبخة غزيل) is Libya's lowest point at 47 meters (154 feet) below sea level, and is just southeast of the Gulf of Sidra. It is located in the Al Wahat District of the Cyrenaica region in northeastern Libya.

The area is dry today but in the Holocene Wet Phase it was flooded.

Ajdabiya, some 150 kilometres (93 mi) south of Benghazi, is the main city in the area. It is located just northeast of the coastal areas below sea level. Brega is a smaller city located more westerly near the shore and is wedged between the sea and these low-lying lands.
