= Jadal =

Jadal جدل Jadel
- Village
- Location in Syria
- Coordinates: 32°58′19″N 36°21′52″E
- PAL: 277/264
- Country: Syria
- Governorate: Daraa
- District: Izraa
- Subdistrict: Izraa

Population (2004 census)
  - Total: 1,508

Jadal (Arabic: جدل) is a village in southern Syria, administratively part of the Izraa District in the Daraa Governorate. According to the Syria Central Bureau of Statistics (CBS), Jadal had a population of 1,508 in the 2004 census. Its inhabitants are predominantly Sunni Muslims.

== History ==
In 1596 Jadal appeared in the Ottoman tax registers as part of the nahiya of Bani Abdullah, in the Hauran Sanjak. It had an entirely Muslim population consisting of 31 households and 9 bachelors. The villagers paid a fixed tax rate of 40% on various agricultural products, including wheat (4,500 a.), barley (1350 a.), summer crops (1650 a.), goats and/or beehives (200 a.), in addition to "occasional revenues" (300 a.); a total of 8,000 akçe.

In 1838, Jedal was noted as a ruin, located "in the Lejah", west of Dama.

== Religious buildings ==
- Abu Bakr Al-Siddiq Mosque
- Mosque

== Bibliography ==
- Hütteroth, W.-D.; Abdulfattah, K. (1977). Historical Geography of Palestine, Transjordan and Southern Syria in the Late 16th Century. Erlanger Geographische Arbeiten, Sonderband 5. Erlangen, Germany: Vorstand der Fränkischen Geographischen Gesellschaft. ISBN 3-920405-41-2.
- Robinson, E.; Smith, E. (1841). Biblical Researches in Palestine, Mount Sinai and Arabia Petraea: A Journal of Travels in the year 1838. Vol. 3. Boston: Crocker & Brewster.
