= Erg (landform) =

Broad area of desert covered with wind-swept sand

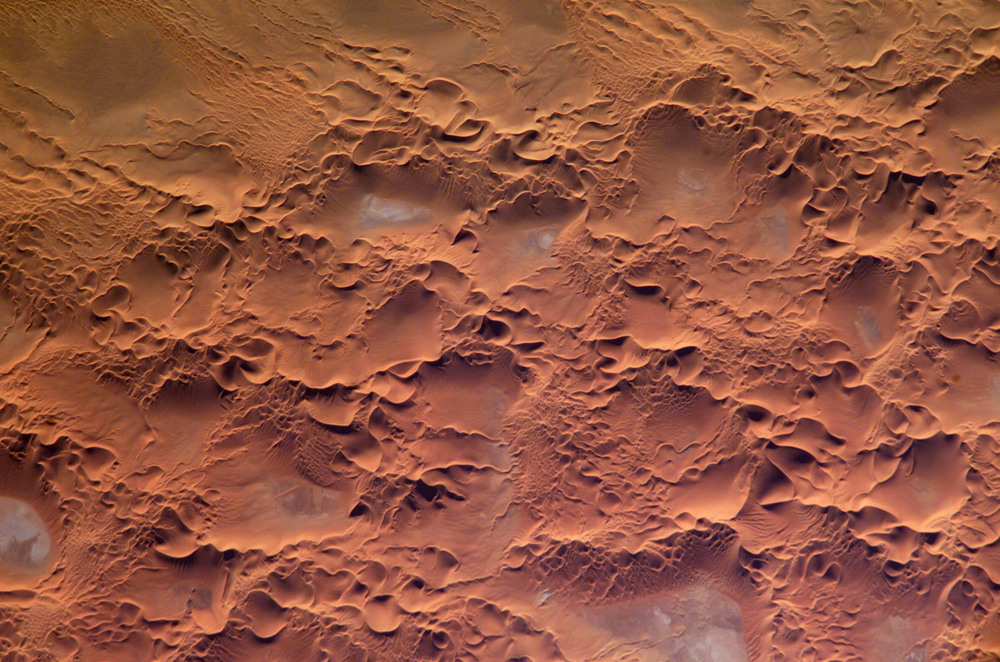
Issaouane Erg, Algeria

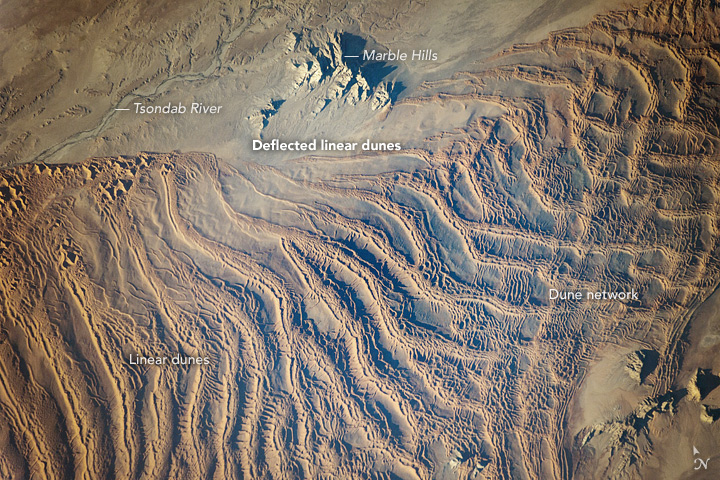
Linear Dunes, Namib Sand Sea

An erg (also sand sea or dune sea, or sand sheet if it lacks dunes) is a broad, flat area of desert covered with wind-swept sand with little or no vegetative cover. The word is derived from the Arabic word ʿirq (عرق), meaning 'dune field'. Strictly speaking, an erg is defined as a desert area that contains more than 125 km^{2} (48 sq mi) of aeolian or wind-blown sand and where sand covers more than 20% of the surface. Smaller areas are known as "dune fields". The largest hot desert in the world, the Sahara, covers 9 million square kilometres (3.5×10^{6} sq mi) and contains the largest amount of ergs, including many large ergs such as the Chech Erg and the Issaouane Erg in Algeria. Approximately 85% of all the Earth's mobile sand is found in ergs that are greater than 32,000 km^{2} (12,355 sq mi), the largest being the Rub' al Khali, the Empty Quarter of the Arabian Peninsula. Ergs are also found on other celestial bodies, such as Venus, Mars, and Saturn's moon Titan.

== Geography ==
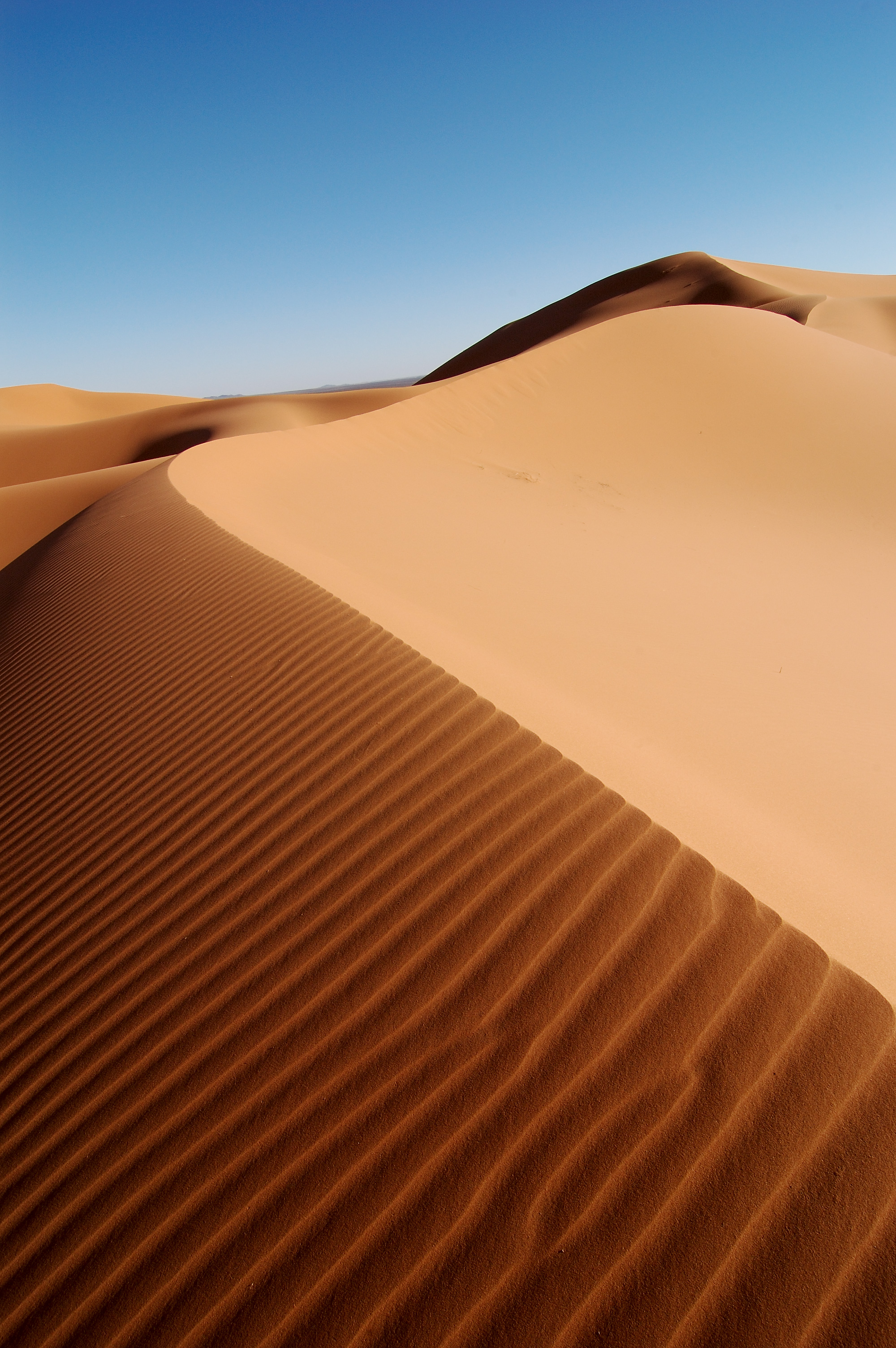
Erg Chebbi, Morocco

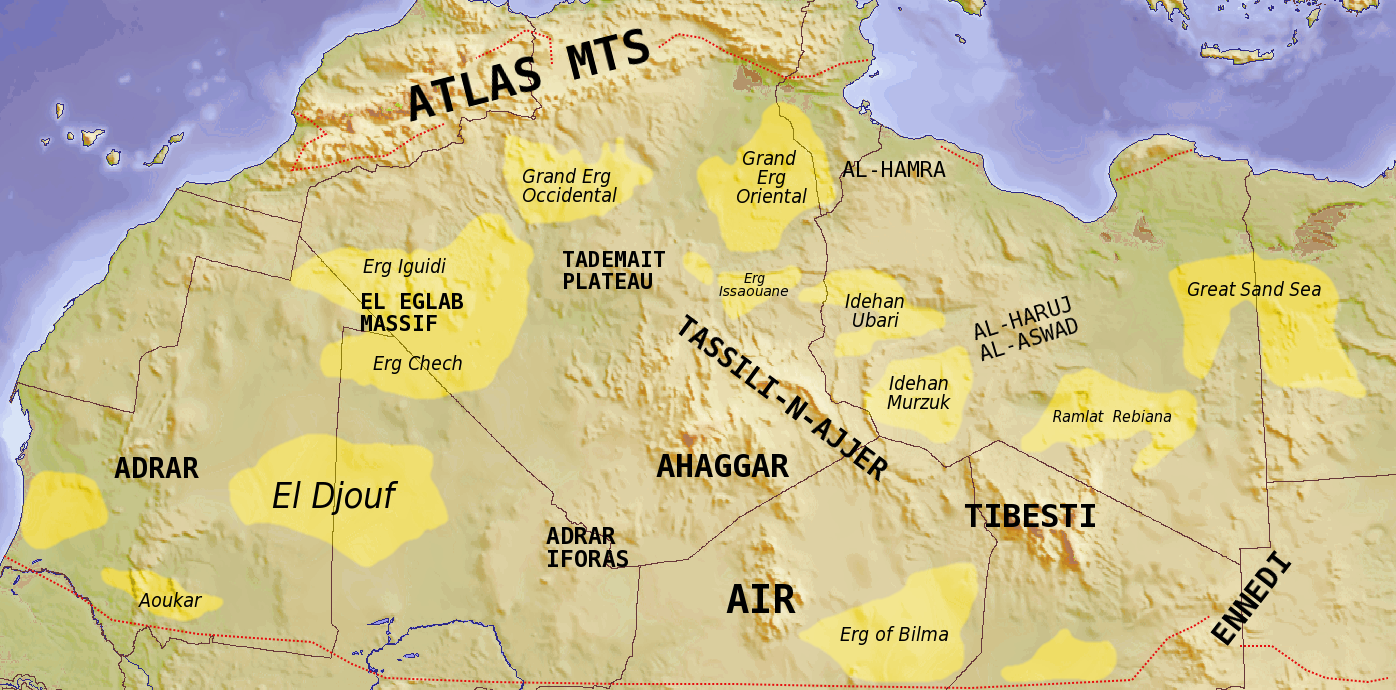
Major dune seas of the Sahara in yellow, Great Sand Sea. Red dashed line shows approximate limit of the Sahara.

Sand seas and dune fields generally occur in regions downwind of copious sources of dry, loose sand, such as dry riverbeds and deltas, floodplains, glacial outwash plains, dry lakes, and beaches. Ergs are concentrated in two broad belts between 20° to 40°N and 20° to 40°S latitudes, which include regions crossed by the dry, subsiding air of the trade winds. Active ergs are limited to regions that receive, on average, no more than 150 mm of annual precipitation. The largest are in northern and southern Africa, central and western Asia, and Central Australia.

In South America, ergs are limited by the Andes Mountains, but they do contain extremely large dunes in coastal Peru and northwestern Argentina. They are also found in several parts of the northeast coast of Brazil. The only active erg in North America is in the Gran Desierto de Altar that extends from the Sonoran Desert in the northwestern Mexican state of Sonora to the Yuma Desert of Arizona and the Algodones Dunes of southeastern California. An erg that has been fixed by vegetation forms the Nebraska Sandhills.

== Description ==
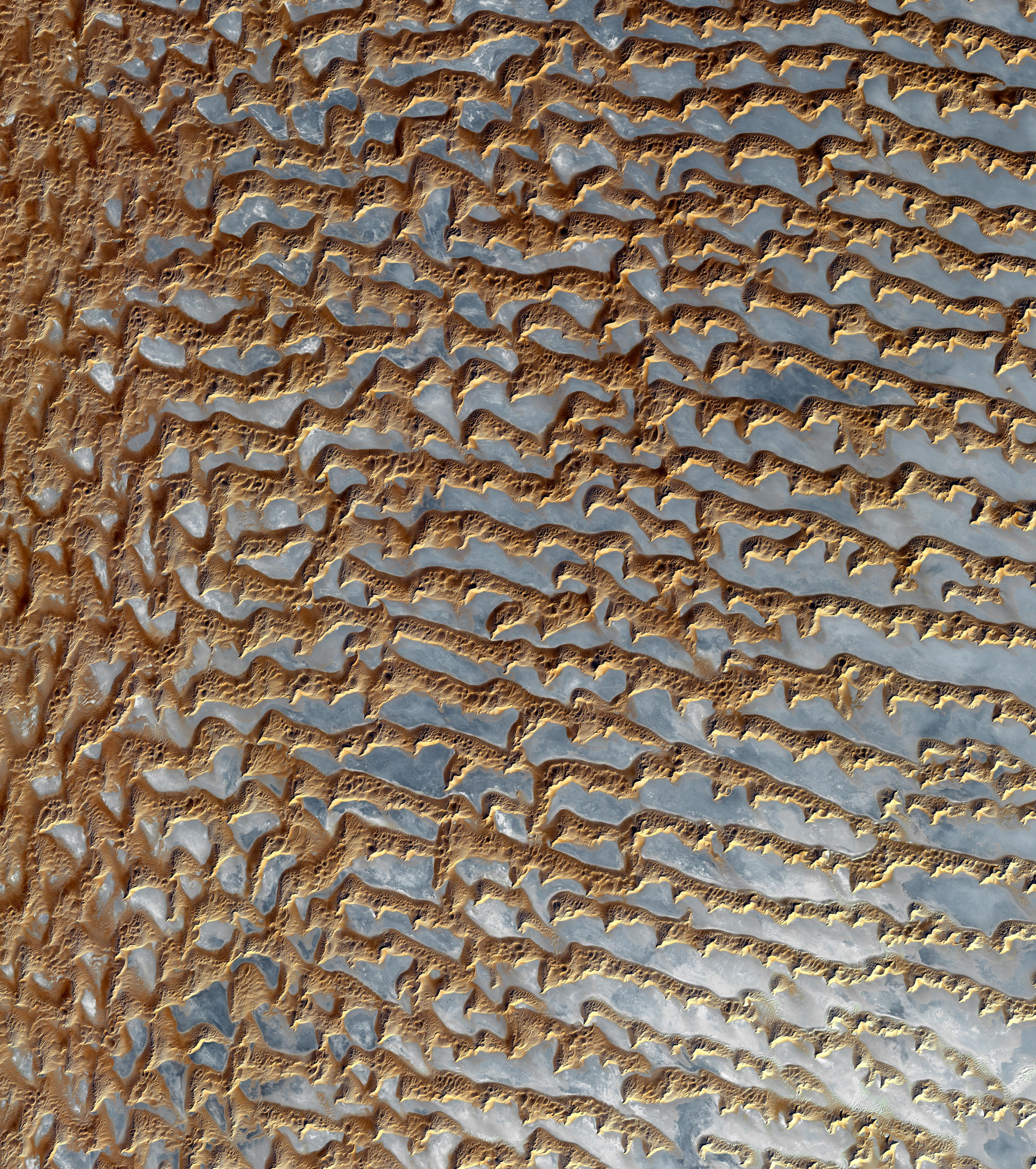
Satellite image of Rub' al Khali (Arabia's Empty Quarter), the world's largest erg with an area of more than 600,000 km^{2} (230,000 sq mi)

Almost all major ergs are located downwind from river beds in areas that are too dry to support extensive vegetative cover and are thus subject to long-continued wind erosion. Sand from these abundant sources migrates downwind and builds up into very large dunes where its movement is halted or slowed by topographic barriers to windflow or by convergence of windflow.

Entire ergs and dune fields tend to migrate downwind as far as hundreds of kilometers from their sources of sand. Such accumulation requires long periods of time. At least one million years is required to build ergs with very large dunes, such as those on the Arabian Peninsula, in North Africa, and in central Asia. Sand seas that have accumulated in subsiding structural and topographic basins, such as the Murzuk Sand Sea of Libya, may attain great thicknesses (more than 1000 m) but others, such as the ergs of linear dunes in the Simpson Desert and Great Sandy Desert of Australia, may be no thicker than the individual dunes superposed on the alluvial plain. Within sand seas in a given area, the dunes tend to be of a single type. For example, there are ergs or fields of linear dunes, of crescentic dunes, of star dunes, and of parabolic dunes, and these dune arrays tend to have consistent orientations and sizes.

By nature, ergs are very active. Smaller dunes form and migrate along the flanks of the larger dunes and sand ridges. Occasional precipitation fills basins formed by the dunes; as the water evaporates, salt deposits are left behind.

Individual dunes in ergs typically have widths, lengths, or both dimensions greater than 500 m (1,600 ft). Both the regional extent of their sand cover and the complexity and great size of their dunes distinguish ergs from dune fields. The depth of sand in ergs varies widely around the world, ranging from only a few centimeters deep in the Selima Sand Sheet of Southern Egypt, to approximately 1 m (3.3 ft) in the Simpson Desert, and 21–43 m (69–141 ft) in the Sahara. This is far shallower than ergs in prehistoric times were. Evidence in the geological record indicates that some Mesozoic and Paleozoic ergs reached a mean depth of several hundred meters.

== Extraterrestrial ergs ==
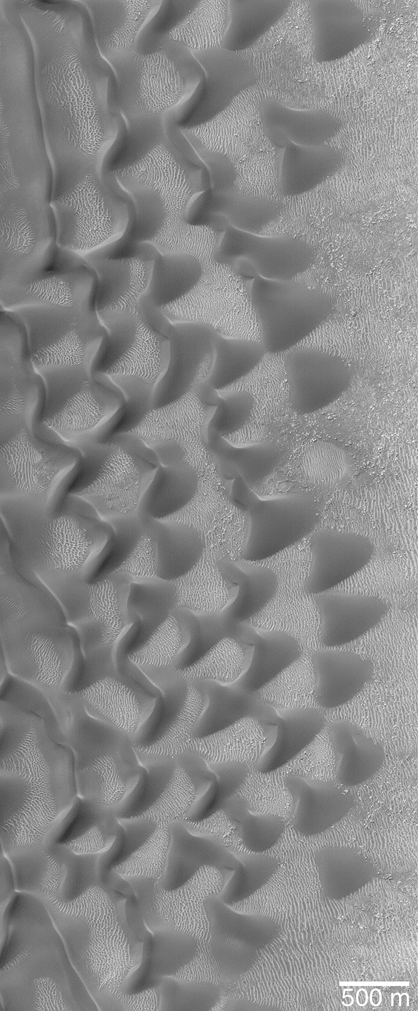
Barchan Dunes at the edge of the 35 × 65 km dark dune field in Proctor Crater, Mars (Mars Global Surveyor, 2000)

Ergs are a geological feature that can be found on planets where an atmosphere capable of significant wind erosion acts on the surface for a significant period of time, creating sand and allowing it to accumulate. There are at least three bodies in the Solar System, apart from Earth, are known to feature ergs on their surface: Venus, Mars and Titan.

=== Venus ===
Multiple ergs have been recognized by the Magellan probe on Venus: the Aglaonice dune field, which covers approximately 1,290 km^{2} (500 mi^{2}), and Al-Uzza Undae (Fortuna-Meshkenet) dune field (~17,120 km^{2} or 6,600 mi^{2}). These seem to be mostly transverse dune fields (with dune crests perpendicular to prevailing winds).

=== Mars ===
Mars shows very large ergs, especially next to the polar caps, where dunes can reach a considerable size. Ergs on Mars can exhibit strange shapes and patterns, due to complex interaction with the underlying surface and wind direction.

=== Titan ===
Radar images captured by the Cassini spacecraft as it flew by Titan in October 2005 show sand dunes at Titan's equator much like those in deserts of Earth. One erg was observed to be more than 930 miles (1,500 km) long. Dunes are a dominant landform on Titan. Approximately 15-20% of the surface is covered by ergs with an estimated total area of 12–18 million km^{2} making it the largest dune field coverage in the Solar System identified to date.

The sand dunes are believed to be formed by wind generated as a result of tidal forces from Saturn on Titan's atmosphere. The images are evidence that these dunes were built from winds that blow in one direction before switching to another and then back to the first direction and so on, causing the sand dunes to build up in long parallel lines. These tidal winds combined with Titan's west-to-east zonal winds create dunes aligned west-to-east nearly everywhere except close to mountains, which alter wind direction.

The sand on Titan might have formed when liquid methane rained and eroded the ice bedrock, possibly in the form of flash floods. Alternatively, the sand could also have come from organic solids produced by photochemical reactions in Titan's atmosphere.

== See also ==
- Aeolian processes – Processes due to wind activity
- Blowout (geomorphology) – Depressions in a sand dune ecosystem caused by the removal of sediments by wind
- Desert pavement – Type of desert earth surface
- Hamada – Desert landscape with mostly rock instead of sand
- List of ergs
- Médanos (geology)
- Yardang – Streamlined aeolian landform
