= Battle of Sabha (2019) =

2019 military offensive in southern Libya during the Second Libyan Civil War

Fezzan offensive
- Part of Second Libyan Civil War
- Situation in the region of Sebha
Date	January 16, 2019 – February 21, 2019 (36 days)
Location	Fezzan, southern Libya
Result	Libyan National Army victory

Belligerents
(Libya) House of Representatives: Libyan National Army; Khalid Ibn Walid Brigade; Rally of Forces for the Liberation of Sudan: Sudan Justice and Equality Movement; Sudan Liberation Army (al-Nour faction); Sudan Liberation Army (Minnawi faction)	(Libya) Government of National Accord: Supreme Council of Tuareg of Libya	Military Command Council for the Salvation of the Republic; Union of Resistance Forces; Union of Forces for Democracy and Development; Front for Change and Concord in Chad Movement for Justice and the Rehabilitation of Niger	Al-Qaeda in the Islamic Maghreb Islamic State in Libya

Commanders and leaders
(Libya) Khalifa Haftar	(Libya) Ali Kanna; Ibrahim Mohamad Kari X	(Chad) Mahamat Egrey Hally (Chad) Mahamat Nouri (Chad) Mohamad Hakimi	Abu Talha al-Libi †

Strength
Unknown	Unknown	2,000–11,000 men	Unknown

Casualties and losses
Unknown	Unknown	Unknown	Unknown

The Fezzan offensive took place during the Second Libyan Civil War. It began on January 16, 2019 with an offensive by the Libyan National Army aimed at taking control of southwestern Libya.

== Background ==
Southern Libya is an area marked by tense intercommunal relations. Fighting notably pitted the Tuareg and the Toubou against each other in Ubari from 2014 to 2015, and the Toubou against Arab tribes of the Oulad Souleymane in Sebha in 2017. Numerous cases of kidnapping for ransom, theft, and banditry have also been reported. Several rebel groups from Sudan, Chad, and Niger are established in southern Libya, particularly in the region of Sebha.

== Forces involved ==
Approximately five or six Chadian rebel groups use southern Libya as a rear base.

The largest of these groups is the Military Command Council for the Salvation of the Republic (CCMSR), followed by the Union of Resistance Forces (UFR), the Front for Change and Concord in Chad (FACT), and the Union of Forces for Democracy and Development (UFDD).

Altogether, these Chadian militias number several thousand fighters. Their strength was estimated at between 2,000 and 3,500 by the United Nations in early 2018, between 4,000 and 11,000 according to Alexandre Bish of the Global Initiative in early 2019, and as many as 18,000 according to the Government of National Accord in 2017. These groups are close to the Misrata brigades, particularly the Third Force of Libya. In 2017, they notably fought alongside them during the Gulf of Sidra Offensive and the Brak al-Shati Airbase raid. However, in spring 2017, weakened by counterattacks from the Libyan National Army (LNA), the Third Force withdrew from Fezzan. The Chadian groups then found themselves isolated, and some attempted to reach an accommodation with Field Marshal Khalifa Haftar. The FACT was thus granted permission to remain in Al Jufrah, on condition that it remained inactive there. Other formations survived by becoming involved in smuggling networks. Chad has also accused Qatar of financing Chadian rebels.

Sudanese rebels are grouped within the Rally of Forces for the Liberation of Sudan, founded in June 2017 and led by Taher Abu Bakr Hajar. This alliance includes three armed groups from Darfur: the Justice and Equality Movement (JEM) and the two factions of the Sudan Liberation Army, led respectively by Abdul Wahid al-Nur and Minni Minnawi. The Sudanese rebels, also supported by Chad, serve as mercenaries within Haftar's forces. The Rally of Forces for the Liberation of Sudan maintains a military base in Kufra, with around 2,000 armed fighters.

In the southwest, Tuareg territories are controlled by the Supreme Council of Tuareg of Libya, led by Moulay Ag Didi. The Tuareg control several oil wells and, from 2014 to 2015, clashed violently with the Toubou in the region of Ubari until the conclusion of a peace agreement brokered by Qatar. Since 2016, the Supreme Council of Tuareg has supported the Government of National Accord led by Fayez al-Sarraj.

The Libyan National Army of Field Marshal Khalifa Haftar maintains only a limited presence in Fezzan. It nevertheless received reinforcements from the Khalid Ibn Walid Brigade, led by a Toubou Salafist.

== Prelude ==
In February 2018, new fighting broke out in Sebha between the Arab tribe of the Oulad Souleymane and the Toubou. The former were close to the Government of National Accord led by Fayez al-Sarraj, while the latter were aligned with Khalifa Haftar. Subsequently, however, a large part of the Oulad Souleymane tribe rallied to Haftar.

In late May 2018, Libya, Chad, Niger, and Sudan signed a security cooperation agreement, which notably authorized a “right of pursuit.”

On October 13, 2018, aircraft of the Libyan National Army bombed a Chadian rebel group in Fezzan, near the oasis of Tmassa, killing rebel leader Mohamed Kheir. Sporadic fighting subsequently took place there. On October 16, Khalifa Haftar traveled to N'Djamena to meet Chadian President Idriss Déby. The two men agreed on the need for an operation in southern Libya, which would allow Idriss Déby to neutralize Chadian rebel groups and enable Haftar—already master of eastern Libya—to continue his campaign to expand control over the country.

Israel reportedly also responded favorably to a request by President Idriss Déby, made in November 2018 during the official visit of Benjamin Netanyahu, for assistance in securing Chad's northern border with Libya.

== Course of events ==
On January 16, 2019, the Libyan National Army (LNA) announced the launch of its offensive. The operation was carried out in coordination with the Chadian government and with the support of France, but it was viewed with concern by Algeria. The United States did not react. The offensive was launched from the Tamenhant Airbase, about 30 kilometers north of Sebha, the largest city in southern Libya. However, LNA units had already taken up positions around Sebha in the preceding days.

The stated objective of the LNA was to “ensure the security of the inhabitants of the southwest against terrorists, whether from ISIS or al-Qaeda, as well as criminal gangs.” It also claimed to seek to secure oil sites and the routes linking the south to the north, and to combat illegal immigration. In a statement, it called on local militias to evacuate the military sites they occupied.

In January, the LNA entered the city of Sebha with little difficulty, announcing its capture on January 19. Full control of the last parts of the city was not achieved until January 24.

On January 27, the LNA claimed to have seized the region of Ghadduwah, 80 kilometers south of Sebha. At dawn on February 1, Chadian rebels launched an attack on Ghadduwah. At least three LNA members were killed, including two officers.

Haftar's forces also surrounded the city of Murzuq, held by the Toubou. The operation was poorly received by local Toubou populations. The Toubou National Assembly condemned the offensive, and Libyan Toubou deputies suspended their participation in the House of Representatives in Tobruk. It also demanded explanations for statements by the LNA spokesperson accusing the tribe of “collusion with foreign forces.” Previously allied with Haftar, the Toubou appeared increasingly divided.

On January 18, 2019, the LNA announced that it had killed Abu Talha al-Libi, a senior leader of Al-Qaeda in the Islamic Maghreb. Abu Talha al-Libi was reportedly killed along with two other jihadists during an assault on two houses in the al-Qarda al-Shatti area, about 60 kilometers northeast of Sebha.

On February 3, 121 Nigerien Toubou rebels from the Movement for Justice and the Rehabilitation of Niger (MJRN), led by Mahamat Tinaymi, left Libya and surrendered to the Niger Armed Forces at Madama. A disarmament ceremony took place in Dirkou on February 11.

Based south of Murzuq, Chadian rebels of the Union of Resistance Forces also chose to leave southern Libya rather than fight Haftar's troops. After entering Chadian territory, their column was targeted by the French Air Force in the Ennedi desert between February 3 and 6. Around twenty vehicles were destroyed, and between 100 and 250 fighters surrendered to Chadian government forces.

On February 6, the LNA announced that it had seized the al-Sharara oil field near Ubari, the largest in the country, accounting for roughly one-third of Libya's oil production. The site had been closed since December 10 and was previously controlled by Tuareg militias. This seizure came only hours after the Government of National Accord announced the deployment of Petroleum Facilities Guards to al-Sharara. The Tuareg were divided, and several of their battalions joined the LNA.

The GNA remained without a response for several weeks. LNA forces were relatively well received by local populations, and according to Le Monde, most observers attributed Haftar's advances around Sebha to widespread local disillusionment with the Tripoli authorities. On February 6, the GNA Presidential Council issued a statement declaring that the fight against terrorism should be conducted through coordination among state security institutions rather than hasty operations. The same day, to counter Haftar's advance, Fayez al-Sarraj appointed the Tuareg Ali Kanna, a former Gaddafi-era officer, as commander of the “Southern Military Zone.” UN envoy Ghassan Salamé expressed concern about the “risk of escalation of violence.”

On February 13, according to the GNA, a U.S. airstrike was carried out near Ubari against al-Qaeda. The United States denied the following day that it had conducted any raid in Libya.

On the morning of February 20, the LNA entered the city of Murzuq and fought clashes with Chadian rebels. The LNA claimed control of the city later that day, while stating that combat units were still pursuing remaining Chadian opposition fighters. That evening, Ibrahim Mohamad Kari, a Toubou general and head of local security, was assassinated by what the GNA Interior Ministry described as an “outlaw armed group.”

On February 21, the LNA announced that it had “peacefully” taken control of the al-Fil oil field.

On May 4, the Islamic State attacked an LNA barracks in Sebha, killing nine people.

In late July 2019, while the LNA was engaged in the Battle of Tripoli (2019–2020), troops known as the “Southern Protection Force,” supported by the GNA and commanded by the Toubou leader Moussa Hassan al-Tabaoui, took control of Murzuq. The violence left dozens dead, and 2,150 civilians fled the city according to the United Nations. On August 5, the LNA claimed responsibility for an airstrike on Murzuq targeting “Chadian opposition fighters,” stating that Moussa Hassan al-Tabaoui had been wounded. Local officials and the GNA, however, accused the LNA of bombing civilians gathered in a government building, with reported casualties of at least 42 to 43 killed and 51 to 60 wounded. RFI reported uncertainty over the identity of the victims but noted that photographs from the hospital showed several bodies of young men in military fatigues. On August 11, the LNA re-entered the city, but soon clashed again with Chadian and Toubou fighters.

== Consequences ==
According to Jalel Harchaoui, a Libya specialist and researcher at the Clingendael Institute: “In one month, Haftar turned everything upside down; the political process was swept aside. The marshal intends to demonstrate, to Libyans as well as to his external backers, that he is delivering a flawless military performance and to continue his advance toward Tripoli by relying on his military legitimacy to attract defections. If he succeeds, Haftar could establish himself in Tripoli even before a national conference is held and before presidential and legislative elections are organized.”
