= Zawila =

Zwila زويلة Zuila, Zweila
- Town
- Location in Libya
- Coordinates: 26°10′00″N 15°07′00″E
- Country: Libya
- Region: Fezzan
- District: Murzuq

Population (2006)
  - Total: 4,018
- Time zone: UTC+2 (EET)

Zawila (also spelled Zuila, Zweila, Zwila, Zawilah, Zuwayla or Zuweila) is a village in southwestern Libya. During the Middle Ages, it was the capital of the Fezzan region.

When Uqba ibn Nafi passed through the area in 46 A.H. (666/67 CE), there was no city there. Zawila was settled probably in the early 8th century. It very quickly became the chief town of the region.

During its early history, it was dominated by the Hawwara Berbers, who mostly followed Ibadism. The Abbasids under Muhammad ibn al-Ash'ath al-Khuza'i captured the town in 762/63, and killed its Ibadi ruler, Abd Allah ibn Hayyan, but Ibadism persisted in Zuwila and the Fezzan in general. The town then became part of the Rustamid domains, albeit lying on the extreme eastern periphery of their realm. After the demise of the Rustamid dynasty at the hands of the Fatimids, in 918/19 Zawila became the capital of another independent Ibadi state, under the Berber Banu Khattab dynasty, which lasted until 1176/77.

The Kanem Empire started raiding the region in the 11th century, but the Banu Khattab held power until they were conquered by an Armenian Mamluk, Sharaf al-Din Qaraqush, who, coming from Egypt, conquered the region in the 1170s. The instability created by Qaraqush was exploited by the Kanem, who by the end of the 12th century had seized control of the Fezzan, establishing a new capital at Traghan, a few miles west of Zawila. During this period, Zawila enjoyed considerable prosperity from irrigated agriculture, its production of a leather variety named after the town, and its privileged position on the trans-Saharan trade networks. The city was cosmopolitan and rich, the site of one of the largest markets of slave captured from the Lake Chad basin. The Fatimids recruited soldiers from the area, whence the name of the Bab Zuwayla gate in Cairo. Alongside the Berbers, the town was inhabited by a free black settler population, likely of Toubou and Kanuri origin.

Kanemi rule seems to have been relatively intermittent after the conquest of Fezzan by the end of the 12th century. During this time period, Zawila became one of the many slave-colonies established by Kanem-Bornu throughout their lands and became known for the extraction of salt. Evebtually, the local Bornuan garrison began to exercise an increasing about of autonomy from Bornuan authority, ushering in a period of Semi-Independence as influence from the Hafsids began to grow. This period was brought to an abrupt end with the Ottoman conquest of Fezzan, but failure to integrate the economy of the Libyan countryside with the Mediterranean coast led to the disruption of the trans-Saharan trade routes which affected the town's prosperity and it lost its importance and rank of capital. When the Awlad Muhammad dynasty established Murzuk as their capital to the west of Zawila, the trade routes were diverted there, and Zawila fell into obscurity.
