= Ubari conflict =

Conflict in Libya

- Part of the Second Libyan Civil War
- Ubari conflict (Libya)
Date	September 2014 – February 2019
Location	Ubari and Sabha, Libya

Belligerents
Tuareg: Tuareg militias of Ghat; Awlad Suliman tribe (Arab); Supported by: (Libya) Government of National Accord	Tubu tribe: Toubou Front for the Salvation of Libya; Supported by: (Libya) Libyan National Army

Commanders and leaders
Edel Abu Baker Issa † (Tuareg Ghat leader); Ali Salah al-Husseini; Cpt. Ali Hussein (military operations commander); Otman Ziad; Bello Ahmed Hamadeen; Ahmed Allal (Brigade 30 commander) (Libya) Ali Kanna	Issa Abdel Majid Mansur (Toubou Front for Salvation of Libya leader); Ali Akri; Sharafeddine Barka Azaiy

Casualties and losses
- 400 dead and 600 injured

The Ubari conflict was a territorial dispute between the Tuareg and Tubu tribes over control of the town of Ubari, located near the oasis town of Sabha, Libya.

== Timeline ==
The conflict began in September 2014, when the Tuareg and Tubu fought for control of the city. The Arab Awlad Suliman tribe, an enemy of the Tubu, supported the Tuareg in what they viewed as combating Tubu expansionism. The Tuareg took positions on Tendi Mountain south of the city, while the Tubu took most of the Eastern side of town and adjacent foothills, cutting off the Eastern road leading to the Tuareg stronghold of Sabha, in Western Libya.

As the conflict progressed, both sides received reinforcements. The Tubu mobilised in Sabah and Qatrun, bringing hundreds of its tribesmen to Ubari. The Tuareg mobilized in Ghat, and Sabha, bringing several hundred of its fighters to Ubari.

On 23 November 2015, Qatar mediated a ceasefire between the Tuareg and Tubu; both groups agreed to withdraw from Ubari, and allowed for Arab tribesmen of the Hasawna tribe to enter the city to act as peacekeepers. In March 2017, representatives from the Tuareg, Tebu, and Awlad Suleiman signed a peace treaty in Rome as a replacement for a failed 2015 ceasefire brokered by Qatar.

In February 2019, both the Tuareg and Tubu temporarily united under the GNA and its Tuareg commander General Ali Kanna to defend themselves against Libyan National Army offensive in Fezzan.
