= Ghat District =

District of Libya

Coordinates: 25°20′N 11°00′E

Ghat غات
- District
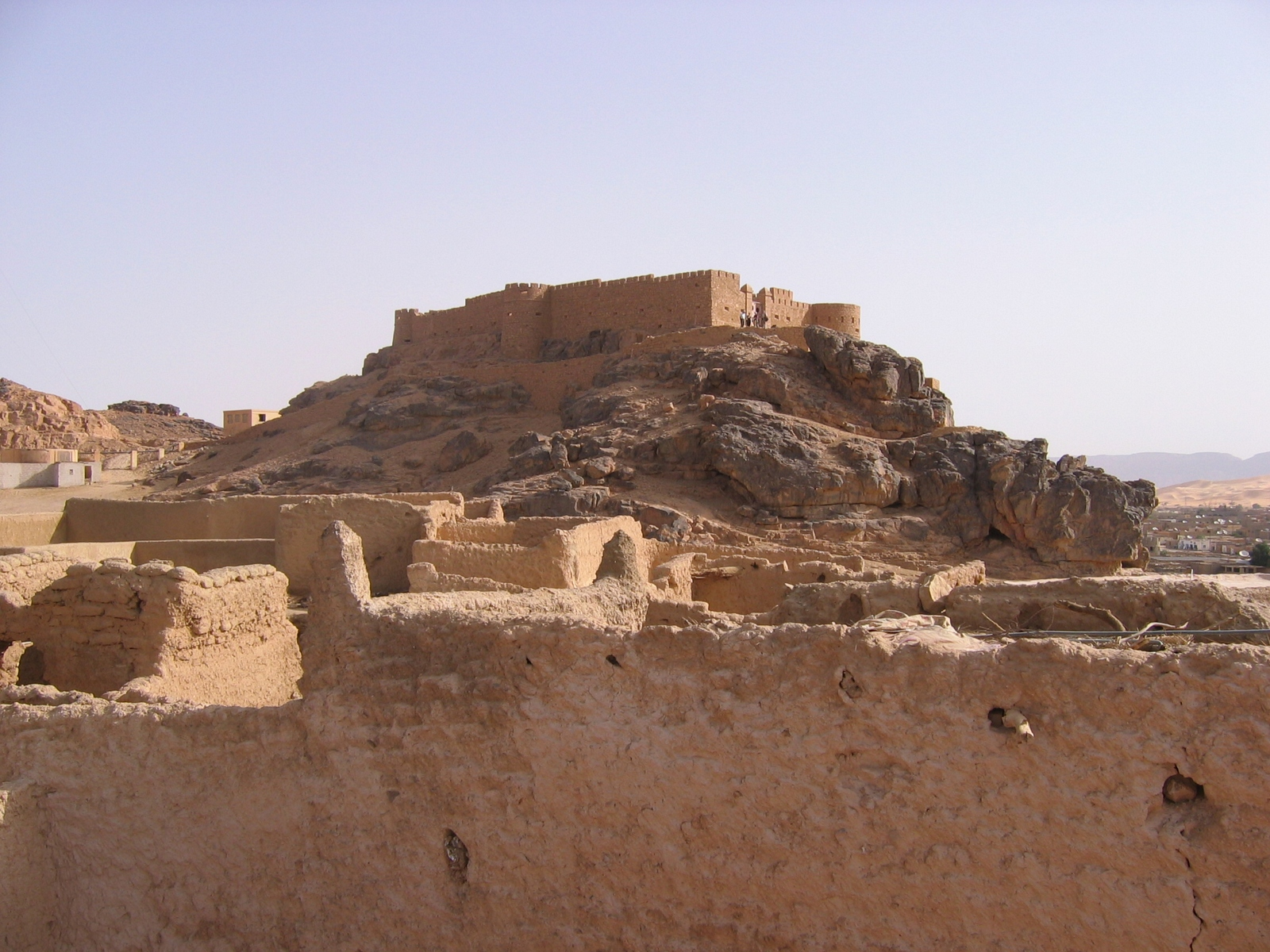

- Map of Libya with Ghat district highlighted
- Country: Libya
- Capital: Ghat

Area
  - Total: 72,700 km^{2} (28,100 sq mi)

Population (2012)
  - Total: 157,747
  - Density: 2.17/km^{2} (5.62/sq mi)
- License Plate Code: 32

Ghat (Berber: Ɣat; Arabic: غات Ġāt) is one of the districts of Libya. Its capital is Ghat. To the west, Ghat borders two provinces of Algeria: Djanet in the far southwest, and Illizi Province. Domestically, it borders Wadi Al Shatii in the north, Wadi Al Hayaa in the northeast and Murzuq in the east.

Per the census of 2012, the total population in the region was 157,747 with 150,353 Libyans. The average size of the household in the country was 6.9, while the average household size of non-Libyans was 3.7. There were a total of 22,713 households in the district, with 20,907 Libyan ones. The population density of the district was 1.86 persons per km^{2}. Per 2006 census, there were totally 8,218 economically active people in the district.

== Libyan Civil War ==
Since 2014, the district has been under the control of independent Tuareg and Tebu militias fighting each other for domination. This situation was reversed in 2019, when the militias united to fight against the offensive by the Libyan National Army.

== Geography ==
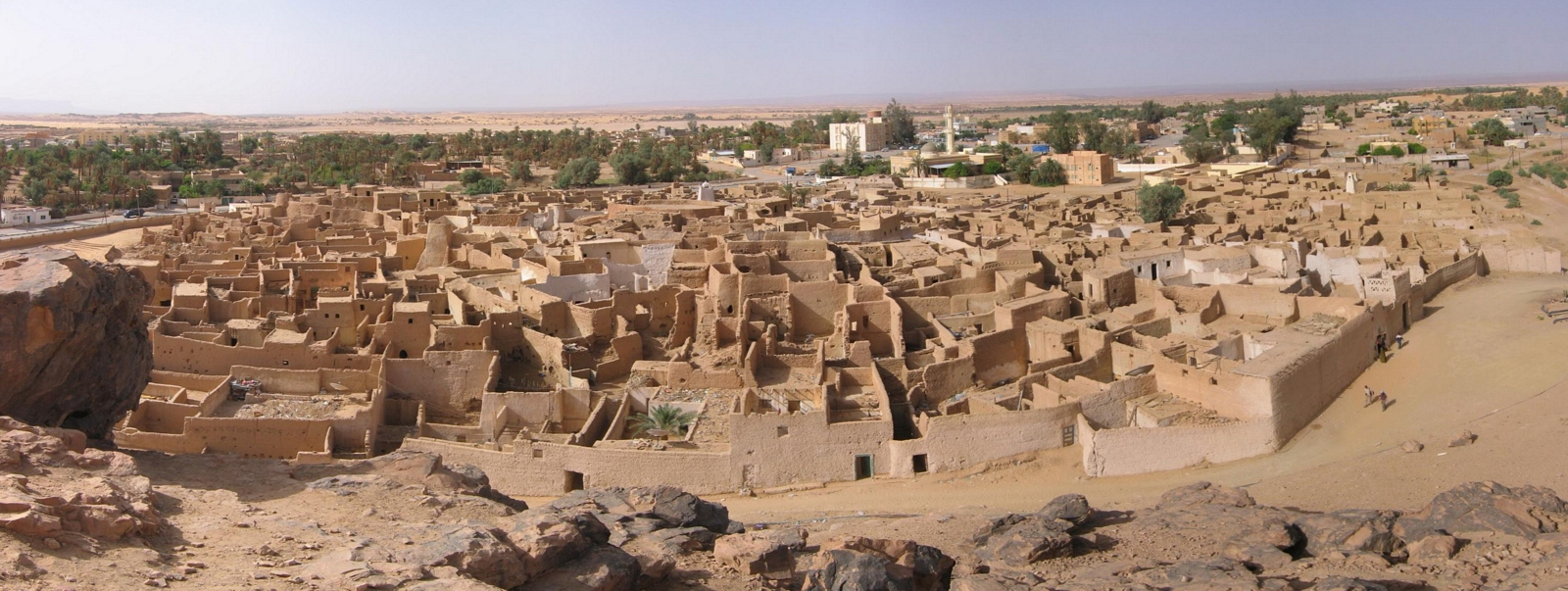
Overview of Ghat

Libya has mostly a flat undulating plain and occasional plateau, with an average elevation of around 423 m (1,388 ft). Around 91 per cent of the land is covered by desert, with only 8.8 per cent agricultural land (with only 1% arable lands) and 0.1 per cent of forests. The major resources are petroleum, gypsum and natural gas. Along the coastal regions, the climate is Mediterranean in coastal areas, while it is desert climate in all other parts. Dust storms lasting four to eight days is pretty common during Spring. Tripolitania is the northwest region, while it is Cyrenacia in the east and Fezzen in southwest. Fezzen is mostly full of deserts. The region receives an annual rainfall of 2.5 in (64 mm). There are no perennial rivers in the region, but the region is abundant with groundwater aquifers.

== Administration ==
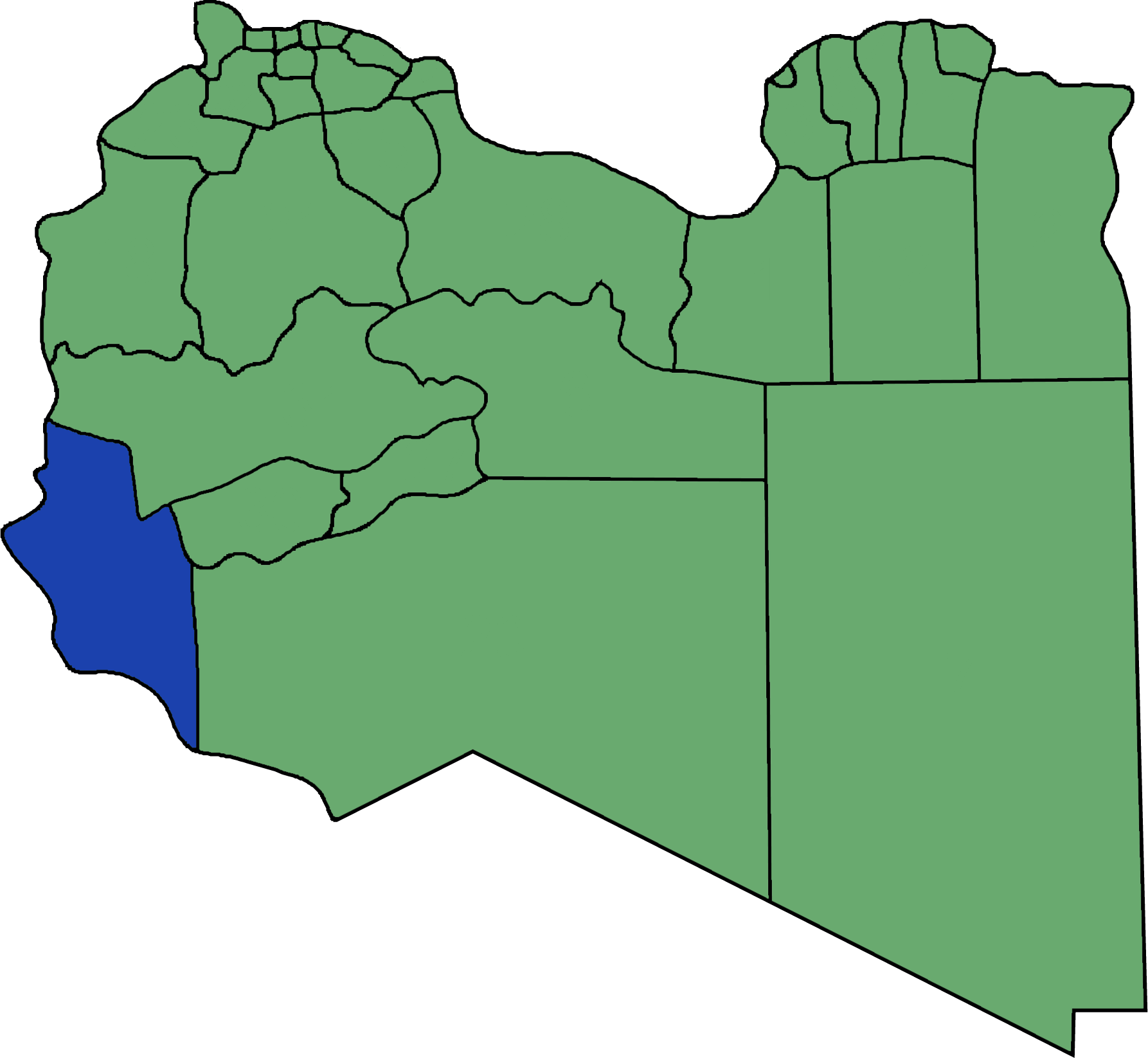
Ghat district from 2001 to 2007, under the 32-shabiyat system

Libya became independent in 1951 from the colonial empire and generally known for its oil rich resources. All the powers rested centrally with the President Gaddafi for 42 years till the 2011 armed rebellion which topple him. As per the constitution, Libya is the most decentralized Arab nation, but practically all powers are vested on central government on account of control over the oil revenues. Local governmental institutions manage the administration of education, industry, and communities. As a part of decentralization in 2012, the country is administratively split into 13 regions from the original 25 municipalities, which were further divided in 1,500 communes. Since 2015, the chief of the state is a Chairman of Presidential Council, while the Prime Minister is the head of the state. The House of Representatives is an elected body that is elected on universal suffrage and popular vote. As of 2016, there were 22 administrative divisions in the country in the form of districts.

== Demographics ==
Per the census of 2012, the total population in the region was 157,747 with 150,353 Libyans. making Ghat the least populated district. The average size of the household in the country was 6.9, while the average household size of non-Libyans being 3.7. There were totally 22,713 households in the district, with 20,907 Libyan ones. The population density of the district was 1.86 persons per km^{2}. Per 2006 census, there were totally 8,218 economically active people in the district. There were 4,700 government employees, 1,529 employers, 2,928 first level workers and 000 second level workers. There were 2,703 workers in state administration, 1,419 in agriculture, animal husbandry and forestry, 1,468 in agriculture & hunting, 1,229 in education, 566 in private enterprises, 670 in health & social work, 369 in production, 1,245 in technical work and 296 service workers. The total enrollment in schools was 8,094 and the number of people above secondary stage and less than graduation was 441. As per the report from World Health Organization (WHO), there were 1 communicable disease centres, 0 dental clinics, 1 general clinics, 0 in-patient clinics, 0 out-patient clinics, 2 pharmacies, 13 PHC centres, 0 polyclinics, 0 rural clinics and 0 specialized clinics.

== See also ==
- Acacus Sandstone
