= Tasawah =

Tasawah تساوة Tasawa
- Town
- Location in Libya
- Coordinates: 26°05′N 13°30′E
- Country: Libya
- Region: Fezzan
- Time zone: UTC+2
- License Plate Code: 24

Tasawah (Arabic: تساوة) village is an oasis in the Wadi Ataba region, located in the heart of the Libyan desert in southern Libya, at latitude 26°05'37" N and longitude 13°30'07" E. Was once known as "Little Garama." The village features ancient farms such as Al-Mungharis, Hamzouni, Al-Suniya, and Al-Nayida. It also houses old mosques, the oldest being the Mosque of Sidi Shu'aib. Among its notable historic mosques is the old Shahlia Mosque, built in 1930 AD, alongside the Sidi Abdul Hafiz Quranic School and other ancient mosques.

This village is bordered to the south by the border of Niger. To the west, there are agricultural projects such as Al-Maknusa, Burjough, Al-Feel Oilfield, and Wadi Mtekhandoosh, extending to the administrative boundary of Ghat. To the north, it is bordered by the Wadi Al-Hayat mountain range. Tasawah is located approximately 200 kilometers from Sebha, 50 kilometers from Murzuq, 120 kilometers from Ubari, and 950 kilometers from Tripoli. The population of the village is around 9,000 people.

== See also ==
- Fezzan
