= Funqul =

- Village
- Location in libya
- Coordinates: 25°55′58″N 14°15′58″E
- Country: Libya
- Region: Fezzan
- District: Murzuq
- Time zone: UTC+2 (EET)

Funqul is a village in the Murzuq Desert in Murzuq District in southwest Libya. It is located east of Murzuk and just to the northeast of Zizau. To the east is Traghan.
