= Banu Khattab =

- Capital: Zawila
- Religion: Islam (Ibadi)

Government
- Abdallah Ibn Khattab al-Hawwari
- Muhammed ibn al-Khattab
- History
  - Established: 918/919
  - Disestablished: c.1177
Preceded by	Succeeded by
Rustamid dynasty	Qaraqush's domain
- Today part of: Libya

Banu Khattab was a wealthy Ibadi dynasty of Hawwara origin that thrived off of the Trans-Saharan slave trade. It ruled over Zawila and the surrounding oases in the Fezzan region from 918/919 until 1172–1177 when it was sacked and conquered by the Armenian-Mamluk Qaraqush. The instability created by Qaraqush was exploited by the Kanem, who under the reign of Dunama Dabbalemi had seized control of the Fezzan, establishing a new capital at Traghan, a few miles west of Zawila.

They would later go on to rule the Fezzan again under the nominal control of the Hafsids in the 15th century.

== See also ==
- Awlad Muhammad
