= Mahmut Bey =

- Officer, Bey, Governor.

Ottoman Fezzan Province and Regency of Tripoli
- Reign: 1574 – 1583 Fezzan
- Predecessor: Sultan Bulālah Muḥammad
- Successor: Tripoli administration
- Reign: 1576 – 1583 Tripoli
- Successor: The Awlads
- Father: Hasan Pasha

Mahmut Bey (or Mahmud bey), also known as the grandson of Barbarossa, Mahmut Sancak-bey, Mami or Memmi Reis, Muhammad Pasha/bey 4 was an elderly Officer and Ottoman Bey, and a politico-religious in the 16th century, and was acknowledged as an extremely courageous and daring man, known for his expeditions into the Sahara and his push to both the north and south of Lake Chad. Mahmut was martyred while suppressing the local rebellion backed by Bornu in 1583. Fezzan, known as Fizan under Ottoman rule, ruled over Sebha, Reşade, Kawar, Asben, Fezzan, Sokna, Şâti, Hamites, Qatrun, Marzuk and Gat.

== Private life ==
Mahmut had married the only daughter of Turgut Pasha shortly after the Pasha's death in the siege of Malta. Mahmut was also the son of Hasan Pasha and the grandson of Barbarossa, he also had a brother named Mehmed. in 1561 Mahmut had joined the Turk-ish armada with a galley of his own.

== Battle of Lepanto 1571 ==
In the Battle of Lepanto that took place on 7 October 1571, Pertev Paşa was trying to help the admiral Müezzinzade Ali Paşa, who was under attack. His flagship was struck and sunk by a cannonball, where Pertev came to rescue Ali Paşa, but his vessel was destroyed by cannonfire. İn where he ultimately was plunged in the sea. He was rescued from the sea by Mahmut with a hook onto his ship and brought ashore at Preveza.

== Expedition into the Sahara ==
In 1574 with an army around 500 men, Mahmut, led from Tunis to conquer Fezzan and its Oases and then assumed his large occupation of the Southern Sahara, where the Ottomans invading into the Kawar oasis. Mahmut conquest various towns, cities, and fortresses of the Sahara. Where the local sultans were forced to recognize Ottoman suzerainty. Upon conquering sabha, the troops reaching the capital of the Awlad dynasty, he overthrew the government, expelled Sultan Bulālah Muḥammad from power, and assumed power as the ruler with the title of sancak of Fezzan, where he had transformation the lands he conquered into a (district governorship) sanjak beylik. And had subjected the Awlads into the tributary system. From there, he descended from Murzuq and were aided by the surviving tribe of Banu Khurman while on their journey too southern towards Bornu. The army reached the south of Lake Chad, but did not establish a permanent foothold around it, until later on. Mahmut, based in Murzuq Traveling further, with his Soldiers, into the Niger River, where the states of Black Muslims were located, brought them under his control. This was the deepest expeditions the made by the Ottoman an Ottoman governor. during his time, the Ottomans integrated the trans-Saharan slave trading system and expanded its influence into the sub-Saharan Africa.

== Expedition into Central Africa ==
Mahmut exerted great effort in transferring the Ottoman system to Central Africa so much so, It had caused considerable anxiety with the Bornu sultanate. With well trained 500 soldiers, he had followed a path with a distance of 1950 km^{2} where he reached into Lake Chad. From there, he Conquered the Chadic states who had authority over Fezzan, and other local tribes whom did not even dare to confront the Ottoman soldiers and expanded into portions of present-day Niger, and Chad, which were annexed to the Fezzan province. The Ottoman Empire Under the exploratory expedition by Mahmut. extended its influence on central region of the Sahel And Lake Chad, becoming a part of Ottoman sphere of influence. İn 1576 Ottoman domination under Mahmut had extended as far as the basin of Lake Chad. Mahmut had established his governorate to the borders of Kanem-Bornu, And rule into the 10th meridian in Central Africa. The aggressive occupation of the entirety of Chad, and the fall of Fezzan. had Idris Alooma fearing an Ottoman invasion ordered by Mahmut into his land. The Kanem–Bornu Empire sent three ambassadors to Istanbul in 1577 and offered their allegiance, where they were taken as an obedient vassal. This shocked Sultan Murad III and triggered a border crisis with Bornu, where they had asked Murad III to give back the fortresses taken by Mahmut. Murad III, refused to order Mahmut to give back the fortress to Bornu, Murad III had instead ordered Mahmut to keep peace with Bornu, but Protect the Frontiers, and keep its fortresses captured by him. Later on, firearms were sent from Tripoli by order of the Ottoman court, and the Bornu sultanate came under Ottoman nominal rule, as an Ottoman subject, and thus enjoyed the Ottoman System.

== Finance And Treasury ==
In 1576 minister of finance Ebi Bekr-zāde Meḥemmed Çelebi arrived together with Ebū Ṭayyib Beg who was a knowledgeable emir, they both arrived at the court of state. Where they talked about the negligence of Receb Pasha the Beylerbeyi of Tunis. They also had reported the effort Mahmut had committed on his tax-farming commitment in Fezzan, which had amounted to sixty thousand florins. Ebi Bekr-zāde Meḥemmed and Ebū Ṭayyib Beg had an discussion of combining both the position of the governor-general. Receb Pasha was dismissed and his position was given to Haydar Pasha, who was in the capital of Tripolitania, in exchange for twenty times one hundred thousand akçe. Tripoli was given to introduced too Mahmut as a sanjak, to rule them both, where he administered Tripoli with excellent skill.4 then in exchange for three times one hundred thousand akçe, had the sanjak of Fezzan, and Tripolitania annexed to the imperial crown lands so that all taxes that were collected from Fezzan would go to the Sultan's treasury in Istanbul.

== The Rebellion of Murzuq ==
Idris Alooma, wanting back the fortress, armed rebellious tribes to rebel against the Ottoman garrison in 1583, where Mahmut was martyred, while suppressing it. But Idris Alooma acted again, when the Ottoman garrison in Fezzan got slaughtered around 1585, leading to the Awlads return to power, under both the Bornu and Tripolitania.
