= Southern Libya offensive =

- Part of the Second Libyan Civil War
- Map showing the LNA's advances in southern Libya
| Date | January – April 2019 |
| Location | Southern Libya, with spillovers into Chad |
| Result | HoR/LNA victory |
| Territorial changes | Libyan National Army captures Sabha, and oilfields around Sabha |

Belligerents
| House of Representatives (HoR): Libyan National Army; JEM; SLM/A; United Arab Emirates (suspected); Co-belligerents: Chad; France | GNA/PC: Libyan Army; Allied forces: NSG loyalists Tuareg militias Toubou militias (Chad) Chadian rebels | Islamic State of Iraq and the Levant: Libyan Provinces; AQIM (HoR claim) |

Commanders and leaders
| Khalifa Haftar (LNA supreme commander); Abd al-Salim al-Hassi (LNA chief for the west); Hassan Matoug al-Zadma (128th Brigade); Khalifa al-Seghair al-Hasnawi (177th Brigade); Masoud al-Jadi (Deterrence Brigade) | Fayez al-Sarraj (Head of unity government); Ali Kanna (Southern military zone); Ahmed al-Ataybi (6th Infantry Unit); Muhammad Omar Hassan (166th Battalion); Ahmad Allal (30th Brigade); Ibrahim Muhammad Kari (executed) (Murzuq forces); Salah Badi (Al-Sumud Front) | (Islamic State) Al-Mahdi Rajab Dungo (Note: Al-Mahdi Rajab Dungo was allegedly killed in a LNA raid on 18 January 2019 northwest of Sabha, but this could not be independently verified.) (ISIL Minister of Defence for Libya) |

Units involved
| Libyan National Army: Tariq Ben Zeyad Battalion; 128th Brigade; 141st Brigade; 166th Infantry Brigade; 173rd Brigade; 177th Brigade; 160th Battalion; 181st Battalion; Subul al-Salam Battalion; Deterrence Brigade; United Arab Emirates Air Force (suspected) French Air Force (only against Chadian rebels) | Libyan Army: 6th Infantry Unit; 166th Battalion; 30th Brigade; Southern Protection Force; NSG loyalists: Al-Sumud Front; Chadian rebels: URF; CCMSR | Military of ISIL: Chadian militants (alleged) |

In late January 2019, the Libyan National Army (LNA) led by Marshal Khalifa Haftar launched an offensive to take control of the city of Sabha and the rest of southern Libya from the internationally recognised Government of National Accord (GNA) and local factions. Officially, the LNA announced that the reason for the operation was to remove terrorists, Chadian rebel groups, and secure the border, but it expanded Haftar's territorial control and acquired him oil fields near Sabha. It also restarted some interethnic conflicts as the LNA had allied with local Arab tribes, while the Tuareg and Toubou tribal militias were loyal to the GNA.

== Background ==
Southwestern Libya (Fezzan) has been destabilized since the First Libyan Civil War of 2011. Ethnic relations in the region were always tense, though not necessarily violent. Groups like the Tuareg and Toubou often suffered from discrimination, particularly under the rule of Muammar Gaddafi whose policy of divide and rule bolstered Arab supremacists in southern Libya. Upon the collapse of Gaddafi's regime in 2011, the marginalized ethnic groups took up arms to gain political rights, while Arab supremacists wanted to expulse them as perceived foreigners. Chadian and Sudanese rebels took advantage of this chaos, making southern Libya their safe haven and fighting for the highest bidder. As result, various infighting tribal militias, native insurgent groups, and foreign groups assumed control of the region. Many armed factions declared their loyalty to the United Nations-backed GNA government and the Presidential Council of Tripoli.

In 2014, a new full-scale civil war broke out between several Libyan factions, and Khalifa Haftar's Libyan National Army (LNA) quickly became one of the most powerful armed forces in the country. Similar to its rivals, the LNA is not fully unified, but consists of autonomous militias who acknowledged the authority of the Libyan House of Representatives. The LNA had previously deployed forces to southern Libya, but not on the same scale. An LNA spokesperson stated that the objective was to "secure the southwest from terrorist elements of Al-Qaeda, ISIS and rogue bandits involved in kidnapping, extortion and smuggling and threaten to change the topography of southern Libya." Additionally they intended to "secure key-strategic oil and gas installations, Man-made river (MMR) stations and ensure deliverance of services, fuel and gas to citizens." The LNA deployed multiple units to the area in mid-January 2019.

== Offensive ==
=== Battle of Sabha ===
The LNA began taking positions near Sabha on 15 January. On 18 January, the LNA reportedly carried out a raid against AQIM and Libyan militants of the Islamic State of Iraq and the Levant (ISIL) northwest of Sabha, claiming to have killed at least three notable terrorists, including Al-Mahdi Rajab Dungo (Islamic State Minister of Defence for Libya). These claims were not independently corroborated, and remained disputed. Furthermore, clashes between the LNA and rival militias continued inside the city, while Sabha's airport remained under GNA control. Negotiations began between local militias and the LNA about a peaceful handover of the entire town to the LNA.

Four members of the LNA's 128th brigade were killed in an ambush on 1 February near Sabha by Toubou tribesmen.

On 4 February, the GNA retreated from Sabha. According to GNA commander Ahmed al-Ataybi, Fayez al-Sarraj was not providing enough support to his forces, resulting in the withdrawal. The Libya Observer reported that there had been incidents of looting by the LNA.

=== Fighting for the oil fields and countryside ===
As the LNA advanced, Chadian rebel groups which had been based in the area came under increasing pressure. One faction, the URF, consequently decided to move from Libya back to Chad on 3–6 February 2019, hoping to launch an insurgency there. Instead, the URF was bombed by the French Air Force on the request of the Chadian government, and was forced to disperse. France, Chad, and the Libyan HoR had previously cooperated against the Chadian militants, as they consider them a destabilizing element in the region. The Chadian insurgents of the CCMSR accused Haftar of outright allying with the Chadian government to defeat them amid the offensive in southern Libya.

On February 6, the GNA appointed Ali Kanna, a Tuareg militia leader, as the commander of the southern military zone, which includes most of Fezzan. His Tuareg forces had originally fought for the Qaddafi government during the 2011 civil war and were originally from Mali. He made a deal with Prime Minister Fayez al-Sarraj, head of the Government of National Accord, in exchange for fighting Khalifa Haftar's LNA offensive. Since the, he attempted to unify the local Tuareg and Toubou militias against Haftar.

The LNA and the pro-GNA forces contested several key oil fields in the region, which were closed since December 2018 by the Libyan National Oil Corporation. Fighting broke out over the al-Sharara oil field, about 560 kilometres south of Tripoli, on 8 February. On the next day, Haftar declared southern Libya a no-fly zone. The al-Sharara field was secured by the LNA without any losses by 11 February. In the middle of the month the LNA began advancing to another one, al-Feel, and by 14 February was negotiating with GNA-aligned Toubou militants that controlled the oil field. They were also blocking the LNA's advance on to the city of Murzuq. The Chadian government closed its border with Libya in early March, officially to prevent Chadian rebels from crossing the border. As the desert border was impossible to control, the real aim of the announcement remained unclear; observers noted, however, that it coincided with the LNA offensive in southern Libya.

After Haftar's forces launched a major offensive to capture Tripoli and northwestern Libya in early April, some forces in southern Libya which had previously been opposed to both HoR as well as GNA allied themselves with the latter to counter Haftar's increasing power. One of these militias was the Islamist al-Sumud Front, led by Salah Badi, which had been loyal to the old National Salvation Government (NSG). Haftar also sent some LNA groups that were active in the south to the northwest to aid his assault on Tripoli, weakening the HoR's power around Sabha. ISIL's Libyan affiliates took advantage of this, attacking Fuqaha on 9 April. At this point, the offensive in the south had fizzled out.

== Aftermath ==
On 4 May, militants attacked a LNA military base near Sabha, killing seven to eleven soldiers of the 160th Battalion. The identity of the attackers remained disputed, as ISIL claimed responsibility, whereas the LNA blamed both Islamic State forces as well as Chadian insurgents. Furthermore, two other groups also claimed to have carried out the attack: The 166th Battalion, a pro-GNA unit, and the al-Sumud Front. Afterward, ISIL increased its rate of attacks in southern Libya, exploiting the volatile situation created by the LNA' offensive against Tripoli: Ghadwa was raided on 9 May, and the Zella oilfield was attacked on 18 May.

On 18 August, the Southern Protection Force of the GNA recaptured Murzuq after 2 weeks of heavy fighting with LNA aligned al Alhali forces.
