= Ali Kanna =

Libyan military general (born 1945)

- Born: 1945 (age 80–81); Libya
- Military career
- Allegiance: Libya
- Rank: Lieutenant-General
- Commands: Muammar Gaddafi's southern forces in the First Libyan civil war
- Conflicts: Ubari conflict First Libyan civil war Chadian–Libyan War

Ali Kanna Sulayman (Arabic: علي كنه سليمان; born 1945) is a Libyan lieutenant general of Tuareg origin. He was the commander of Muammar Gaddafi's southern forces in the First Libyan Civil War. After the end of the Fezzan campaign, he fled to Niger.

In 2013, he returned to the Fezzan region of Libya. He was subsequently involved in mediating the Ubari conflict. In 2015, he participated in negotiations in Doha to end the conflict between the Tuareg and the Toubou.

In February 2019, Prime Minister of the Government of National Accord, Fayez al-Sarraj, appointed Kanna as commander of the southern (Sabha) military zone.

== Biography ==
Ali Kanna was born in 1945. He joined a military college in 1967, and graduated as a lieutenant. He joined the Free Officers movement in March 1968, remaining as a member of it until al-Fateh Revolution.

During the Chadian–Libyan War, Kanna was put in charge of mobilizing ethnic Tuaregs in support of Libya. Following the formation of the Maghawir Brigade, Muammar Gaddafi appointed Kanna as its first head. Based in Ubari, this brigade consisted of 3,000 Sahelian Tuaregs from Niger and Mali and thus were accused of being mercenaries in the First Libyan Civil War. After the fall of the Gaddafi regime, some members of the Maghawir Brigade joined the National Movement for the Liberation of Azawad in Mali.

After the fall of Tripoli on 28 August 2011, Bani Walid, Sirte, and Kanna's southern forces in Sabha were the only major cities still controlled by the Gaddafi regime. On 6 September 2011, a large convoy of pro-Gaddafi Tuareg fighters in Kanna's southern battalion crossed into Algeria before entering Niger. Kanna was rumored to be part of this convoy, amidst other rumors that Gaddafi himself and his son Saif al-Islam would catch up with this convoy and join Kanna en route to Burkina Faso.

In 2013, Kanna reportedly returned to Libya from his exile in Niger. After playing a role in mediating the Ubari conflict between the Tuareg and Toubou in 2015, Kanna called for the creation of a multi-ethnic army of the south (Fezzan army) that espoused Gaddafi's Jamahiriya ideology. In 2016, Kanna held a ceremony in Ghat to commemorate the 47th anniversary of Gaddafi's al-Fateh Revolution. Officers controlling the southern Fezzan region unilaterally appointed Kanna as their commander without consulting Khalifa Haftar. After his appointment, Kanna claimed that his forces would not be involved in politics and called for the unification of Libya between the Tripoli-based Government of National Accord and the Tobruk-based House of Representatives. He also stated that the formation of "Libyan Arab Armed Forces in South Libya" was an internal matter for the southern region.

In 2017, Kanna's forces peacefully took control of the El Sharara oil field from Misrata's 13th Brigade militia. Following Saif al-Islam Gaddafi's release by Zintan, he was rumored to have joined Kanna's forces in Ubari. Kanna went to Algeria to meet with Algerian Minister of Foreign Affairs, Abdelkader Messahel. Kanna allegedly has close ties to Algerian intelligence.

After Khalifa Haftar's Libyan National Army launched its Southern Libya offensive in the Second Libyan Civil War, Kanna called for the Government of National Accord to dissuade Haftar from destabilizing the Fezzan region. The following month, he was appointed by Fayez al-Sarraj as commander of the military zone in Sabha. His role was to defend the El Sharara oil field from being taken over by Haftar and to unite the Tuareg and Toubou militias against Haftar. Kanna's appointment backfired as local public opinion appeared to strongly support Haftar's takeover and most of Fezzan, including Sabha and the El Sharara oil field, fell to Haftar. Kanna criticized southern fighters who supported Haftar's Western Libya campaign and called on them to withdraw immediately. As of June 2021, Kanna's Tuareg brigades remain in control of Ghat, Ubari, Murzuk, and the Issine border crossing (the southern crossing point between Libya and Algeria). On 28 September 2022, Kanna advocated for the unification of the Libyan armed forces while attending the graduation ceremony of the Ubari Military Training Center.
