= Tuareg militias of Ghat =

Ethnic Tuareg tribal militias

Tuareg Tribe of Ghat
- TMG
- Berber flag often used by the Tuareg militias
- Dates active: 2014–Present
- Headquarters: Ghat
- Active regions: Fezzan (mainly Ghat District), Libya
- Ideology: Berberism
- Wars: the Second Libyan Civil War

Tuareg militias of Ghat (TMG) are ethnic Tuareg tribal militias, operating in South-West Libya desert areas during the Second Libyan Civil War. The militias rose to prominence in the district of Ghat, which has a Tuareg majority. Gradually, the Tuareg forces expanded their hold also into neighbouring districts. The Libyan Tuaregs are supported by Tuaregs of Mali and groups like Ahmed al-Ansari, with support from the Misratan Libyan Dawn forces. Tuareg militias often utilize the Berber flag.

Tuareg militias are one of a number of factions vying for power in southern Libya, which from 2012 onward has suffered from conflict among Arab, Tabu, and Tuareg tribes.

== Operations ==
Military situation in Libya as of June 2020. Government of National Unity and allies (recognized by United Nations) Under the control of the Tobruk-led Government of National Stability and Libyan National Army Controlled by local forces Controlled by Tuareg forces (For a more detailed map, see military situation in the Libyan Civil War)

=== 2014 ===
Clashes between Tuareg and Tebu tribal militias have repeatedly flared in Ubari at various times during October 2014. The Tebu tribes are affiliated with the Tobruk government in East Libya. On November 5, 2014, a Tuareg militia reportedly seized control of the El Sharara oil field in Fezzan.

=== 2015 ===
In July 2015, clashes between Tuaregs and Tebu tribes reached Sebha, the biggest city in southern Libya, forcing hundreds of families to flee their homes.

Efforts to negotiate a truce between Tuaregs and Tebu in September 2015 halted because the ceasefire was violated.

On 23 November 2015, the Tuareg and Tebu tribal representatives signed a cease fire deal in Doha, Qatar, in the attempt to end the 14 month-long conflict over Obari. Libya Tripoli government welcomed the signing of the ceasefire deal in a statement and thanked Qatar for mediating the process. The ceasefire agreement ended more than a year of violent clashes between the two groups in which more than 300 people had been killed and some 2,000 injured, according to medical sources.

=== 2016 ===
Due to renewed tensions in Ubari, a task force of the Hasawna tribe was dispatched to Ubari in early February 2016 with a mandate to end ongoing clashes between Libya's Tebu and Tuareg ethnic groups. Reportedly, the move came in line with a ceasefire agreement signed in November 2015 in Doha by Tebu and Tuareg representatives.

=== 2019 ===
In February 2019, both the Tuareg and Tubu temporarily united under the GNA and its Tuareg commander General Ali Kanna to defend against advances by the LNA under General Khalifa Haftar in Fezzan.
