= Banu Khurman =

Dynasty of medieval Libya

The Banu Khurman were a local tribe in Wadi Ajal and the Murzuq region in the Fezzan (present-day Libya). They have also historically been referred to as "Qurmān", "Husmān", or "Khurmān". They have been identified by some writers as probable descendants of the Garamantes.

At an uncertain date, perhaps around 1500, they established their domination over the Fezzan region, following the Kanem Empire's loss of power in this region. In 1320, the Banu Khurman raged a deadly war against the Kanem empire and their vassals in the region. Some time after their war with Kanem, in 1330 the Banu Khurman led a large campaign against Ghadames. Some Arab sources suggest Hafsid involvement, but no clear sources suggest that they were able to capture Ghadames.

Their domination of the Fezzan region was later usurped by the Awlad Muhammad tribe, which remained a dominant force here until the early 19th century.
