= Battle of Traghan =

2018 battle in Libya

- Part of the Second Libyan Civil War
Date	27 December 2018
Location	Traghan, Libya
Result	Libyan National Army victory

Belligerents
(Libya) Libyan National Army	Chadian militants, possibly bandits/rebels allied with ISIL and/or CCMSR

Commanders and leaders
(Libya) Lt. Col. Khalid Masoud Rahoma † (Libya) Col. Juma al-Thabet (WIA)	Unknown

Units involved
10th Infantry Brigade: Battalion 181	Unknown

Strength
Unknown	Unknown number of fighters 1 armoured vehicle 10 cars

Casualties and losses
1 killed 13 wounded 24–34 vehicles captured	Unknown

The Battle of Traghan was fought between the Libyan National Army and a Chadian armed group in Traghan on 27 December 2018.

== Background ==
After the Second Libyan Civil War broke out in 2014, as numerous armed factions started to fight for control of Libya, the different Libyan parties began to hire Chadian and Sudanese mercenaries to fight for them. As a result, armed groups (including insurgents) would cross into Libya, and became increasingly involved in local politics. One of the rebel groups that has become active in Libya is the "Military Command Council for the Salvation of the Republic" (CCMSR), a Chadian rebel faction which intended to overthrow Idriss Déby, President and de facto dictator of Chad since 1990.

== Battle ==
On 27 December 2018, Chadian irregulars launched a surprise attack on a camp of the Khalifa Haftar-loyal Libyan National Army's 10th Infantry Brigade in Traghan. The militants who were described as being well-trained, used 10 cars and one armored vehicle to initially overrun part of the camp, including its headquarters, where they killed the commander of the brigade's Battalion 181, Lieutenant Colonel Khalid Masoud Rahoma. The assistant commander of the LNA garrison, Colonel Juma al-Thabet, was wounded and captured by the irregulars.

The surprised garrison troops rallied, however, and with the support of local civilians launched a counter-attack. Besides al-Thabet, twelve other soldiers were also wounded amid the fighting. After about two to three hours of combat, the Chadians were forced to retreat under heavy fire by mid-day. They left Colonel al-Thabet behind, but managed to retreat with 24 to 34 captured military vehicles.

== Aftermath ==
In response to the attack, Traghan's LNA garrison began a security sweep in the area, hoping to find and eliminate the attackers. The LNA soldiers tracked the Chadians, whom they initially identified as rebels or bandits, until Ghadduwah. What happened when they arrived there is disputed. According to the Arab Weekly, they found no insurgents present, whereas the Libya Herald reported that they encountered and defeated a detachment of Chadian militants. In either case, the 10th Infantry Brigade's soldiers freed 22 hostages at Ghadduwah. These people were previously believed to have been kidnapped by suspected Libyan Islamic State insurgents during brutal raids in the region during October and November 2018. At the time, the Islamic State had claimed responsibility for the raids. The discovery that a Chadian militant base had hosted hostages of the Islamic State led Libyan officials to question if possible links between Chadian rebels and Libyan jihadists might exist. Furthermore, a few days after the battle at Traghan, a leading CCMSR member was arrested in Tripoli, resulting in further speculations about the nature of the Chadian attackers. The Libya Herald claimed later on, however, that the Chadians at Ghadduwah belonged to another militia than the ones who had attacked Traghan.

Various Libyan political factions as well as local residents condemned the attack, while one Chadian opposition group, the "Chadian People's Revolutionary Army", claimed on behalf of the Chadian opposition that no Chadians had been involved in the fighting. The LNA increased its presence in the region due to the battle at Traghan. On 2 January 2019, Khalifa Haftar sent additional troops to southern Libya, and the LNA launched an offensive to evict rival forces, including Chadian militias, from the area in mid-January.
