= Zizau =

Zizau جيزاو
- Village
- Location in libya
- Coordinates: 25°54′N 14°10′E
- Country: Libya
- Region: Fezzan
- District: Murzuq
- Time zone: UTC+2 (EET)

Zizau or Zezow (Arabic: جيزاو) is a village in the Murzuk Desert in Murzuq District in southwest Libya. It is located east of Murzuk and just to the southwest of Funqul. A good high road is said to connect Zizau to Traghan, with frequent incrustations of salt. The village was visited by Western explorers in 1822-24 who described it at the time as having "merely a few huts".
