= QUB =

QUB may refer to:

- Huallaga Quechua, a Quechuan language with ISO 639-3 code qub.
- Quarry Bay station, Hong Kong (MTR station code).
- Qub Radio, a Quebec-based Internet radio channel
- Queen's University Belfast, a public Irish research university in Belfast.
- Ubari Airport, a Libyan airport with IATA airport code QUB.
