= List of regions of Libya by Human Development Index =

Historical regions of Libya

This is a list of the three historical regions of Libya by Human Development Index as of 2025 with data for the year 2023.

Rank	Region	HDI (2023)
High human development
1	Tripolitania	0.726
–	Libya (average)	0.721
2	Fezzan	0.720
3	Cyrenaica	0.712
