= Llandovery Epoch =

First Series of the Silurian

Llandovery
- 443.1 ± 0.9 – 432.9 ± 1.2 Ma
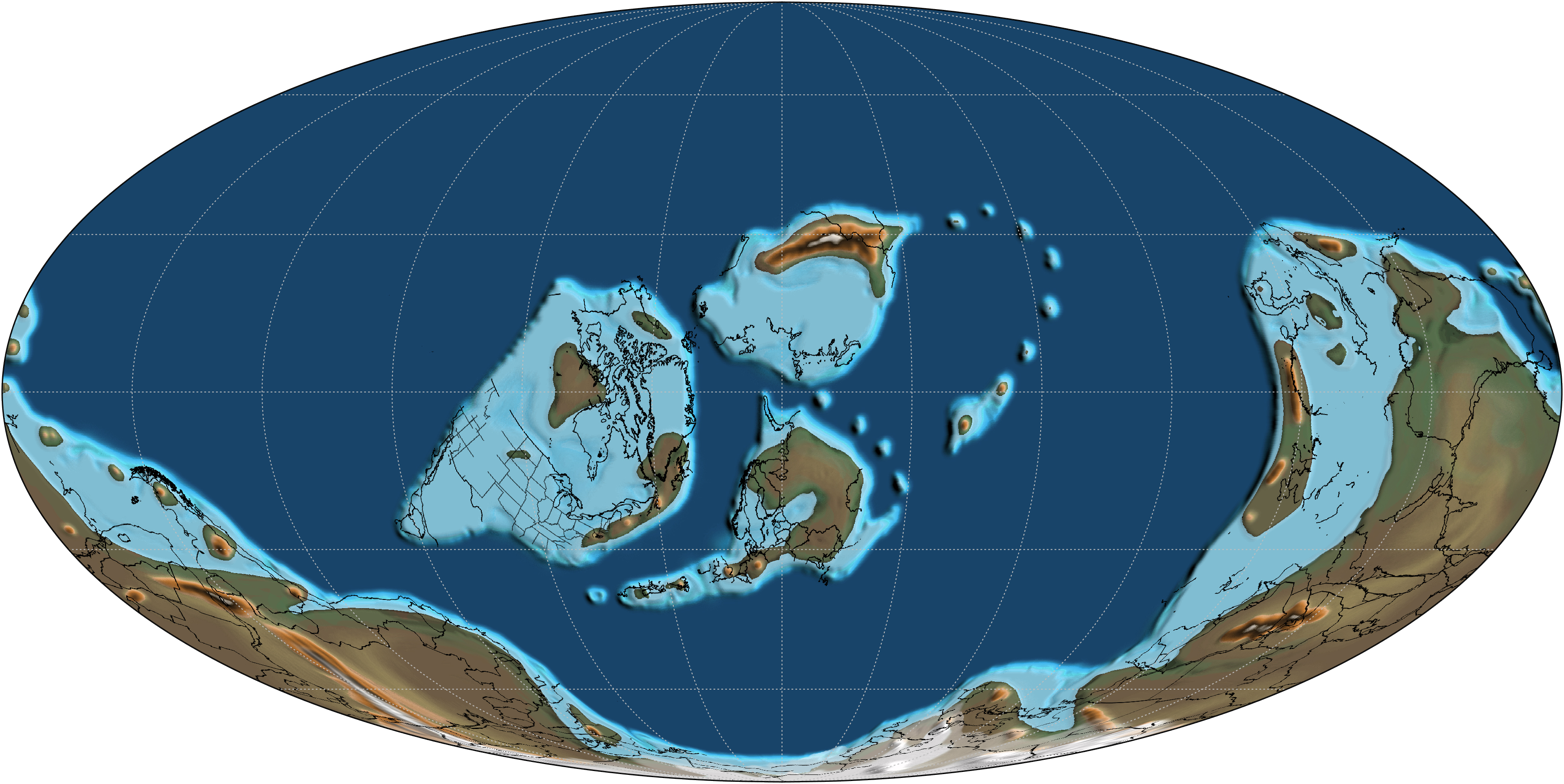
- A map of Earth as it appeared 440 million years ago during the Llandovery Epoch, Aeronian Age

Chronology
← / Lau event; ← / Mulde event; ← / Ireviken event
Subdivision of the Silurian according to the ICS, as of 2024. Vertical axis scale: Millions of years ago

Etymology
- Name formality: Formal
- Name ratified: 1984

Usage information
- Celestial body: Earth
- Regional usage: Global (ICS)
- Time scale(s) used: ICS Time Scale

Definition
- Chronological unit: Epoch
- Stratigraphic unit: Series
- Time span formality: Formal
- Lower boundary definition: FAD of the Graptolite Akidograptus ascensus
- Lower boundary GSSP: Dob's Linn, Moffat, UK; 55.4400°N 3.2700°W
- Lower GSSP ratified: 1984
- Upper boundary definition: Imprecise. Currently placed between acritarch biozone 5 and last appearance of Pterospathodus amorphognathoides. See text for more info.
- Upper boundary definition candidates: A conodont boundary (Ireviken datum 2) which is close to the murchisoni graptolite biozone.
- Upper boundary GSSP candidate section(s): None
- Upper boundary GSSP: Hughley Brook, Apedale, UK; 52.5811°N 2.6389°W
- Upper GSSP ratified: 1980

In the geological timescale, the Llandovery Epoch or Early Silurian (from 443.1 ± 0.9 million years ago to 432.9 ± 1.2 million years ago) occurred at the beginning of the Silurian Period. The Llandoverian Epoch follows the massive Ordovician-Silurian extinction events, which led to a large decrease in biodiversity and an opening up of ecosystems.

Widespread reef building started in this period and continued into the Devonian Period when rising water temperatures are thought to have bleached out the coral by killing their photo symbionts.

The Llandoverian Epoch ended with the Ireviken event which killed off 50% of trilobite species, and 80% of the global conodont species.

== Beginning of Silurian ==
The end of the Ordovician–Silurian extinction event occurred when melting glaciers caused the sea level to rise and eventually stabilize. Biodiversity, with the sustained re-flooding of continental shelves at the onset of the Silurian, rebounded within the surviving orders.

Following the major loss of diversity as the end-Ordovician, Silurian communities were initially less complex and broader niched. Highly endemic faunas, which characterized the Late Ordovician, were replaced by faunas that were amongst the most cosmopolitan in the Phanerozoic, biogeographic patterns that persisted throughout most of the Silurian.

These end Ordovician–Silurian events had nothing like the long-term impact of the Permian–Triassic and Cretaceous-Paleogene extinction events. Nevertheless, a large number of taxa disappeared from the Earth over a short time interval, eliminating and changing diversity.

=== GSSP ===
The epoch was named after Llandovery in Wales. The GSSP for the Silurian is located in a section at Dob's Linn (southern Scotland) in an artificial excavation created just north of the Linn Branch Stream. Two lithological units (formations) occur near the boundary. The lower is the Hartfell Shale (48 metres (157 ft) thick), consisting chiefly of pale gray mudstone with subordinate black shales and several interbedded meta-bentonites. Above this is the 43 metres (141 ft) thick Birkhill Shale, which consist predominantly of black graptolitic shale with subordinate gray mudstones and meta-bentonites.

The base was originally defined as the first appearance of the graptolite Akidograptus ascensus at Dob's Linn, but was later discovered to be imprecise. It is currently placed between acritarch biozone 5 and last appearance of Pterospathodus amorphognathoides.

It has been recommended to place the GSSP at a slightly higher and correlatable level on the Ireviken datum 2, which coincides approximately with the base of the murchisoni Graptolite Biozone.

== Subdivisions ==
The Llandovery Epoch is subdivided into three stages: Rhuddanian, Aeronian and Telychian.

=== Regional stages ===
In North America a different suite of regional stages is sometimes used:

- Ontarian (Early Silurian: late Llandovery)
- Alexandrian (Earliest Silurian: early Llandovery)

In Estonia the following suite of regional stages is used:

- Adavere stage (Early Silurian: late Llandovery)
- Raikküla stage (Early Silurian: middle Llandovery)
- Juuru stage (Earliest Silurian: early Llandovery)

== Palaeontology ==
=== Plants ===
Spores and plant microfossils have been found in China and Pennsylvania. There was some movement to the land during the Llandovery but the earliest known vascular plants (Cooksonia) have only been found in rocks of the middle Silurian.

=== Land animals ===
Parioscorpio venator was at first described as the earliest fossil land animal in 2020. It was originally described as the oldest known scorpion (437 million years old), but was later re-described as an enigmatic, marine arthropod.

== Reef expansion ==
Barrier reef systems covered a substantially greater percentage of seafloor than reefs today and they also grew at high latitudes. Possibly the evolution of photo symbionts started in the Llandovery Epoch. Tabulate corals mostly developed as prominent bioherms. Rising water temperatures in the Devonian might have led to bleaching of these corals.

== Ireviken event ==
The Ireviken event was the first of three relatively minor extinction events (the Ireviken, Mulde, and Lau events) during the Silurian Period. The Ireviken overlapped the Llandovery/Wenlock boundary. The event is best recorded at Ireviken, Gotland.

=== Anatomy of the event ===
The event lasted around 200,000 years, spanning the base of the Wenlock Epoch.

It comprises eight extinction "datum points"—the first four being regularly spaced, every 31,000 years, and linked to the Milankovic obliquity cycle. The fifth and sixth probably reflect maxima in the precessional cycles, with periods of around 16.5 and 19 ka. The final two data are much further spaced, so harder to link with Milankovic changes.

=== Casualties ===
The mechanism responsible for the event originated in the deep oceans, and made its way into the shallower shelf seas. Correspondingly, shallow-water reefs were barely affected, while pelagic and hemipelagic organisms such as the graptolites, conodonts and trilobites were hit hardest. 50% of trilobite species and 80% of the global conodont species become extinct in this interval.

=== Geochemistry ===
Subsequent to the first extinctions, excursions in the δ^{13}C and δ^{18}O records are observed; δ^{13}C rises from +1.4‰ to +4.5‰, while δ^{18}O increases from −5.6‰ to −5.0‰.

== See also ==
- Acacus Sandstone
