= Acacus Sandstone =

Silurian geologic formation in Ghat, Libya

- Stratigraphic range: Llandovery; ~443–423 Ma
- Type: Formation

Lithology
- Primary: Sandstone
- Other: Shale

Location
- Coordinates: 25.0°N 10.2°E
- Approximate paleocoordinates: 77.5°S 116.9°E
- Region: Ghat District
- Country: Libya
- Extent: Libyan Desert
- Acacus Sandstone (Libya)

The Acacus Sandstone is a geologic formation in the Ghat District, southwestern Libya. The unit preserves fossils dating back to the Llandovery epoch of the early Silurian period.

== Fossil content ==
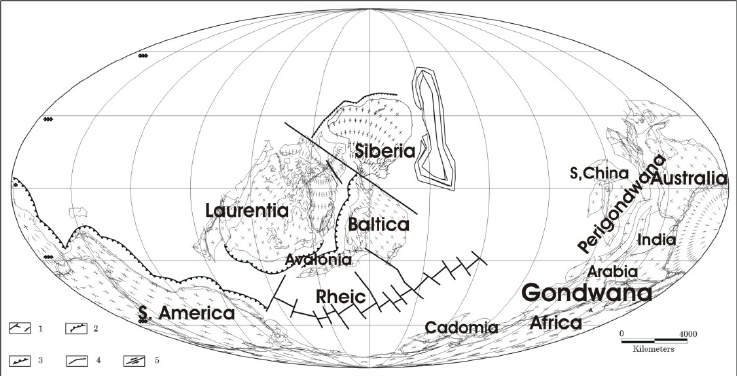
Paleogeography of the Early Silurian, 435 Ma

The formation has provided the following fossils:

=== Trilobites ===
- Trilobita indet.

=== Eurypterids ===
- Carcinosoma sp.
- Pterygotus sp.

=== Invertebrates ===
- Mollusca indet.

=== Ichnofossils ===
- Arthrophycus sp.
- Cruziana sp.
- Cubichnia sp.
- Dimorphichnus sp.
- Paleophycus sp.
- Pelecypodichnus sp.
- Rusophycus sp.

== See also ==
- Fish Bed Formation, Silurian fossiliferous formations of Scotland
- Lipeón Formation, Silurian fossiliferous unit of Bolivia
- Soom Shale, Late Ordovician Lagerstätte of South Africa
- Bertie Formation, Silurian Lagerstätte of Ontario and New York
- Andean-Saharan glaciation
