= Traghan =

Traghan تراغن Taraghen
- Town
- Location in libya
- Coordinates: 25°55′24″N 14°25′14″E
- Country: Libya
- Region: Fezzan
- District: Murzuq
- Time zone: UTC+2 (EET)

Traghan or Traghen and Turaghan (Arabic: تراغن) is a small town in the Murzuk Desert in Murzuq District in southwest Libya. It is located east of Murzuk and Zizau. A good high road is said to link Traghan to Zizau in the west, with frequent encrustations of salt.

The word is of Toubou (Gara'an) origin and is pronounced Taraghan or Turaghan both correct, with three syllables: Tu or Ta means "land," ra refers to "inhabitants," and ghan means "small." Altogether, Turaghan or Taraghan translates to “inhabitants of the small land.”

== History ==
Traghan was founded by the Saifawa dynasty around the 13th century, a remarkable feat as Traghan lies 1,380 kilometres from Njimi, the Saifawa capital. The Saifawa were said to have "gained control of the Fezzan by establishing a post in the oasis of Traghan about twenty miles east of modern Murzuk and some seventy miles west-south-west of ancient Zawila."

Traghan was approached by western explorers on 29 November 1822. In the late 1820s, Traghan was described as formerly as considerable a place as Murzuk; And was, about sixty years ago, the residence of a sultan, who governed eastern Fezzan. It was described as being in a flat, desert plain, with gardens and date groves. It contained four mosques with small mud minarets and houses that were mostly large but in ruin. The population in the late 1820s was estimated to be 500-600 but it had previously been far more populous. Major Denham noted that the people of Traghan were exceptionally skilled in carpet making and their carpets rivaled those of Constantinople. Hugh Murray later noted its fine carpets in the early 1850s.

The town was the site of a battle between the Libyan National Army and Chadian militants in 2018 during the Second Libyan Civil War.
