= Tmassa =

- Town
- Location in Libya
- Coordinates: 26°22′N 15°48′E
- Country: Libya
- Region: Fezzan
- District: Murzuq
- Time zone: UTC+2 (EET)

Tmassa is a small town in the Sahara Desert of central Libya about 482 kilometres (300 mi) from the Gulf of Sidra. It lies about 161 kilometres (100 mi) south-east of Sabha. Its population is 500.

== Maps ==
- http://www.maplandia.com/libya/murzuq/tmassah/
