= Nc186 =

Oil field in Libya

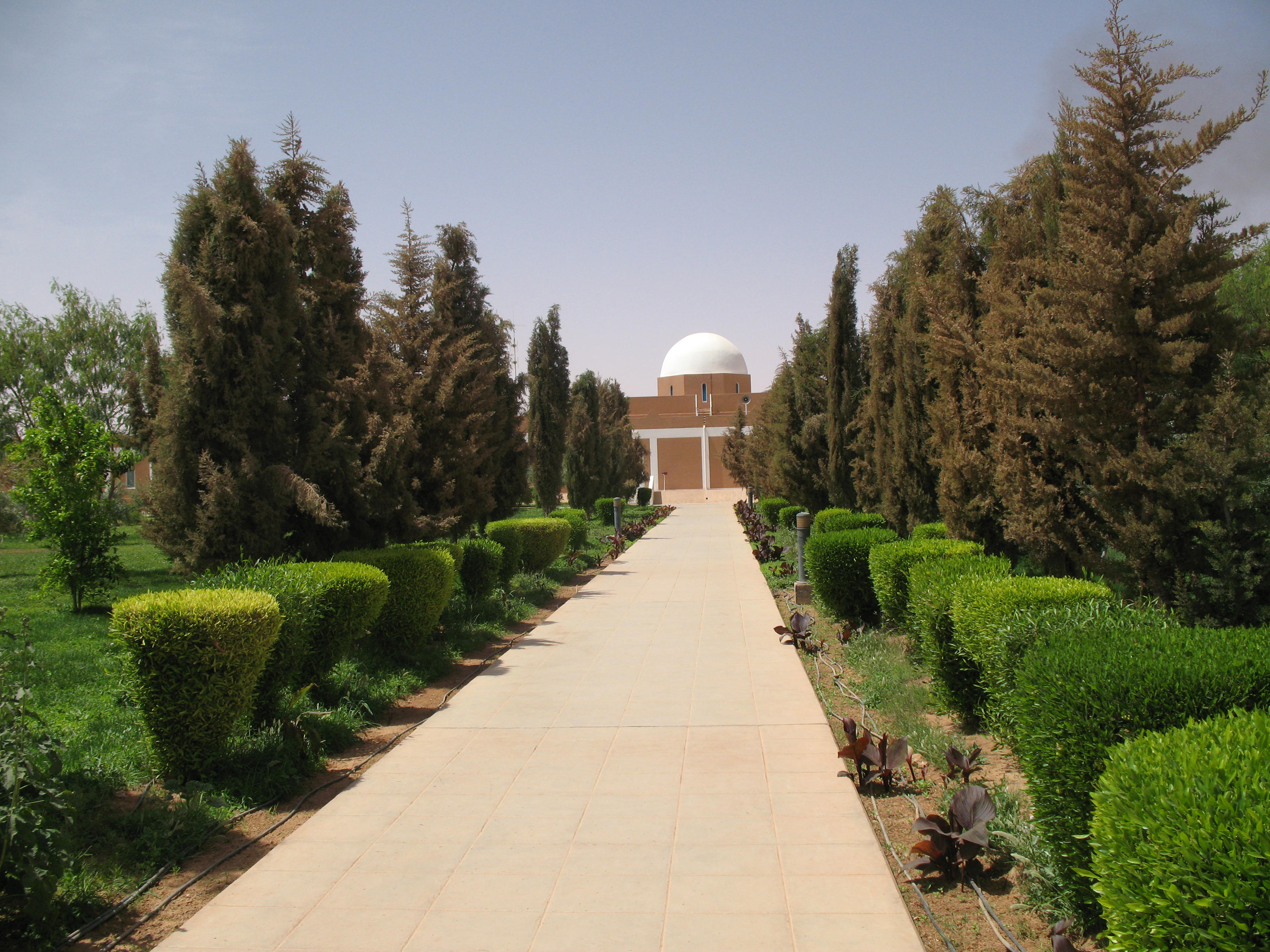
Repsol's administrative building (Sharara-NC186)

NC186 is an oil field located in the southwest of Ubari, Libya. It is operated by Repsol.

The oilfield is located in the Murzuq Basin, immediately to the northeast of Repsol's NC115 acreage. It forms part of the El Sharara.

In November 2005, Repsol announced, in a statement to the Madrid stock exchange, a new oil well with an estimated production capacity of 4,650 barrels per day at block NC186 "in the prolific basin of Murzuq". Repsol said the find was discovered just 16 kilometres to the north of the last find in the same block at the start of October.

== See also ==
- List of oil fields
