= Movement for Justice and the Rehabilitation of Niger =

- Leader: Adam Tcheke Koudigan
- Dates active: September 2016 – present
- Active regions: Niger
- Ideology: Nationalism

The Movement for Justice and the Rehabilitation of Niger is a political and military organisation based in Niger. The movement is made up of Toubou. The movement announced its foundation in September 2016 as a result of marginalization of the community by the government of Niger. It promised to attack natural resource sites to achieve its aim for "fundamental rights."

== History ==
The Toubou people have complained about being marginalised, while they also have a high illiteracy rate due to the harsh conditions of the landscape in which they reside. The Toubous people are spread across Niger, Chad, Libya and Sudan.

== Founding ==
The group's leader, Adam Tcheke Koudigan, announced on 7 September 2016, that the group would target areas near uranium mines. He also accused the government of neglecting environmental degradation near oil sites.

The Movement for Justice and the Rehabilitation of Niger wishes to inform... that we will take up an armed fight to obtain our fundamental rights. We are on the ground, ready... and when the time comes, we will attack Niger. The government of Niger has remained completely indifferent to our more than legitimate demands.

They further blamed China National Petroleum Corporation for "making millions of dollars" by ignoring the welfare of locals.

== Leadership ==
Adam Tcheke Koudigan has described himself as interim president of the group.
