= El Sharara oil field =

Oilfield in Murzuq Desert, Libya

El Sharara Oil Field
- Location of the El Sharara oil field within Libya
- Country: Libya
- Region: Murzuq Desert
- Offshore/onshore: onshore
- Coordinates: 26.576696°N 12.21805°E
- Operator: Akakus Oil Operations

Field history
- Discovery: 1980
- Start of production: 1996

Production
- Current production of oil: 300,000 barrels per day (~1.5×10^{7} t/a)
- Estimated oil in place: 403 million tonnes (~ 500×10^{6} m^{3} or 3000 million bbl)

The El Sharara oil field is an oil field located in Murzuq Desert in Libya. It was discovered in 1980 and developed by Petrom. The oil field, Libya's largest, is operated and owned by Repsol. The total proven reserves of the El Sharara oil field are 3 billion barrels (403 million tonnes), and production is centered on 300,000 barrels per day (48,000 m^{3}/d).

On January 7, 2024, production at the oil field was briefly suspended after protesters from the nearby town of Ubari forced the facility to close over fuel shortages.

On September 21st, 2026, a major valve was shut by an unnamed armed group in the oil field, resulting in a drop in production.
