= Ghadduwah =

- Town
- Location in Libya
- Coordinates: 26°26′00″N 14°18′00″E
- Country: Libya
- Region: Fezzan
- District: Sabha
- Time zone: UTC+2 (EET)

Ghadduwah is a Saharan desert oasis town in the Fezzan region of southwest Libya.

== See also ==
- List of cities in Libya
