= Ubari Airport =

Ubari Airport مطار أوباري
- IATA: QUB; ICAO: HLUB

Summary
- Airport type: Military/Public
- Serves: Ubari, Libya
- Elevation AMSL: 1,528 ft / 466 m
- Coordinates: 26°34′05″N 12°49′25″E

Map
- Location within Libya

Runways
Direction	Length		Surface
Direction	m	ft	Surface
10/28	2,850	9,350	Asphalt
- Source: GCM Google Maps SkyVector

Ubari Airport (IATA: QUB, ICAO: HLUB) is an airport serving Ubari, a city in the Wadi al Hayaa District of Libya. It is mostly military, but has recently been used by Prepare2go for civil aviation flying safaris around the country.

The runway is asphalt, with a 200 metres (660 ft) concrete touchdown zone on each end.

The Ubari non-directional beacon (Ident: UBR) is located on the field.

== Airlines and destinations ==
Airlines	Destinations
Libyan Airlines	Tripoli–Mitiga

== See also ==
- Transport in Libya
- List of airports in Libya
