= Sharaf al-Din Qaraqush =

12th century Turkish Mamluk commander

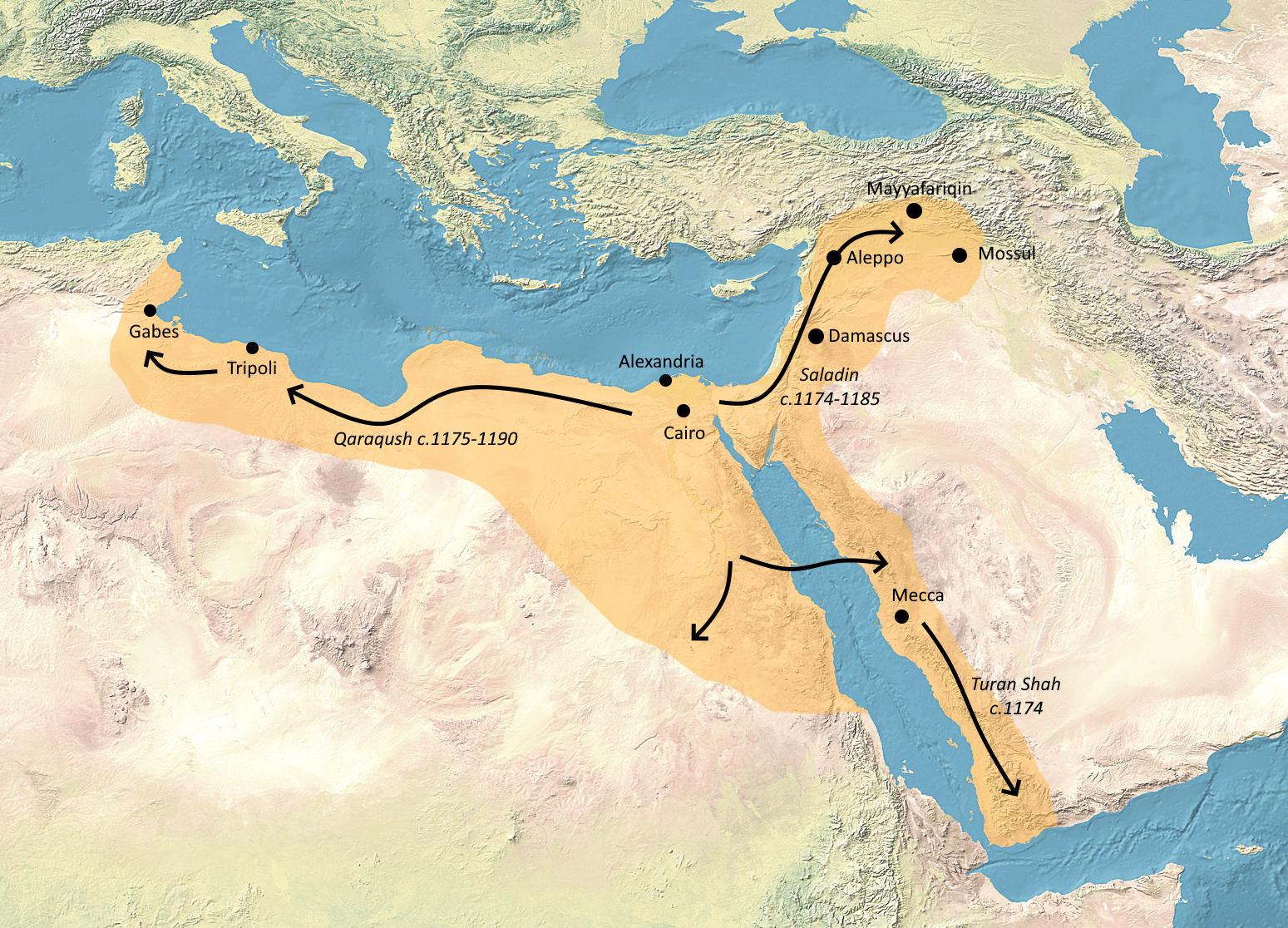
Ayyubid expansion 1174-1193, including the western expansion of Qaraqush.

Sharaf al-Din Qaraqush al-Armanī al-Muzaffari al-Nasiri, also al-Taqavi and al-Ghuzi (died 1212) was an Ayyubid Mamluk, who was of Armenian origin according to historians Ibn Khaldun and Muḥammad ibn Khalīl Ibn Ghalbūn of Ottoman Libya. Under the service of the Ayyubid prince al-Muzaffar (nephew of Saladin) He engaged in a series of campaigns of conquest in Tripolitania and Ifriqiya between 1172 and the 1190s. Operating on behalf of Saladin initially, but increasingly on his own account, he fought against the expanding Almohad Caliphate and allied with the Banu Ghaniya.

His conquest of Tripoli (modern-day Tripoli, Libya) occurred during his campaigns between 1172–1174. He ruled the area for many years and was still based in Tripoli circa 1185-1186, even taking control of the Tunisian Jarid with his ally Ali b. Ghaniya (Ali ibn Ishaq, 1184–1187/1188), moving his headquarters to Gabis.

In the end, he fell out with the Ghaniya, and was defeated and executed by Yahya ibn Ghaniya (Yahya ibn Ishaq, 1187/1188–1235/1236) at Waddan in 1212.

== Sources ==
- Baadj, Amar S. (2015). Saladin, the Almohads and the Banu Ghaniya. Leiden: Brill. ISBN 978-90-04-29620-6.
- Baadj, Amar S. (2018). "Qarāqūsh al-Armanī". In Fleet, Kate; Krämer, Gudrun; Matringe, Denis; Nawas, John; Rowson, Everett (eds.). Encyclopaedia of Islam (3rd ed.). Brill Online. doi:10.1163/1573-3912_ei3_COM_46355. ISSN 1873-9830.
- Ehrenkreutz, Andrew S. (1972). Saladin. Albany: State University of New York Press. ISBN 0-87395-095-X.
- Pellat, Ch. (1978). "Ḳarāḳūs̲h̲". In van Donzel, E.; Lewis, B.; Pellat, Ch. & Bosworth, C. E. (eds.). The Encyclopaedia of Islam, Second Edition. Volume IV: Iran–Kha. Leiden: E. J. Brill. p. 614. doi:10.1163/1573-3912_islam_SIM_3916. OCLC 758278456.
- Öngül, Alı (2001). KARAKUŞ, Şerefeddin - An article published in Turkish Encyclopedia Of Islam (in Turkish). Vol. 24 (Kaani - Kastamonu). Istanbul: TDV Encyclopedia of Islam. pp. 442–443. ISBN 9789753894517.
