= Toubou Front for the Salvation of Libya =

Ethnic group in the Libyan Civil War

- جبهة التبو لإنقاذ ليبيا
- Leader: Issa Abdel Majid Mansur
- Dates active: June 2007–August 2011; March 2012–present
- Headquarters: Oslo, Norway
- Active regions: Southern Libya
- Ideology: Toubou nationalism
- Wars: Libyan Civil War, Post-civil war violence in Libya

The Toubou Front for the Salvation of Libya (Arabic: جبهة التبو لإنقاذ ليبيا, romanized: Jibhat al-tibū li-inqādh Lībiyā; French: Front Toubou pour la Salut de la Libye) is a group created in mid-2007 to defend the rights and interests of the Toubou people in Libya. It is led by Jomode Eli Getty and Issa Abdel Majid Mansur, in France 2 activist Libyan Toubou tribal leader, and has its headquarters in Oslo, Norway. The group, which had participated in the Libyan Civil War on the NTC side, was disbanded in August 2011, with the fall of Tripoli.

The group was revived in March 2012, with the aim of "protecting the Toubou from ethnic cleansing", following the early 2012 deadly clashes between Toubou and Arab militias in southern Libya, which caused the loss of hundreds of lives.

== 2008 Kufra conflict ==
In December 2007, the government of Libya stripped Toubou tribes from their citizenship, after being accused of aligning with Chad in past wars, or of being Chadians, not Libyans (Toubous live at both sides of the common border). Tensions rose in 2008 when Libyan officials urged Toubou tribes to depart to Chad, and finally exploded on 2 November 2008 in Kufra, when a protest against the exclusion of Toubou children from education and health care ended with the government local office on fire. During the next few days, the Toubous clashed with Zuwayya tribes, who were known for having been armed by the Libyan government during the war with Chad. Finally on 8 November, the Libyan Army intervened to stop the escalating violence encircling the town with troops and helicopters, and on 14 November the clashes ceased apart from some minor skirmishes. On 10 November, Abdel Majid declared that the Toubou tribes could sabotage the Sarir oilfields near the oasis town, and denied that the clashes were between Toubous and other tribes, but against "regime troops".

On 20 November, a Toubou tribal meeting with Libyan officials was held in Kufra, which blame foreign media for distorting the incidents, rejected the TFSL as representative of the Toubous, defined Abdel Majid as "corrupt and irresponsible" and Muammar Gaddafi as "...the wise man of Africa, the founder of its unity and the strong advocate of its security, stability and freedom". Depending on sources, the final toll is believed to be between 11 and 30 killed, and a hundred wounded.

== Libyan civil war ==
During the Libyan Civil War, the TFSL and many Toubou militiamen joined the ranks of the NTC, fighting against the Libyan Army in southern Libya. In February 2011, forces commanded by Issa Abdel Majid Mansur briefly controlled Murzuq and Qatrun, being later repelled by Libyan government troops.

Abdel Majid was tasked by the NTC in late 2011 on the issue of securing the borders with Chad and Sudan. During the Second Libyan Civil War, the Toubou militias aligned themselves, along with their former opponents, the Tuareg militias, under the UN-recognized government, Government of National Accord against the Libyan National Army.
