= Awlad Muhammad =

African tribe

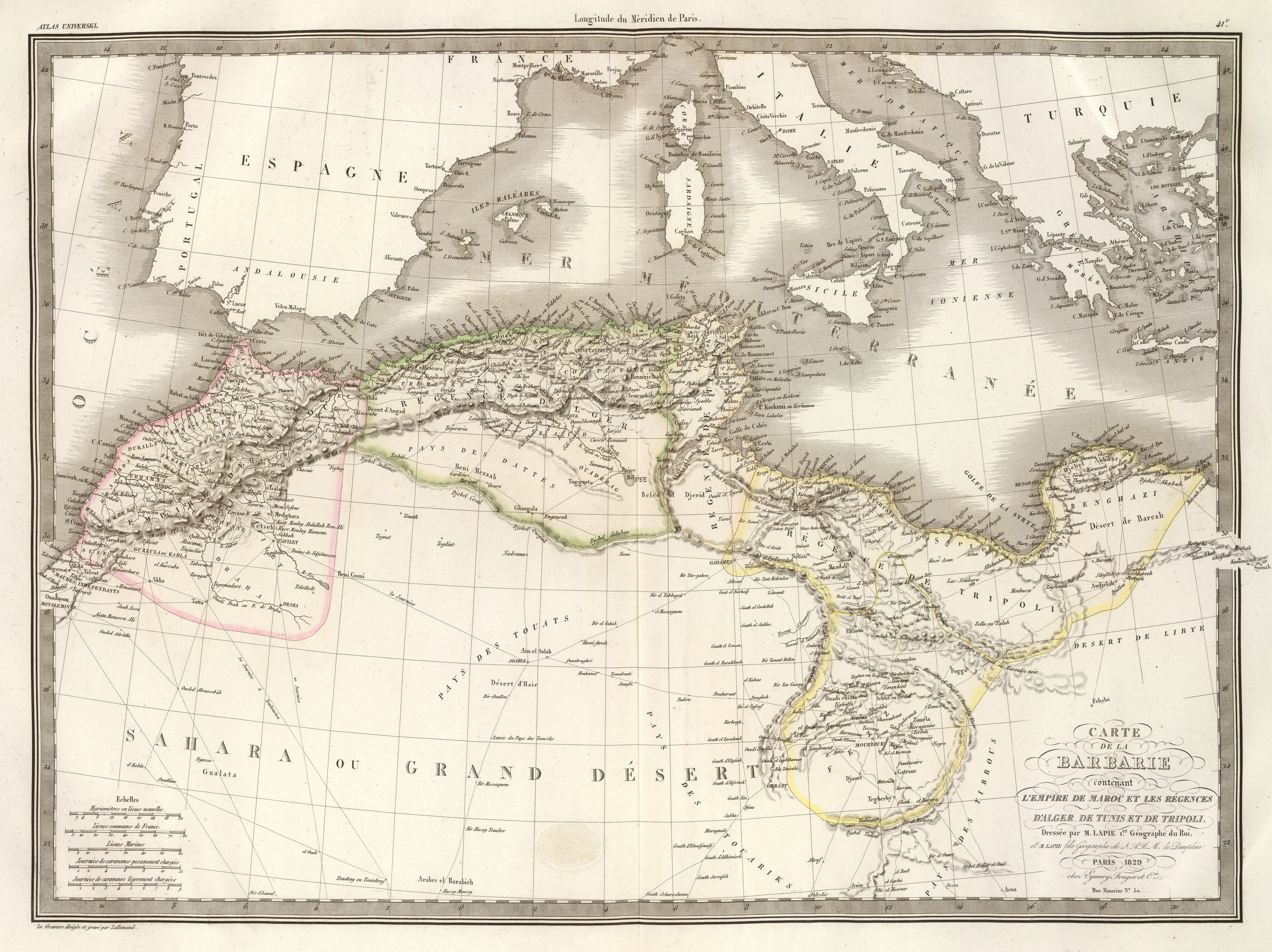
1829 Lapie Map of the Eastern Mediterranean and the Barbary states - David Rumsey Historical Map Collection - Barbarie-lapie-1829

Awlad Muhammad (or Ouled Muhammed) was a tribe that ruled over the Fezzan region from 1550 to 1812. At their height, their domain extended from Sokna in the north to Murzuq in the south, as well as in the present-day territories of Chad and Niger

The Muhammad Awlad dynasty was a prominent family from a sharif from Morocco named Muhammad al-Fasi who formed and was credited as the founder of the Awlad dynasty, which governed the Fezzan region, located in present-day southwestern Libya, from the late 15th century until the early 19th century. Emerging amid the decline of previous tribal confederations, the dynasty established control over key oases and trade routes that connected sub-Saharan Africa to the Mediterranean Sea.

== The Desert Trade ==
The Awlad Muhammad controlled the largest market in the Sahara trade, which consisted of the slave-trading route of the Saharan routes via Ghasames. The eastern route, that ran into Murzuq, this route would continue into present-day Northern Nigeria. The western route ran from Ghadamis to Ghat via Tripoli into the Awlad state from there it continued into the Bilad al-Sudan, Niger, Mali, Mediterranean coast and Egypt in the north, Sudan and the sub-Saharan Africa to the south. İts trade across the Sahara was much profitable, trading Luxury goods such as cloth, ivory, ostrich feathers, gold, goatskin, guns, and slaves. They also sold cloth and guns, from its demanding rulers in West African kingdoms, and naturally its richness in the Fezzan markets, which they had controlled for centuries. This had attracted the Ottoman administration in Tripoli to take over integrate them as a part of its tributary system.

== Relations with Kanem-Bornu ==
İn 1258 during the reign of Mai Dunama II Dibalemi. The Kanem's armies had advanced into Fezzan and established authority there, and appointed deputies to administer the region. The Kanem's authority over the Fezzan continued to exist until the end of the 14th century. The Awlad dynasty later became a client state of Bornu empire and the fezzan remained the border between Bornu and the Ottomans.

== First Ottoman period ==
In 1574 the Ottoman Tripolitania Empire, under Mahmut bey, invaded and occupied Fezzan, the Oasis, and a significant part of the Southern Sahara (present day niger and Chad), expelling the local ruler Sultan Bulālah Muḥammad, and overthrowing him out of power. Most African historians believe this occurred in the year 1577, the same year that Idris Alooma sent his diplomatic delegation to the Ottomans. Mahmut Bey also exerted great effort in transferring the Ottoman system to Central Africa. He descended from Murzuq (Libya) with 500 soldiers southward at a distance of 1950 km^{2} from the Mediterranean Sea; following a direct path, they reached the northern and southern parts of Lake Chad. The greater part of the Sahara forms significant portions of present-day Niger, all of which were annexed to the Fezzan district (later the vassal). King Idris Aluma, ruler of the Kanem-Bornu Sultanate, sent three ambassadors to Istanbul in 1577 and offered his allegiance. Firearms were sent from Tripoli by order of the Ottoman court, and the sultanate came under Ottoman rule Fezzan had been vassailized since 1574,

== Struggle against ottoman ==
In 1583 and 1585, Ottoman garrisons were slaughtered by the local rebels, leading to the Alwads return to power, under influence of Bornu and Tripoli. But still under the Ottoman Control, as Sultan Murad III consolidated and stabilized Ottoman rule over the city and extended its influence to the surrounding area.

== Tripolitania Attack on Fezzan ==
From 1625 and 1632, expeditions Against Fezzan by Ramadan Dey, who had attacked the people of Fezzan, who refused to pay their taxes, so in the 1640s, the people of Murzuk asked the dey Saqizli to intervene in the Trouble, so an agreement was demand of payment of a tribute of 4 thousand mithqals which is approximately 20 kilos of gold, and half should be in slaves.

== Second Ottoman Period ==
The awlads would continue their struggle against the Tripoli administration and Ottoman occupation. Where the Bornu would aid them military against the Ottomans. Sulayman or Safar Day had demanded an annual tribute from the Awlad Muhammad to the authorities in Tripolitania, where they claimed it to pay back up amount of tribute from the years of Nasir's Independence, but in 1626 the occupying Turkish forces would withdrawn in return for the awlads to recognize ottoman influence where the ottomans would in exchange regonize the awlads hereditary authority, as long as they were under Ottoman influence. and ultimately the Tripoli Beylerbey granted Fezzan their autonomy in their own internal affairs on the condition that they regularly paid their taxes and accept ottoman rule. But this was short lived when Muhammad bin Juhaym returned to Murzuq, where he overthrew the Ottoman Bey in 1639, and assumed control. But the Turks retaliated with attacks on Fezzan, which turned into a destructive fighting between the Awlads and the Turks. Eventually the Turks and the Awlad Muhammad made peace, Where thy arranged that the Awlad Muhammad would pay the Turks each year in four thousand mithqals of gold, two thousand in gold dust and two thousand in slaves but this arrangement ended in 1682 when Sultan Najib M. Jhaym refused to pay the tribute, so an ottoman army led by Murad al-Malti attacked the capital and killed the Sultan. His son, Sultan Muhammad al-Nasir, agreed to pay tribute until 1689, when he refused to pay the Tribute, so the Tripolitania governor Muhammad Sha'ib al-'Ain dispatched an Ottoman army. But al-Nasir defeated the army and did not pay tribute until 1715.

== Karamanli Period ==
From 1711 to 1835, Fezzan and the most of Libya came under Karamanli dynasty's influence, After Yusuf expanded Karamanli influence, into the trans-Saharan trade routes by sending expeditions leading to Kanem–Bornu. In 1804, the Karamanlı failed to receive the annual tribute from the Awlad Muhammad, who are now ruled the central Fazzan. Yusuf Pasha patched an armed force where After the siege of the city Al-Mukni, the Qaramanli commander massacred the Awlad Muhammad tribe, and by 1807 he was able to force all the tribes of Cyrenaica and the Awlad Sulayman, to submit to him, he also brought the tribes of the entire Fezzan under direct control, after he took advantage the weakness of the Awlad family, and was able to end their rule.

== Last ottoman period ==
The Ottomans occupied the Karamanlı in 1835, and by 1842 occupied Fezzan again, where the Awlād Sulaymān rebelled but was crushed following the same year. Most of the tribes were forced to move south into the Sahara and beyond. in 1875 ghat was occupied, and the Tibesti mountains in 1879. This was the deepest into the Sahara than the Porte's authority had ever extended before. After the period of Mahmut Sancak-bey. But the Benghazi and Derna rebellion were still ongoing, but both came under direct rule and the revolt were quickly crushed and new fortifications built

== See also ==
- Banu Khattab
- Kanem–Bornu Empire
- Ottoman Tripolitania
- History of Libya
