= Ubari =

Ubari Imohagh name           = ⵓⴱⴰⵔⵉ Original wadi name = Wadi AlAjal أوباري Awbari
- Town
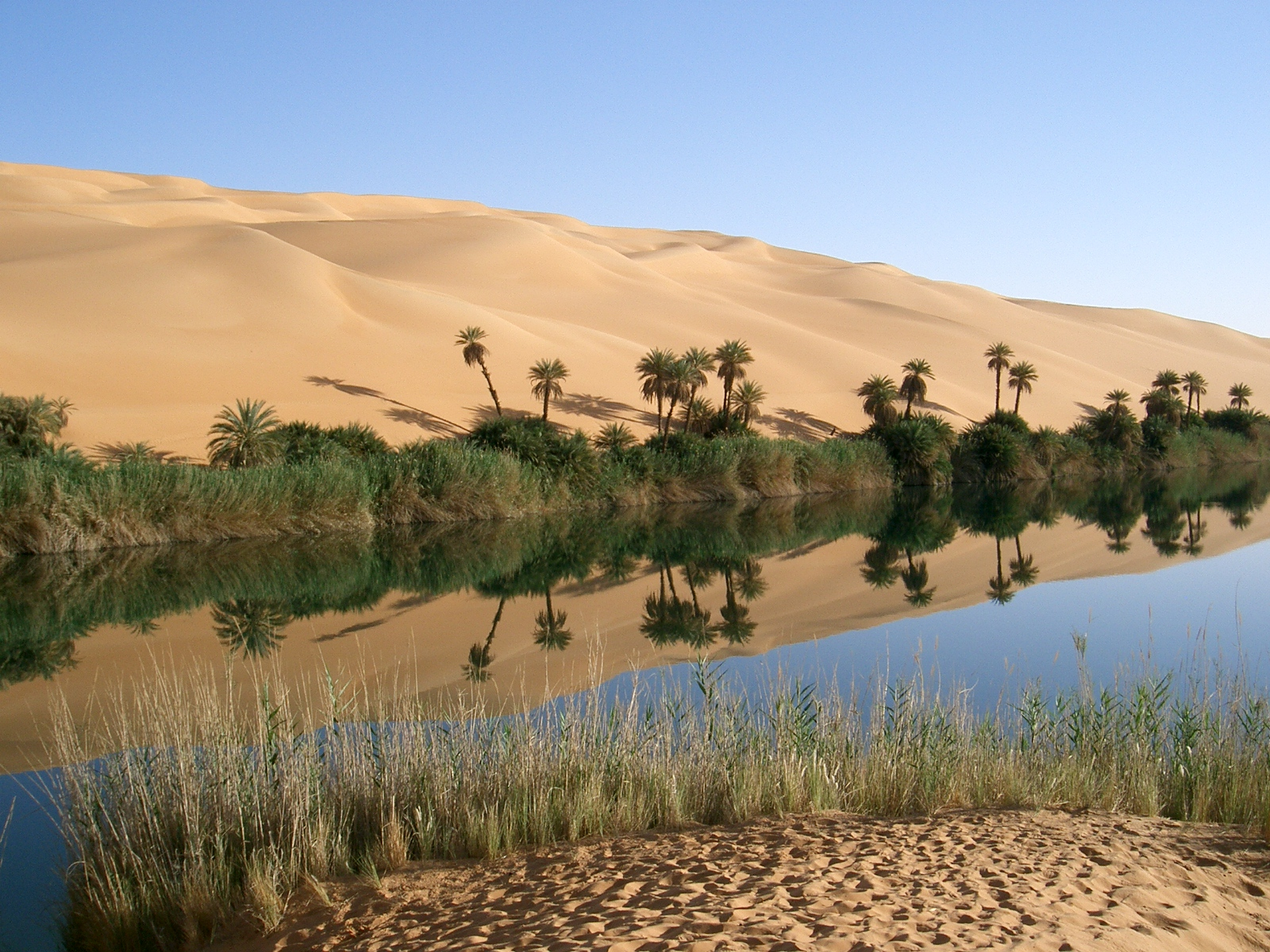
- An Ubari oasis lake, with native grasses and date palms.

- Location in Libya
- Coordinates: 26°35′N 12°46′E
- Country: Libya
- Region: Fezzan
- District: Wadi al Hayaa
- Elevation: 1,535 ft (468 m)

Population (2009)
  - Total: 35,000
- Time zone: UTC+2
- License Plate Code: 24

Ubari or Awbari (Arabic: أوباري, romanized: ‘Awbārī) is an oasis town and the capital of the Wadi al Hayaa District, in the Fezzan region of southwestern Libya. It is in the Idehan Ubari, a Libyan section of the Sahara Desert. It was the capital of the former baladiyah (district) called Awbari, in the southwest of the country.

== Geography ==
Ubari is in the Targa valley, lying between the Messak Sattafat plateau and Idhan Ubari erg sand dunes and lakes. Native plants include wetland grasses at the natural spring-fed lakes' shorelines, and the native Saharan date palm (Phoenix dactylifera).

Ubari is located in one of the sunniest and driest areas in the world. It has a hot desert climate (Köppen climate classification BWh) with short, very warm winters but long, extremely hot summers. Average annual rainfall is one of the lowest on the planet with only 8 mm (0.31 in) and many decades may easily pass without any rainfall at all. Ubari has permanent, unlimited sunshine and clear skies all year round and in all seasons. Clouds are extremely rare over this bone-dry land. Average high temperatures exceed 40 °C (104 °F) from June to September.

NC186 is an oil field in southwest Ubari, operated by Repsol.

== Libyan civil wars ==
During the 2011 Libyan civil war, the town was captured by the forces of the National Transitional Council on 22 September 2011.

On 19 November 2011, Saif al-Islam Gaddafi and a few associates were captured and detained about 50 kilometers west of Ubari as they were trying to flee to neighbouring Niger.

== See also ==
- Ubari Airport
- List of cities in Libya
