= Murzuk =

Murzuk مرزق
- Town
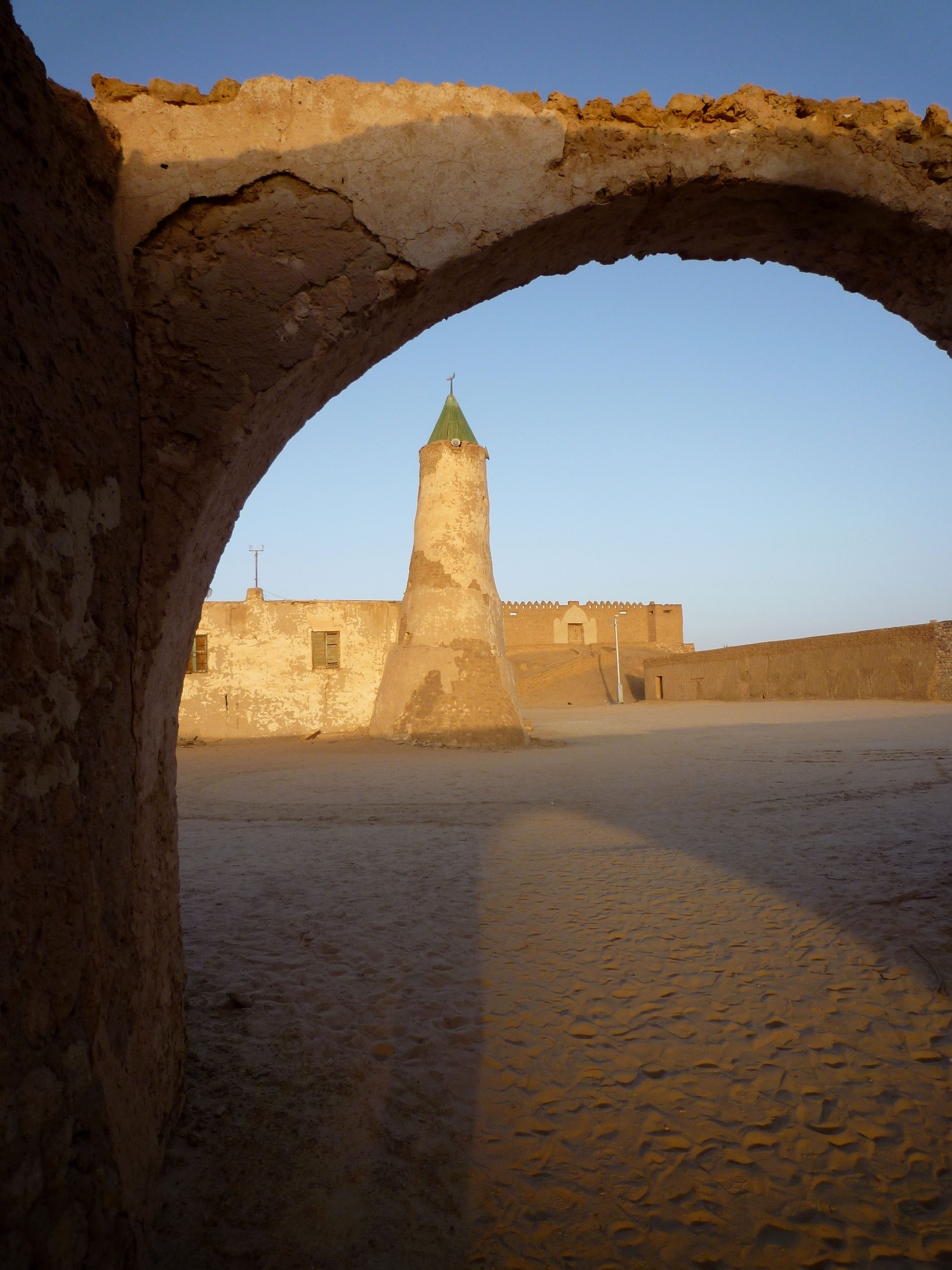
- Fort and mosque of Murzuk

- Location in Libya
- Coordinates: 25°54′49″N 13°55′01″E
- Country: Libya
- Region: Fezzan
- District: Murzuq
- Elevation: 1,486 ft (453 m)

Population (2011)
  - Total: 12,746
- Time zone: UTC+2 (EET)
- License Plate Code: 15

Murzuk, Murzuq, Murzug or Merzug (Arabic: مرزق) is an oasis town and the capital of the Murzuq District in the Fezzan region of southwest Libya. It lies on the northern edge of the Murzuq Desert, an extremely arid region of ergs or great sand dunes which is part of the greater Sahara Desert.

== History ==
Murzuk developed around an oasis which served as a stop on the north-south trade route across the Sahara Desert. From the 5th century BC to the 5th century AD, Marzuk was home to the Garamantian Empire, a city state which operated the Trans-Saharan trade routes between the Carthaginians—and later the Roman Empire—and the Sahelian states of West and Central Africa. By 1300, the area was ruled by the Arab Banu Sulaym tribe. According to Helmuth Kanter, a Moroccan tribe overran the area in 1310 and established Murzuk as the capital of their sultanate. The fortress, now in ruins, was built around this time. By 1400 the city was ruled by the Bornu Empire, and the legacy of Kanem-Bornu sovereignty is still evident, as some streets have names in the Kanembu and Kanuri languages. In the latter half of the 15th century, the area became a tributary of the Hafsid dynasty in Tunis.

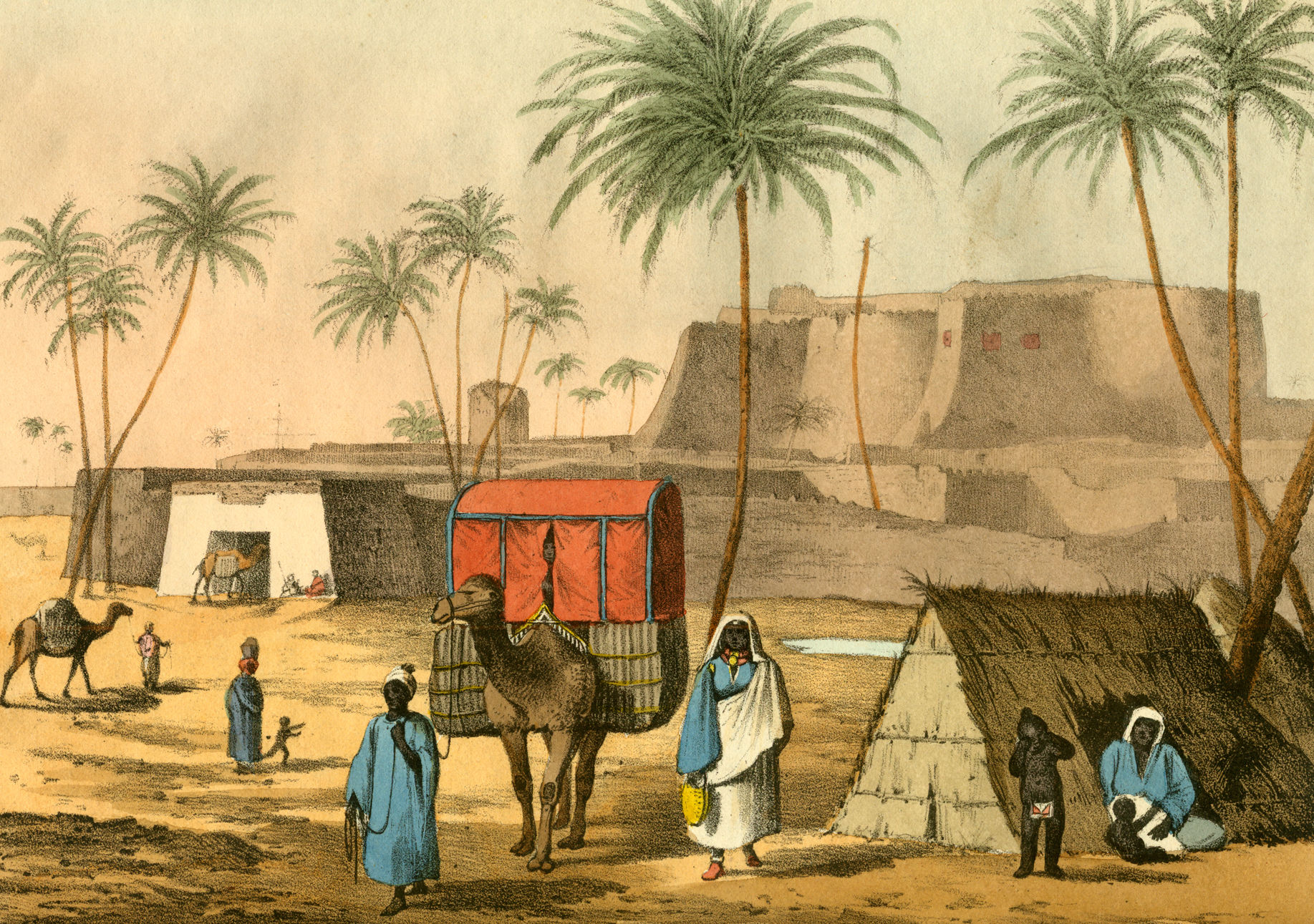
Murzuk in 1821

Early in the 16th century, Muhammad al-Fasi established the Awlad Muhammad dynasty of Murzuq, which would hold power in the city until 1812. Al-Fasi is traditionally held to be a Moroccan sharif, but according to John Ralph Willis, oral tradition indicates that he was a pilgrim from Saguia el-Hamra in present-day Western Sahara. According to this tradition, he was the leader of a caravan who, on arriving at the fortress of Murzuk, was asked to take control of the city by local Fezzani rulers. The reason suggested for this is an intensification of Tuareg or Berber raids, or that he was attracted by slave trade. According to tradition, he built a castle in Murzuk, which has been identified possibly as the ruined "Qal'at Awlad Muhammad". The establishment of his dynasty reinvigorated pilgrim traffic and the slave trade, and Murzuk soon became an important part of a slaving network which extended into present-day Chad and Central African Republic. By the late 16th century, it had gained more importance than Ghat and Ghadames.

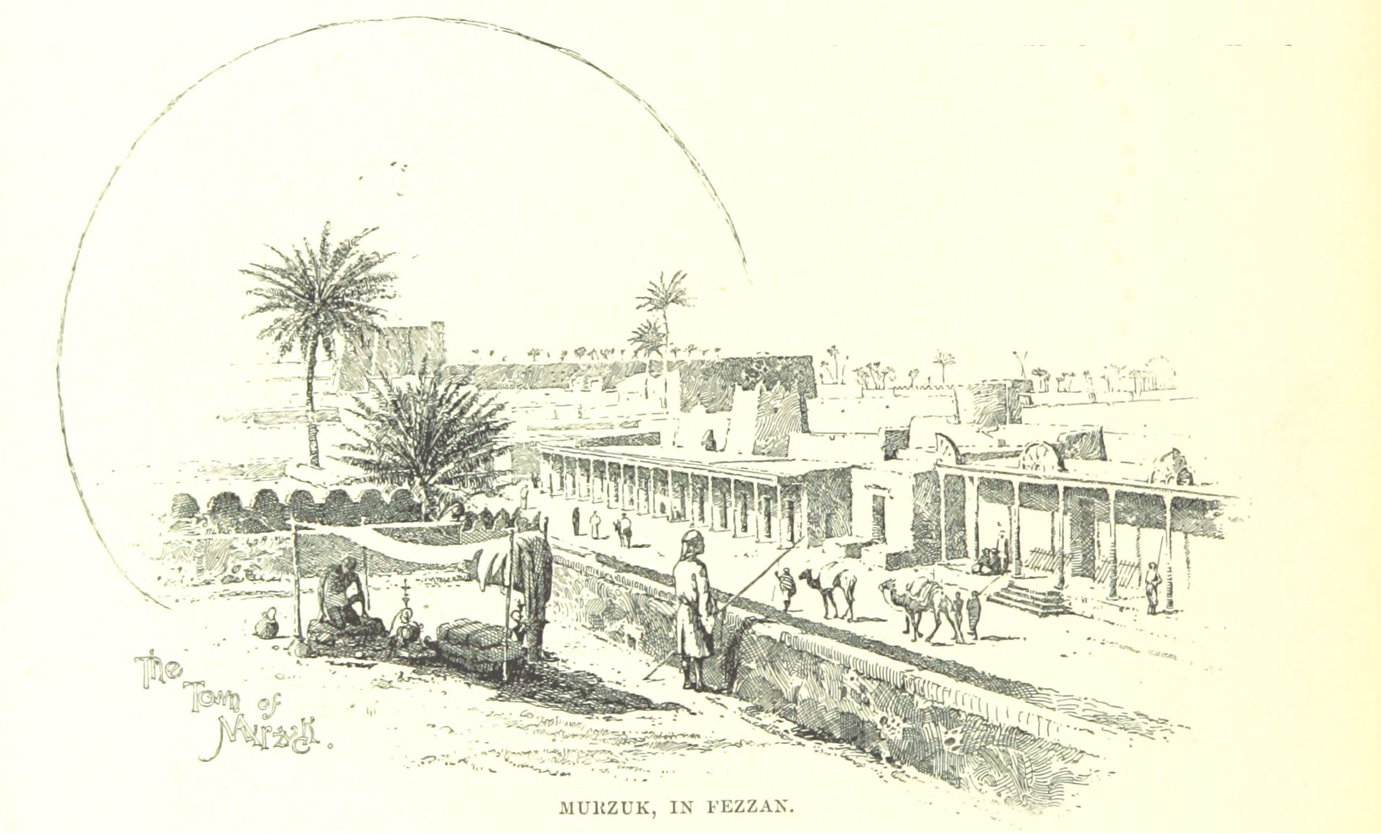
Murzuk in a 19th-century illustration

Under Ottoman rule (1574–1912), Murzuk was at times the capital of Fezzan, and enjoyed a long period of prosperity. The town had a major fort, and was termed the "Paris of the Sahara". The Ottoman Army usually maintained a garrison there, but local control remained in the hands of the Sultan of Fezzan.

In the early nineteenth century, Murzuk served as the jumping off point for multiple British expeditions in search of Lake Chad and the legendary Timbuktu. The 1822, the Denham, Oudney and Clapperton expedition traveled from Tripoli to Murzuk, where they attempted to obtain protection and supplies for their journey south. The town was considered unhealthy by many British explorers and led to illness for many, killing some and forcing others back to Tripoli. According to James Richardson: "Feb 26th (1846). I must now consider myself recovered from indisposition. At first, people talked so much about Mourzuk fever that I thought I must have it as a matter of course ... Three-fourths of the Europeans who come here invariably have the fever. I speak of the Turks. It attacks them principally in the beginning of the hot, and cold, weather, or in May and November. ... Mourzuk is emphatically called, like many places of Africa, Blad Elhemah, country of fever."

The town declined in importance as modern transportation replaced traditional trade routes in the late 19th and 20th centuries. The Ottomans ceded Fezzan, along with the rest of their Libyan territories, to the Italians in 1912, following the Italo-Turkish War. Murzuk became part of colonial Italian Libya, although the town was not actually occupied by the Italians until 1914.

On 11 January 1941, during the Second World War, Murzuk and its small Italian airbase were the target of a raid by about 70 men of the British Long Range Desert Group and a handful of Free French soldiers from Chad. A small Italian garrison holed up in the old Ottoman fort eventually surrendered to the attackers, and the planes and facilities at the nearby airbase were destroyed. The British and Free French then withdrew, setting the garrison free, as they didn't have the transport or rations to carry the prisoners back to allied lines.

In 1960 Murzuk had a population of 7,000 residents.

=== Libyan civil war ===
During the Libyan Civil War, Toubou tribal fighters reportedly captured Murzuk on 17 August 2011. On 22 February 2019 it was reported by the Benghazi General Command that Murzuk had been captured by forces loyal to General Khalifa Haftar. On 4 August 2020, an airstrike by the Libyan National Army against a wedding in Murzuk killed 43 people and injured 60.

== Climate ==
Murzuk has a hot desert climate (Köppen climate classification BWh) typical of the Fezzan, a Libyan region lying on the heart of the Sahara Desert. Averages high temperatures exceed 40 °C (104 °F) during summer for 3 months (June, July, August) and averages high temperatures remain above 19 °C (66.2 °F) during the coldest month of the year. Winter days are very warm, sunny and dry. Annual precipitation averages only 7 mm (0.32 in) making the location one of the driest places on Earth. The sky is always clear and bright throughout the year.

Climate data for Murzuk
Month	Jan	Feb	Mar	Apr	May	Jun	Jul	Aug	Sep	Oct	Nov	Dec	Year
Mean daily maximum °C (°F)	19.4 (66.9)	23.3 (73.9)	27.5 (81.5)	33.1 (91.6)	38.3 (100.9)	41.5 (106.7)	42.4 (108.3)	41.3 (106.3)	39.1 (102.4)	33.5 (92.3)	26.2 (79.2)	20.0 (68.0)	32.1 (89.8)
Daily mean °C (°F)	12.7 (54.9)	15.8 (60.4)	20.1 (68.2)	25.5 (77.9)	30.4 (86.7)	33.7 (92.7)	34.3 (93.7)	33.4 (92.1)	31.5 (88.7)	26.4 (79.5)	19.5 (67.1)	13.4 (56.1)	24.7 (76.5)
Mean daily minimum °C (°F)	5.9 (42.6)	8.2 (46.8)	12.7 (54.9)	17.8 (64.0)	22.4 (72.3)	25.9 (78.6)	26.3 (79.3)	25.7 (78.3)	23.9 (75.0)	19.2 (66.6)	12.8 (55.0)	6.8 (44.2)	17.3 (63.1)
Average precipitation mm (inches)	1 (0.0)	0 (0)	1 (0.0)	1 (0.0)	1 (0.0)	0 (0)	0 (0)	0 (0)	0 (0)	1 (0.0)	1 (0.0)	1 (0.0)	7 (0)
Source: L'Ajjer, Sahara central

== Culture ==
In 2013, the first Toubou national festival in Libya was held in Murzuk. The city also has an annual cultural festival, which was postponed in 2014 due to security concerns. In 2013, two new cultural centers were opened in the town and six more were reported to be close to completion.

In 2003, the municipality of Murzuk had 68 educational institutions, 1277 classrooms and 3009 teachers.

== See also ==
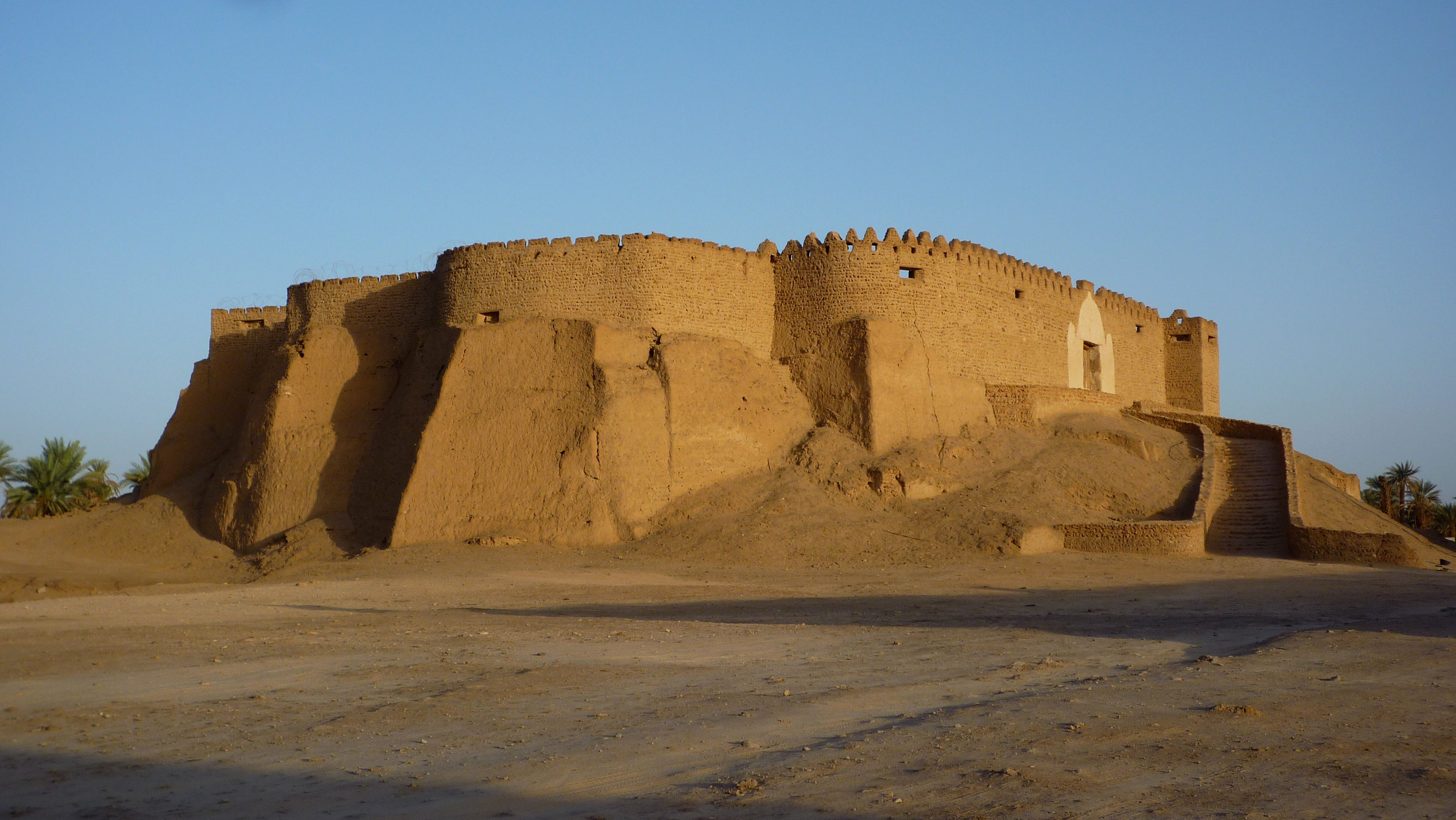
Ottoman Empire era fortress of Murzuk.

- List of cities in Libya
