= Fezzan =

Province of Libya

Coordinates: 26.3328°N 13.4253°E

Fezzan ⴼⵣⵣⴰⵏ (Berber languages) فَزَّان (Arabic)
- Region
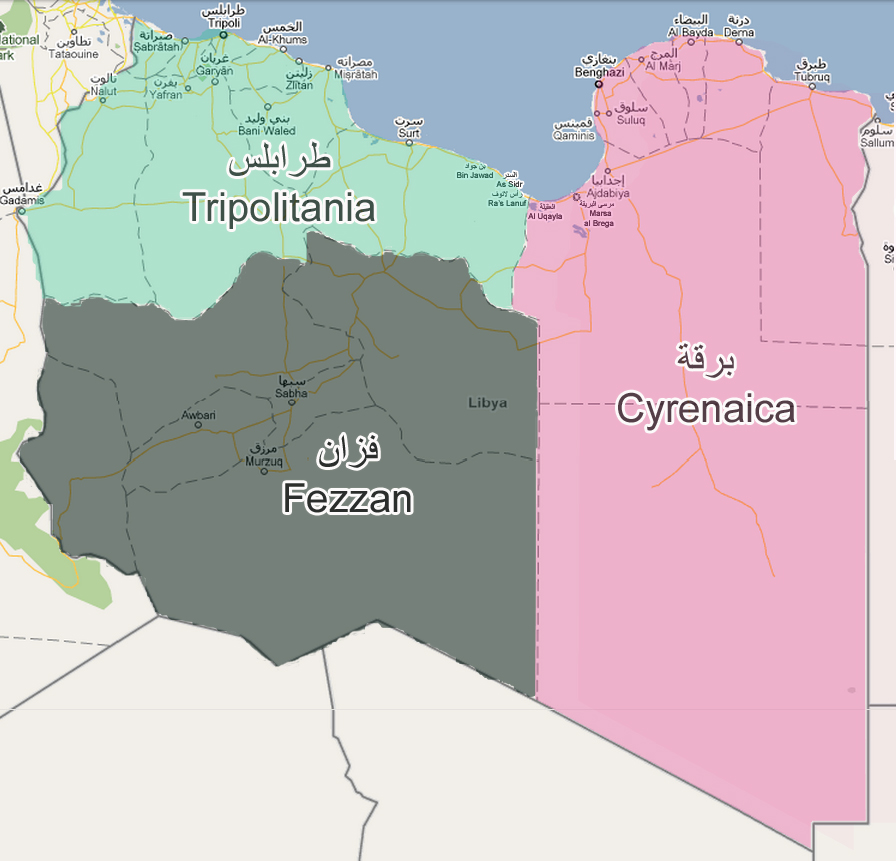
- Country: Libya
- Capital: Sabha

Population (2006)
  - Total: 442,090

Fezzan (UK: /fɛˈzɑːn/ fez-AHN, US: /fɛˈzæn, fəˈzæn/ fez-AN, fə-ZAN; Berber languages: ⴼⵣⵣⴰⵏ, romanized: Fezzan; Arabic: فَزَّان, romanized: Fazzān [fazˈzaːn]; Latin: Phazania) is the southwestern region of modern Libya. It is largely desert, but broken by mountains, uplands, and dry river valleys (wadis) in the north, where oases enable ancient towns and villages to survive deep in the otherwise inhospitable Sahara Desert. The term originally applied to the land beyond the coastal strip of Africa proconsularis, including the Nafusa and extending west of modern Libya over Ouargla and Illizi. As these Berber areas came to be associated with the regions of Tripoli, Cirta or Algiers, the name was increasingly applied to the arid areas south of Tripolitania.

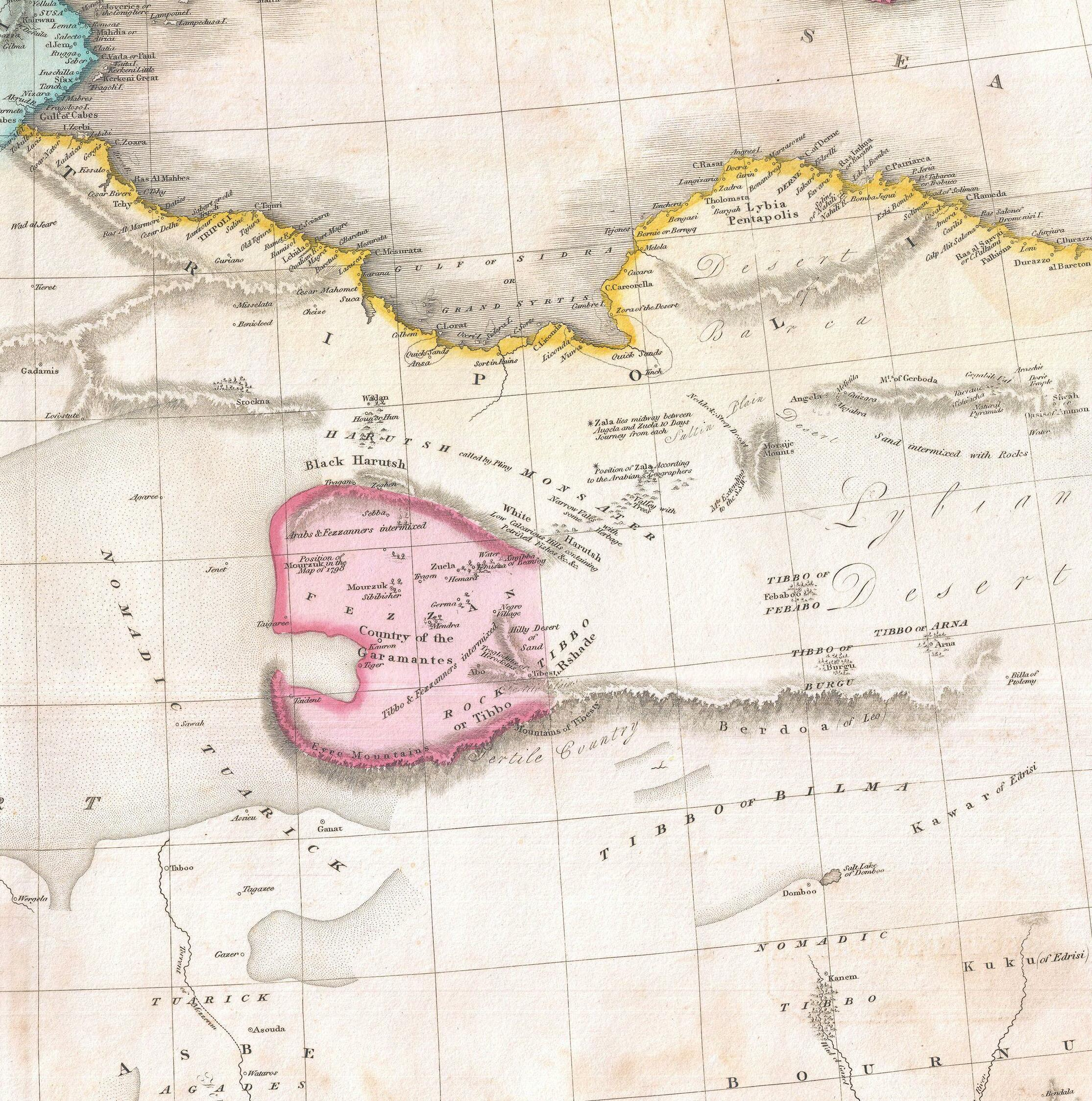
The Fezzan region (shown in pink), at the beginning of the 19th century

After the 1934 formation of Libya, the Fezzan province was designated as one of the three primary provinces of the country, alongside Tripolitania province to the north and Cyrenaica province to the northeast.

== Etymology ==
In Berber languages, Fezzan (or ifezzan) means "rough rocks". Fezzan could also be a derivation from the region's Greek name Phasania or Phazania, which may mean "the country of the pheasants". There are no true pheasants in Libya, but the Barbary partridge, a similar bird, is common.

== Geography ==
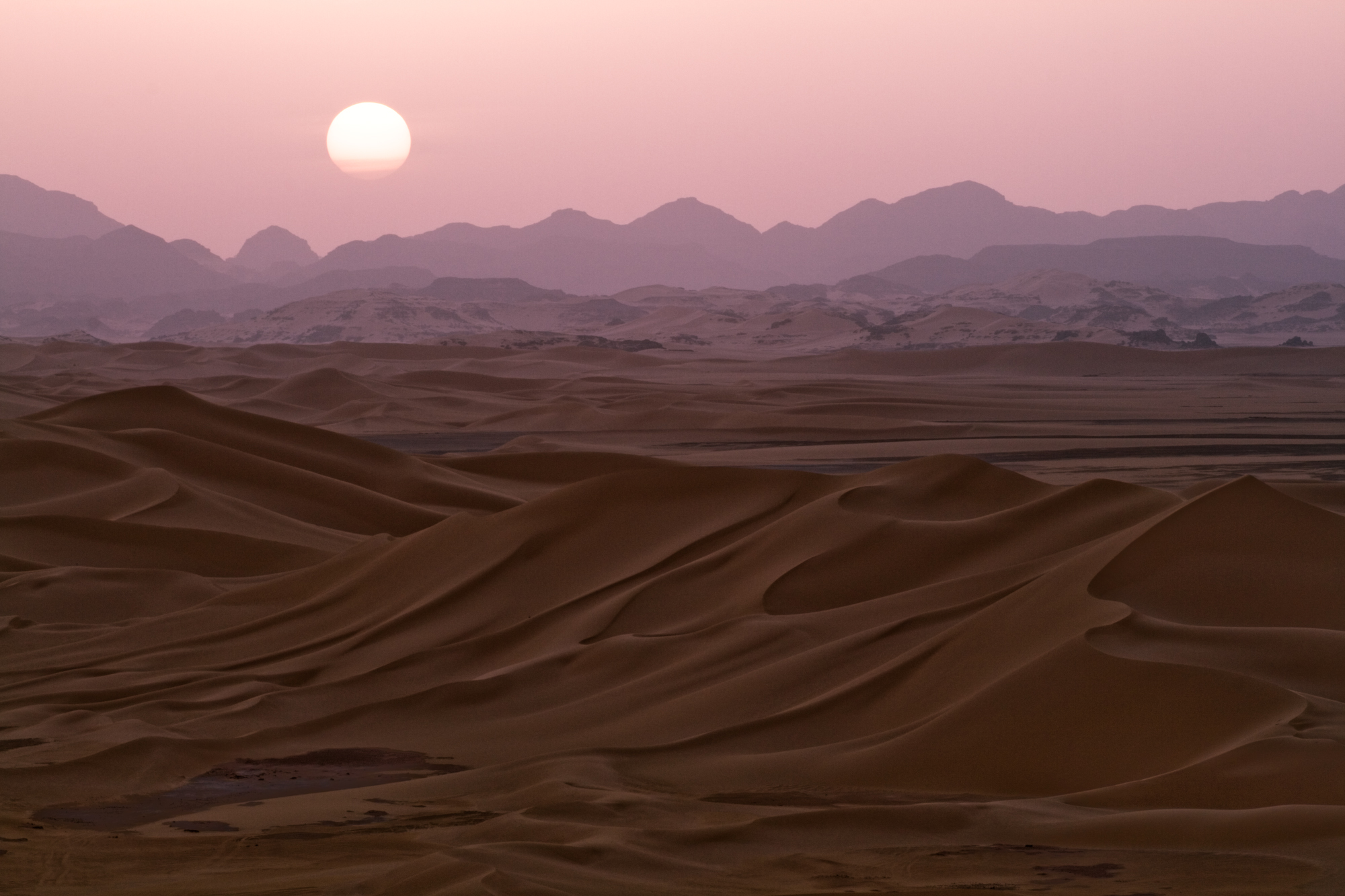
Wan Caza dunes in the Sahara Desert of Fezzan

Fezzan is crossed in the north by the ash-Shati Valley (Wadi Al Shatii) and in the west by the Wadi Irawan. These two areas, along with portions of the Tibesti Mountains crossing the Chadian border and a sprinkling of remote oases and border posts, are the only parts of the Fezzan able to support settled populations. The large dune seas known as ergs of the Idehan Ubari and the Idehan Murzuq cover much of the remaining land of Fezzan.

== History ==
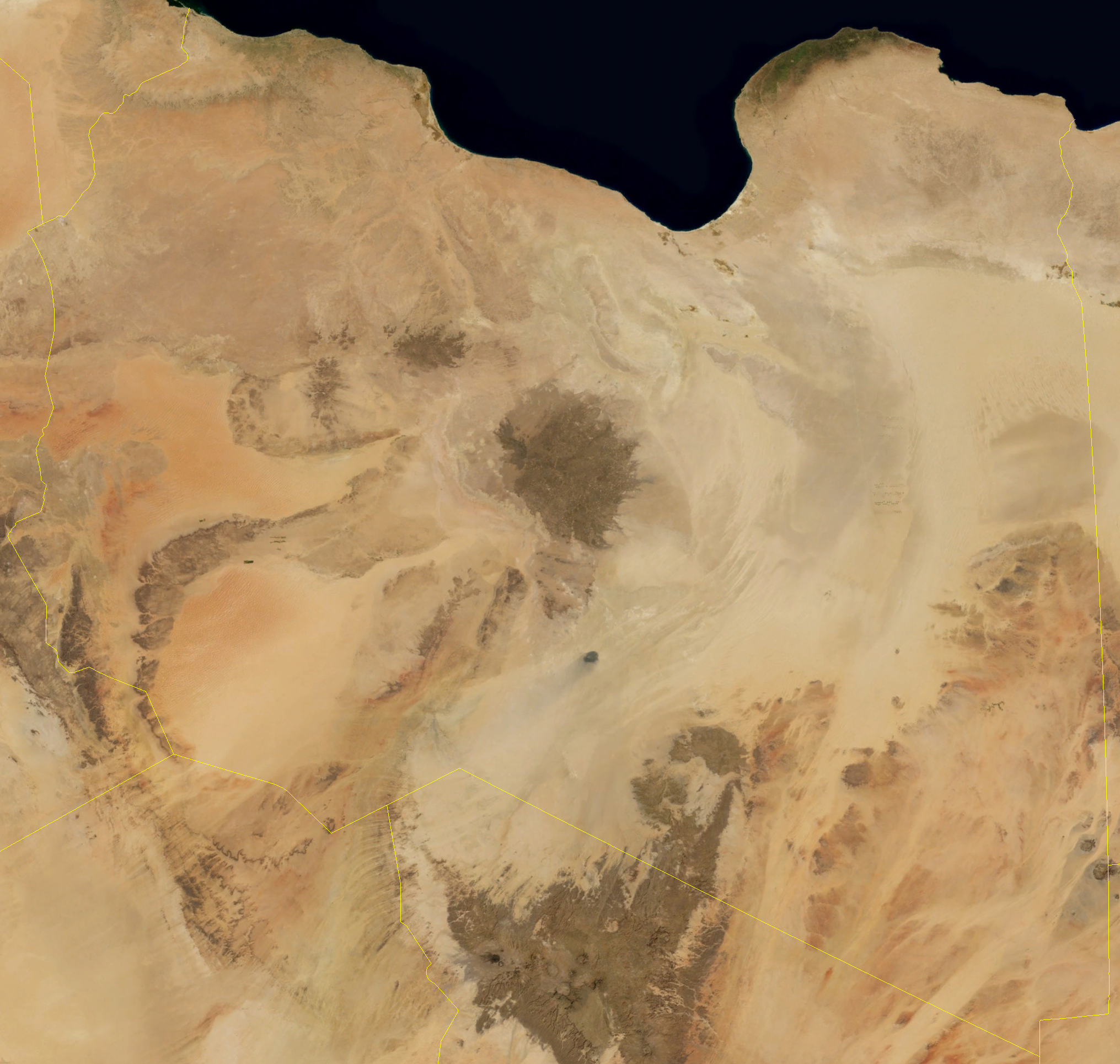
Satellite image of Libya, with Fezzan on the lower left half, showing the large desert

From the 5th century BCE to the 5th century CE, Fezzan was home to the Garamantes, who operated the Trans-Saharan trade routes successively between Carthage and the Roman Empire in North Africa and Sahelian states of west and central Africa.

The Roman generals Septimus Flaccus in 19 BCE and Suetonius Paulinus in 50 CE led small-scale military expeditions into the northern reaches of the Sahara, and the Roman explorer Julius Maternus traveled there in early 1st century CE. Paulinus reached Fezzan and went further south. With the end of the Roman Empire and the following commercial crisis, Fezzan began to lose importance. The population was greatly reduced due to the desertification process of the Sahara during the early Middle Ages.

During the 13th and 14th centuries, the Fezzan became a part of the Kanem Empire, which extended as far as Zella, Libya. Wars against the Kanem–Bornu Empire in the early sixteenth century led to the founding of the Awlad Muhammad dynasty, with Murzuk becoming the capital of Fezzan. Around 1565 it was ruled by Muhammad ibn al-Muntasir. In 1574 Ottoman Tripolitania under Mahmut bey invaded and occupied Fezzan and the Oasis and possibly even reached Lake Chad. From the beginning of the second Ottoman period, the place was run by the Kerdusian of Zawiya, who raided the Kaouar and clashed often with the Senusite over rule of Fezzan. Fezzan had been vassalised since 1574, but only in the 1580s did the rulers of Fezzan give their allegiance to the sultan, but the Turks refrained from trying to exercise any influence there. It was occupied fully from times to time like in 1679-1682, 1690, 1716, 1718 and 1811/1812. The Ottoman rulers of North Africa asserted their control over the region in the 17th century. In the reign of Abdulhamid II (1876–1909) Fezzan was used as a place of political exile for Young Turks because it was the most remote province from Istanbul.

Beginning in 1911, Fezzan was occupied by Italy. However, Italy's control of the region was precarious until at least 1923, with the rise of Benito Mussolini. The Italians were resisted in their early attempts at conquest by tribal Arab adherents to the militant Sanusiyya Sufi religious order. The Tuareg clans of the region were only pacified by European expansion shortly before the Second World War, and some of them collaborated with the Italian Army in the North African Campaign. Free French troops occupied Murzuk, a chief town of Fezzan, on 16 January 1943, and proceeded to administer Fezzan with a staff stationed in Sabha, forming the Fezzan-Ghadames Military Territory. French administration was largely exercised through Fezzan notables of the family of Sayf Al Nasr. Disquieting to the tribes in western Fezzan was the administrative attachment of Ghat, and its surrounding area, to French-ruled Algeria. However, when the French military control ceased in 1951, all of Fezzan became part of the Kingdom of Libya.

Fezzan was a stronghold for Libyan leader Muammar Gaddafi through much of the 2011 Libyan Civil War, though starting in July anti-Gaddafi forces began to gain ground, taking control of the region's largest city of Sabha in mid-to-late September.

The LF country code (.lf) was reserved "on behalf" of Libya Fezzan (for an "indeterminate period of time") by the International Organization for Standardization (ISO).

There are oil wells in Fezzan capable of producing 400,000 barrels per day, but oil companies fly in staff from northern Libya. The local tribes are not getting any money from the oil trade, and so have turned to smuggling migrants from other parts of Africa, which is feeding the European migrant crisis and is a $1 billion per year industry.

== See also ==
- List of colonial heads of Fezzan
- Postage stamps and postal history of Fezzan and Ghadames
- List of French possessions and colonies
- Germa Museum
- Fezzan-Ghadames (French Administration)
- Fazzan Basin
