= ISO 3166-2:LY =

Entry for Libya in ISO 3166-2

ISO 3166-2:LY is the entry for Libya in ISO 3166-2, part of the ISO 3166 standard published by the International Organization for Standardization (ISO), which defines codes for the names of the principal subdivisions (e.g., provinces or states) of all countries coded in ISO 3166-1.

Currently for Libya, ISO 3166-2 codes are defined for 22 popularates.

Each code consists of two parts, separated by a hyphen. The first part is LY, the ISO 3166-1 alpha-2 code of Libya. The second part is two letters.

== Current codes ==
Subdivision names are listed as in the ISO 3166-2 standard published by the ISO 3166 Maintenance Agency (ISO 3166/MA).

Click on the button in the header to sort each column.

Code	Subdivision name (ar) (BGN/PCGN 1956)	Subdivision name (ar) (Note: For reference only, Arabic name in Arabic script not included in the ISO 3166-2 standard.)	Subdivision name (en) (Note: For reference only, English name not included in the ISO 3166-2 standard.)
LY-BU	Al Buţnān	البطنان	Butnan
LY-JA	Al Jabal al Akhḑar	الجبل الأخضر	Green Mountain
LY-JG	Al Jabal al Gharbī	الجبل الغربي	Western Mountain
LY-JI	Al Jafārah	الجفارة	Jafara
LY-JU	Al Jufrah	الجفرة	Jufra
LY-KF	Al Kufrah	الكفرة	Kufra
LY-MJ	Al Marj	المرج	Meadows
LY-MB	Al Marqab	المرقب	Murqub
LY-WA	Al Wāḩāt	الواحات	Oases
LY-NQ	An Nuqāţ al Khams	النقاط الخمس	Nuqat al Khams
LY-ZA	Az Zāwiyah	الزاوية	Zawiya
LY-BA	Banghāzī	بنغازي	Benghazi
LY-DR	Darnah	درنة	Derna
LY-GT	Ghāt	غات	Ghat
LY-MI	Mişrātah	مصراته	Misrata
LY-MQ	Murzuq	مرزق	Murzuq
LY-NL	Nālūt	نالوت	Nalut
LY-SB	Sabhā	سبها	Sabha
LY-SR	Surt	سرت	Sirte
LY-TB	Ţarābulus	طرابلس	Tripoli
LY-WD	Wādī al Ḩayāt	وادي الحياة	Wadi al Hayaa
LY-WS	Wādī ash Shāţi’	وادي الشاطئ	Wadi ash Shati

== Changes ==
The following changes to the entry have been announced in newsletters by the ISO 3166/MA since the first publication of ISO 3166-2 in 1998. ISO stopped issuing newsletters in 2013.

Newsletter	Date issued	Description of change in newsletter	Code/Subdivision change
Newsletter I-5	2003-09-05	Revision of subdivision layout. Revision of header information	Subdivision layout: 13 municipalities (see below) → 34 municipalities
Newsletter II-2	2010-06-30	Update of the administrative structure and of the list source	Subdivision layout: 34 municipalities (see below) → 22 popularates

The following changes to the entry are listed on ISO's online catalogue, the Online Browsing Platform:

Effective date of change	Short description of change (en)
2014-12-18	Alignment of the French short name lower case with UNTERM
2011-11-08	Name change
2010-06-30	Update of the administrative structure and of the list source

=== Codes before Newsletter I-5 ===
Former code	Subdivision name
LY-BU	Al Buţnān
LY-JA	Al Jabal al Akhḑar
LY-JG	Al Jabal al Gharbī
LY-JU	Al Jufrah
LY-WA	Al Wāḩah
LY-WU	Al Wusţá
LY-ZA	Az Zāwiyah
LY-BA	Banghāzī
LY-FA	Fazzān
LY-MI	Mişrātah
LY-NA	Naggaza
LY-SF	Sawfajjin
LY-TB	Ţarābulus

=== Codes before Newsletter II-2 ===
Former code	Subdivision name
LY-AJ	Ajdābiyā
LY-BU	Al Buţnān
LY-HZ	Al Ḩizām al Akhḑar
LY-JA	Al Jabal al Akhḑar
LY-JI	Al Jifārah
LY-JU	Al Jufrah
LY-KF	Al Kufrah
LY-MJ	Al Marj
LY-MB	Al Marqab
LY-QT	Al Qaţrūn
LY-QB	Al Qubbah
LY-WA	Al Wāḩah
LY-NQ	An Nuqaţ al Khams
LY-SH	Ash Shāţi'
LY-ZA	Az Zāwiyah
LY-BA	Banghāzī
LY-BW	Banī Walīd
LY-DR	Darnah
LY-GD	Ghadāmis
LY-GR	Gharyān
LY-GT	Ghāt
LY-JB	Jaghbūb
LY-MI	Mişrātah
LY-MZ	Mizdah
LY-MQ	Murzuq
LY-NL	Nālūt
LY-SB	Sabhā
LY-SS	Şabrātah Şurmān
LY-SR	Surt
LY-TN	Tājūrā' wa an Nawāḩī al Arbāʻ
LY-TB	Ţarābulus
LY-TM	Tarhūnah-Masallātah
LY-WD	Wādī al Ḩayāt
LY-YJ	Yafran-Jādū

== See also ==
- Subdivisions of Libya
- FIPS region codes of Libya
- Neighbouring countries: DZ, EG, NE, SD, TD, TN
