= Janzur =

Growing coastal Libyan city

Janzour جَنْزُور Zanzur
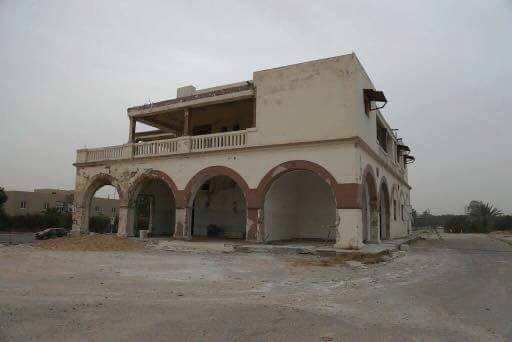

- Location within Libya
- Coordinates: 32°49′02″N 13°00′40″E
- Country: Libya
- Muhafazah: Tripoli District
- Baladiyah: Janzour
- First settled: 6th century BC

Government
  - Governing body: Janzour Municipal Council
- Elevation: 2–60 m (6.6–196.9 ft)

Population (2006)
  - Total: 88,073
- Time zone: UTC+1 (CET)
  - Summer (DST): UTC+2 (CEST)
- License Plate Code: 34

Janzur or Janzour /ˈdʒɑːnzʊər/ (Arabic: جَنْزُور Janzūr), also known as Zanzur, is a city in north-western Libya, situated on the Libyan coastline of the Mediterranean Sea, located in the west of the capital Tripoli, and East of Az-Zawiya. Residents of this city are called Janazrah (plural of Janzouri-one who is from Janzour).

Janzour consists of Eight major areas, namely Janzour As-Souq (جنزور السوق) and Janzour Al-Garbiyah (جنزور الغربية) and Janzour Ash-Sharqiya (جنزور الشرقية) and Janzour Al-wasat (جنزور الوسط) and AL-Gheiran (الغيران) and An-Njila (النجيلة) and As-Sayad (الصياد) and Alhachan (الحشان).

Janzour is becoming a highly urban area, as new hospitals, schools, and roads are being built. Right now, it is home to many significant institutions, including the Libyan Academy, University of Tripoli: Faculty of Arts, School of Medicine, Engineering and Vocational Colleges among others.

== History ==
=== Naming and population ===
Indigenous peoples are Mejres (مجريس) and Tasa (تاسا), They are sons of one father claims Wkhian (وخيعن), from the tribe of Houara, but today the city is considered far from tribalism, and mixed from several origins of Houara of sons of Gharyan and Mslath, Misrata and Tarhona and Orfeila, and the families of the tribe of Nafusa and the families of tribe of Zanata, and Arabs of Banu Dabbab.

Janzur is derived from the Latin word "Censor" (In old Latin, C pronounce, such as G, like Greek the ancestor of Latin, which C correspond to Γ (third letter), which Greek is derived from the Phoenician and Phoenician use abjad system (ABCD HWZ...)).

=== Historical overview ===
On March 6, 1912, the Italian forces became the first to use airships in war, as two dirigibles dropped bombs on Turkish troops and Libyan Mujahideen encamped at Janzour, from an altitude of 6,000 feet.

There was still a Jewish presence in Zanzur at the end of World War II at which time a local synagogue was burned down and Jews killed during a pogrom.

Janzour became a Baladiyah that followed the Greater Tripoli Muhafazah, Janzur was part of Jafara District since 2001. Before that it was part of Zawiya District in 1998 and Before that it was part of Tripoli District in 1995 and Before that it was part of Tarabulus Baladiyah in 1987 and Before that it was part of Janzour Baladiyah in 1983.

== Administrative divisions ==
Janzour is currently a municipality affiliated with the Tripoli governorate. While there is a state of administrative division, with Al-Najilah subordinating to the municipality of Janzour or the municipality of Al-Sawani, and some of the eastern regions of Janzour belong to the municipality of Hay Al-Andalus, such as Al-Sarraj Al-Sharqiya.

Historically, areas such as Al-Sawani, Al-Mayah, Hay Al-Andalus, Ghout Al-Shaal, and Qarqarash were part of Janzour, where Tajoura, Tripoli, Qasr bin Ghashir, and Janzour formed what is known as Greater Tripoli.

In the Kingdom of Libya, Janzour belonged to the governorate (muhafazah) of Tripoli, and in 1983 Janzour became a municipality. It then became affiliated to the municipality of Tripoli in 1987, after which it became affiliated to the Tripoli district in 1995. Janzour became affiliated to the district of Zawiya in 1998, and then in 2001 it became affiliated to the district of Al-Jafara.

During the Ottoman era, Janzour was a district belonging to the Sanjak of Tripoli in the west, in the Eyalet of Tripoli in the west. As for the western regions of Janzour, such as Maya, Al-Tubiya, and others, they constituted a sub-district of the district. In the year 1862, the district was dissolved into the two sub-districts of Janzour and the Al-Aziziya sub-district, which were affiliated with the West Tripoli district. Al-Aziziyah sub-district became a district by 1904.

== Agriculture ==
The area is of great agricultural value because of the winter rain and the mild weather. The palm and olive trees, as well as orange trees used to be widespread in the city; however, due to urban planning, and the dramatic increase of human settlement, a lot of these trees disappeared especially the orange trees.

== See also ==
- Italo-Turkish War
