= Yafran District =

Former district of Libya

Coordinates: 32°04′N 12°32′E

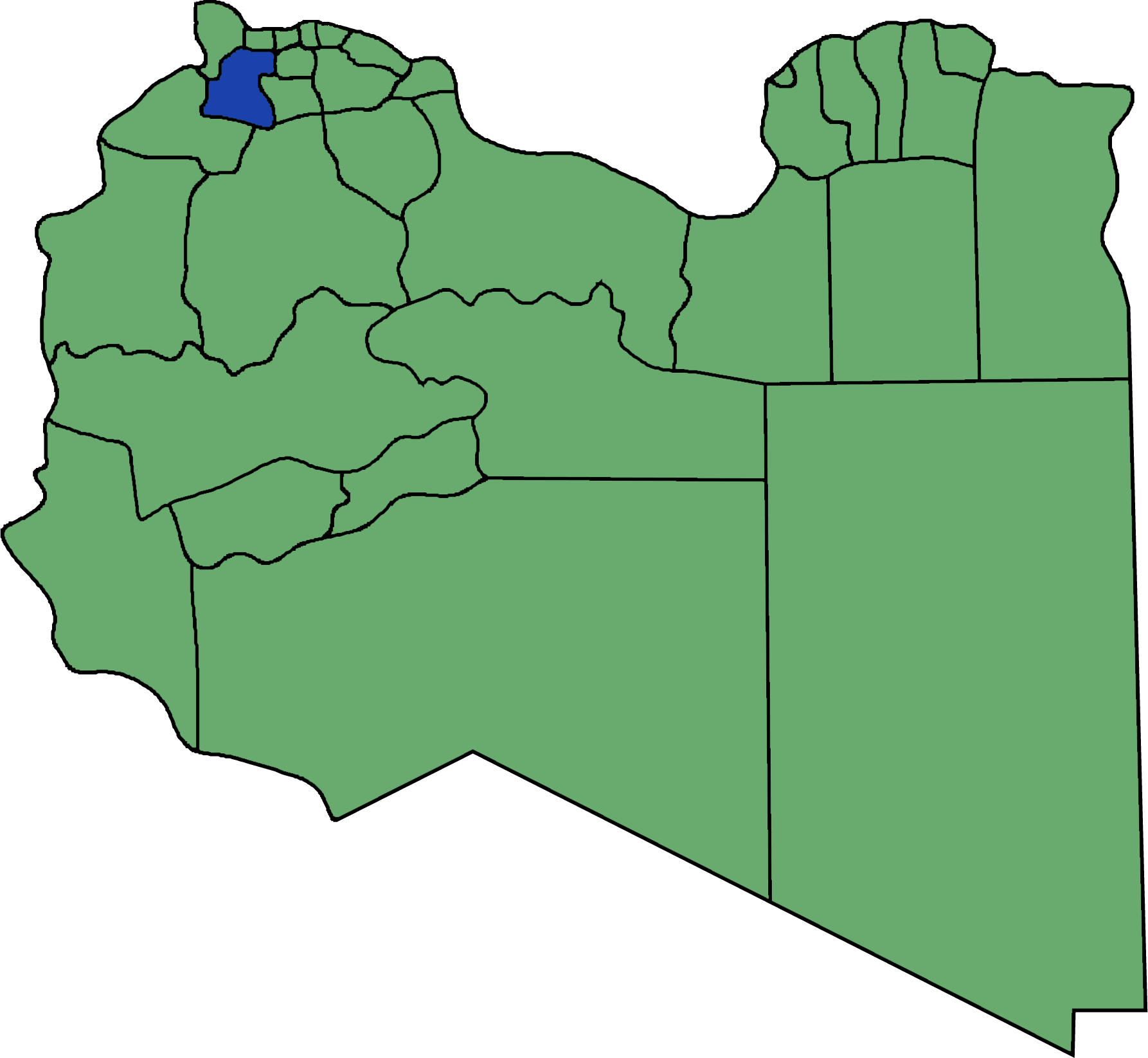

Yafran or Yifren (Arabic: يفرن) is one of the districts of Libya (baladiyat). It is located in the northwest part of the country and its capital is Yafran. Between the 2007 reorganization of districts and the 2013 reorganization, most of its territory was part of Jabal al Gharbi District, although the southwestern part was in Nalut District. In 2013, its territory was placed in Nafusa Mountains District. However, by 2015, it had been restored as a district.

== Boundaries ==
- From 2001 to 2007, Yafran bordered the following districts:
  - Sabratha wa Sorman - north;
  - Zawiya - northeast, at a quadripoint;
  - Jafara - northeast;
  - Gharyan - east;
  - Mizda - southeast;
  - Nalut - southwest; and
  - Nuqat al Khams - northwest.
- There is not accord on the boundaries of Yafran District between 1995 and 2001.
- From 1983 to 1995, Yafran bordered the following districts:
  - Nuqat al Khams - northwest;
  - Zawiya - north;
  - Gharyan - east and south; and
  - Ghadames - south and west.
