= Msallata =

Msallata مسلاتة Al Qasabat
- Town
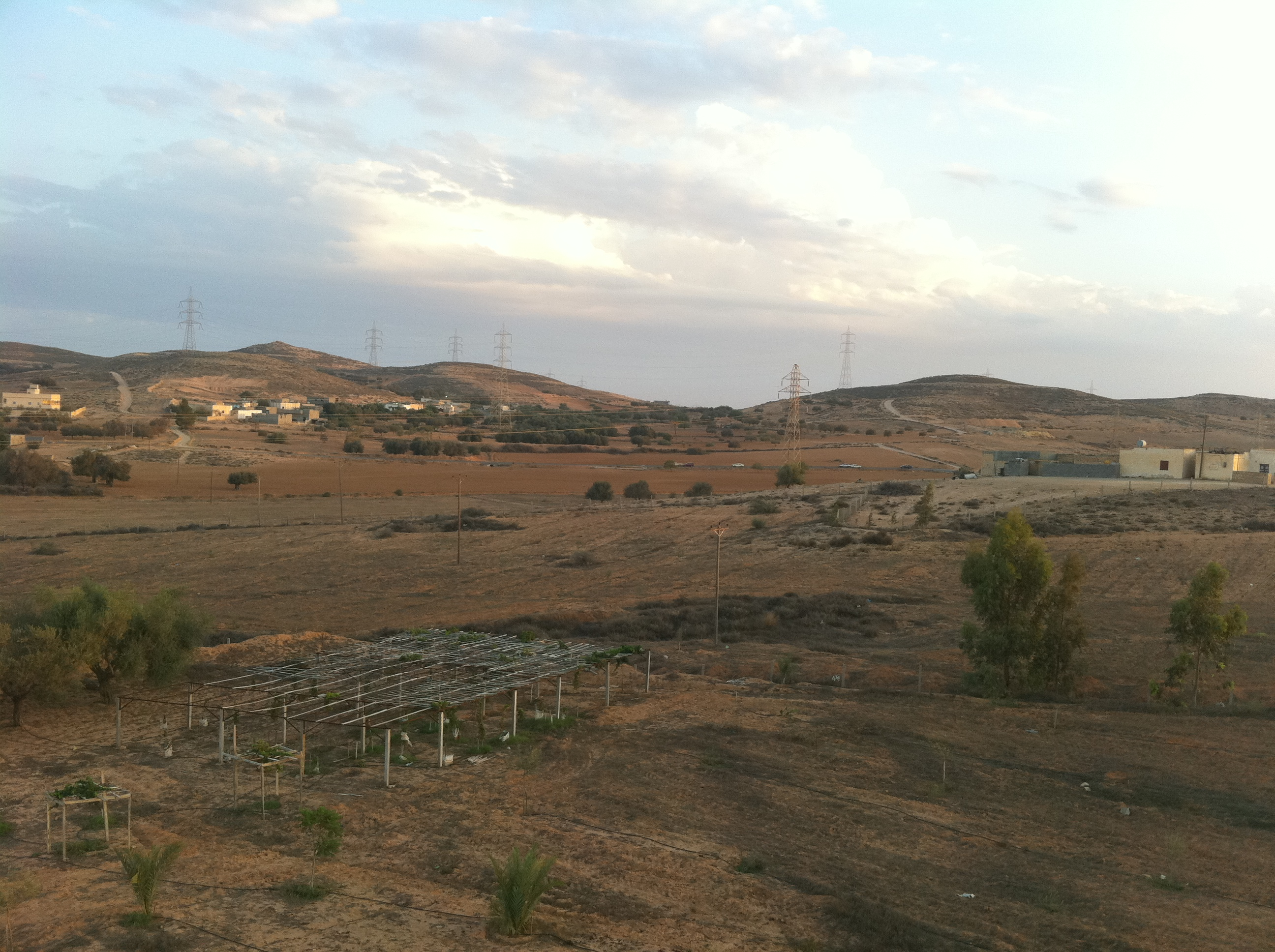

- Location in Libya
- Coordinates: 32°34′56″N 14°02′24″E
- Country: Libya
- Region: Tripolitania
- District: Murqub
- Highest elevation: 684 m (2,244 ft)
- Lowest elevation: 296 m (971 ft)

Population (2004)
  - Total: 80,000
- Time zone: UTC+2 (EET)
- License Plate Code: 44

Msallata (also Al Qasabat, Cussabat and El-Gusbát) is a town in the northwestern part of Libya, in the Murqub District. It has a population of nearly 24,000, and was historically a center of Islamic studies. It is also known for having very wet winters, olive tree farming and olive oil production. The Tripolian Republic was announced in Msallata on 16 November 1918 which was the first republic in the Arab world. Along with the city of Tarhuna, it gave its name to the former Libyan district of Tarhuna wa Msalata.

== Etymology ==
There has not been any research on the etymology of the name Msallata, but there is some speculation as to its origins. One theory is that the name comes from the plural of the Arabic word for obelisk masalla which is masallat, because the city is the home of 22 tall buildings called qasaba. Others speculate that the name comes from the Arabic word salt (scrubbing), which also has the more specific meaning of 'scrubbing olive from its tree', with the M at the beginning being a variant of the Himyarite definite article am-. Supporters of this argument mention that Msallata is famous for its olive production. However, none of these claims have been scientifically substantiated.

== History ==
The history of the city dates back to the Roman Ages where it was mentioned as Misfe, a station between Leptis Magna and Tarhunah. At the end of the First World War, the agreement on establishing the Tripolitanian Republic was signed in the city on November 16, 1918.

Anti-Jewish riots erupted in Tripolitania, then part of British-administered Libya, in November 1945 against the backdrop of general economic difficulties, and in al-Kusbat, many Jews converted to Islam to protect themselves from being massacred.

Jewish refugees from Msallata founded Ahisamakh, Israel, in 1950.

== People ==
Most residents of Msallata are not originally from the city, but from other cities. People in Mssallata are conservative and observant of Islamic laws, as in most Libyan cities. In a recent official census, Msallata has a population of 79,709.

== Administrative divisions ==
Msallata is divided into the districts of Qasabath, Cendara, Wadnah, Banilathe, Zafran, Algaleel, Elwatah, Akasha, Al-Hadirat, Al-Shafeen, Zawiyat as-Samah, Banimeslem, Gereem, Ghrarat, Mrad, Al-Swadnyah and Al-Zarruq.

The city was a part of Al-Mergheb Governorate, but after the uprising in Libya, it became an independent governorate. The telephone code of the city is 053.

== Economy ==
The economy of the city depends mainly on cultivating olive, wheat, and barley. There are as many as 19 olive mills in the city. In addition, herding sheep and goats is an important economic activity. Furthermore, there is a manufacture of cement.

== Education and culture ==
The city has a branch of Almergheb University of Arts, a medical technical school, a religious sciences college, and an engineering faculty. In addition, Msalata is home to many Islamic schools, such as Zawiyat Al-Jourani, Mejabra Mosque, Zawiyat Al-Dokaly. It is also a destination for many Libyan and Sub-Saharan students who seek to learn the Quran.

== During the 2011 civil war ==
Reuters reported clashes in Msallata on 3 August, in which three people were killed. By 5 August, AFP was reporting that the town, whose residents had joined the rebellion in its early stages, had come under siege. Government troops controlled the roads leading into the town, had cut off electricity and communications and had begun arresting people in the suburbs.

== See also ==
- List of cities in Libya
- Tarhuna District
- Tarhuna wa Msalata District
