= Gheddahia =

Al Qaddāḩīyah Gheddahia, El Gheddahia, El Ghadenia, Qaryat al Qaddahiyah
- Town
- Location in Libya
- Coordinates: 31°22′04″N 015°13′37″E
- Country: Libya
- Region: Tripolitania
- District: Misrata District
- Elevation: 30 m (98 ft)
- Time zone: UTC+2 (EET)

Al Qaddāḩīyah (Gheddahia, Arabic: القداحية) is a town in the Misrata District in northeastern Libya. It is about 7 km south of the Libyan Coastal Highway (Via Balbia), between the cities of Sirte and Misrata.

From independence in 1951 to 1983 Al Qaddahiyah was part of the Misrata Governorate. From 1987 to 1995 it was part of the Sawfajjin baladiyah. From 1995 to 2001 it is unclear which district administered Al Qaddahiyah. It was part of the revised Sirte District from 2001 to 2007, but was incorporated into the enlarged Misrata District in 2007.

On 18 May 1914 a severe earthquake near Gheddahia resulted in the complete destruction of the fort there. The quake was recorded by numerous European seismic stations. Even stronger was the earthquake of 19 April 1935 (magnitude: 7.0).
