= Qirdah =

Settlement in Libya

Coordinates: 30°58′N 14°34′E

Misrata district displayed on a map.

Qirdah is a town located in north west Libya, in the Sawfajjin Municipality which is located in the Tripolitania Region, and Misrata District. Qirdah is roughly 45 km away from the Libyan Coastal Highway. Qirdah may also be subjected to the confluence of intermittent run-off from the Mediterranean, which may occur in colder months. The nearest major city is Abugrein, around 45 km away. Within Qirdah there are two main sites of interest, the ancient city of Gerisa, and Al-Tahweed Mosque (Arabic: مسجد التوحيد).

Coordinates: 30°57'01.6"N 14°34'02.8"E
Country	Libya
Region	Tripolitania
District	Misrata District
Elevation	164 m (538 ft)
Time zone	UTC+2 (EET)
Climate	Refer to NOAA
