= Al Khums District =

Coordinates: 32°39′N 14°16′E

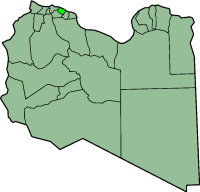
Map showing municipality

Al Khums or Khoms District (Arabic: الخمس) was a district of Libya from 1983 to 1995. It was in the northwest area of Libya, bordering the Mediterranean Sea. Its capital was Khoms. The area now is the Murqub District.

It is notable for the ancient Roman city of Leptis Magna, which is 120 km (74.5 mi) east of Tripoli along the coast. Leptis Magna prospered for 500 years, reaching its peak under the patronage of Emperor Septimius Severus aka "the Grim African".

== Transport ==
In 2007, construction of the new Libyan railways was proceeding in this area.

== Industry ==
Walterbau of Germany is building a concrete sleeper plant.

There is the National Cement Company and it has two factories

The city is also classified as an industrial city, as it has a plastic factory and cement brick and concrete factories. It is also distinguished by its maintenance. Maintenance workshops and used spare parts

There is also the largest power station on the coast of Libya
