= ʽAziziya District =

Coordinates: 32°31′48″N 013°00′36″E

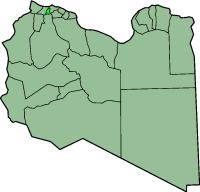
Map of Libya showing pre-2001 extent of ʽAziziya in bright green

ʽAziziya or El Azizia (Arabic: العزيزيه Al ʿAzīzīyah) was one of the districts of Libya (baladiyah), located in the northwest of the country, south of Tripoli District. The town of ʽAziziya was the former district's capital, and it covered an area of 1,940 square kilometers. In 2001 ʽAziziya became part of the Jafara District.

== Climate ==
On 13 September 1922, a temperature of 58 °C (136.4 °F) was recorded in the city of ‘Aziziya. This was long believed to be the highest temperature ever to be recorded naturally on Earth.

Meteorological parameters began to be recorded in Libya during the Ottoman Empire (1551–1911). Temperature archives for some old meteorological stations are available in the climate directorate at the Libyan National Meteorological Centre (LNMC).

== Towns ==
Towns in the former ‘Aziziya District:

- ‘Aziziya, capital of ‘Aziziya District until 2001
- Funduq ash Shaybani, 17 km on the trade route south of the city of ‘Aziziya
- Abu Ghaylan, 13 km on the trade route south of Funduq ash Shaybani
- An Nasiriyah, 18 km northwest of the city of ‘Aziziya
- As Sawani, 21 km north of the city of ‘Aziziya, on the road to Tripoli, and former storage site of Libya's modular "Uranium Conversion Facility" and uranium separation centrifuge.
- Asbi`ah, 14 km east of the city of ‘Aziziya and 15 km south of Tripoli International Airport
- Sawani Bin Adam, 1 km east of As Sawani
