= Tajura wa Arbaʽ District =

Former district of Libya

Coordinates: 32°45′N 13°30′E

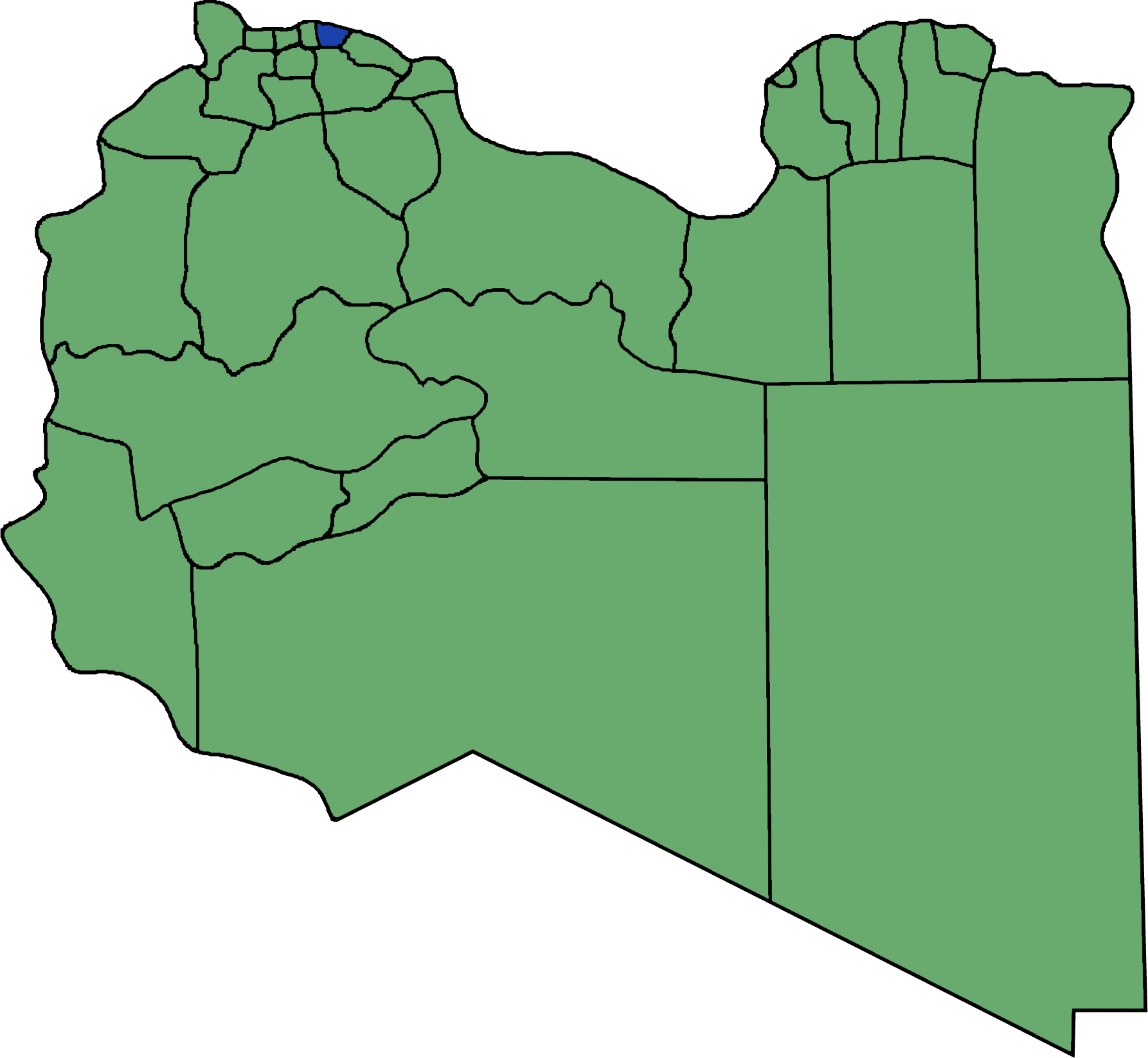
Tajura Wa Al Nawahi Al Arbaʽ District, 2001-2007

Tajura wa Arbaʽ (Arabic: تاجوراء والنواحي الأربع, romanized: Tajūrāʾ wa an-Nawājī al-ʾArbaʿ) was one of the districts of Libya from 2001 to 2007. It consisted of eleven Basic People's Congresses, similar to townships, and its capital was Tajura. In the 2007 administrative reorganization the territory formerly in Tajura Wa Al Nawahi Al Arbaʽ was transferred to the Tripoli District (Tarabulus District).

In the north, Tajura wa Arbaʽ had a shoreline on the Mediterranean Sea. On land, it bordered the following districts:

- Murqub (المرقب) - to the east
- Tarhuna wa Msalata (ترهونة ومسلاته) - to the south
- Tripoli (طربلس) - to the west
