= Mohamed Al-Zawawi =

Libyan cartoonist

- Born: 1936; Benghazi
- Died: 5 June 2011 (aged 74–75); Tripoli
- Occupation: cartoonist

Mohamed Mohamed Al-Zawawi Al-Tarhuni (Arabic: محمد الزواوي) (1936–2011) was a Libyan satirical artist and cartoonist.

== Biography ==
Al-Zawawi was born in the suburbs of Benghazi in 1936. He studied at Abyar Boarding School until the fourth grade. Due to family circumstances, he had to leave school and worked as an illustrator in the audiovisual department of the American Joint Services Point Four Program.

In 1963, he was appointed to work at Al-Idha'a magazine in Tripoli as a journalist and illustrator, where he published his first satirical cartoon. He later moved to Al-Mar'a magazine as a director and illustrator, while also contributing cartoons to most of the newspapers published in the country. After 1969 in Libya, he continued his work in Al-Thawra newspaper. He subsequently worked as an illustrator for Al-Usbu' Al-Siyasi, Al-Jamahiriya, and Al-Zahf Al-Akhdar newspapers.

His cartoons appeared in several Libyan newspapers, the last of which was the weekly Al-Sabah Ouyah, which was suspended by the Libyan Popular Committees at the end of 2010 due to his criticism of the political regime. The newspaper later resumed publication under a new editor, which was considered by some as a falsified version, after which he stopped contributing to it.

He also ventured into animation, producing works totaling over 50 minutes in duration, and held numerous exhibitions both locally and internationally.

== Death ==
The prominent Libyan cartoonist Mohamed Al-Zawawi died on Sunday, 5 June 2011, in Tripoli, Libya, at the age of 76, due to a heart attack.
