= Tarhuna wa Msalata District =

Former district of Libya

Coordinates: 32.65°N 13.5833°E

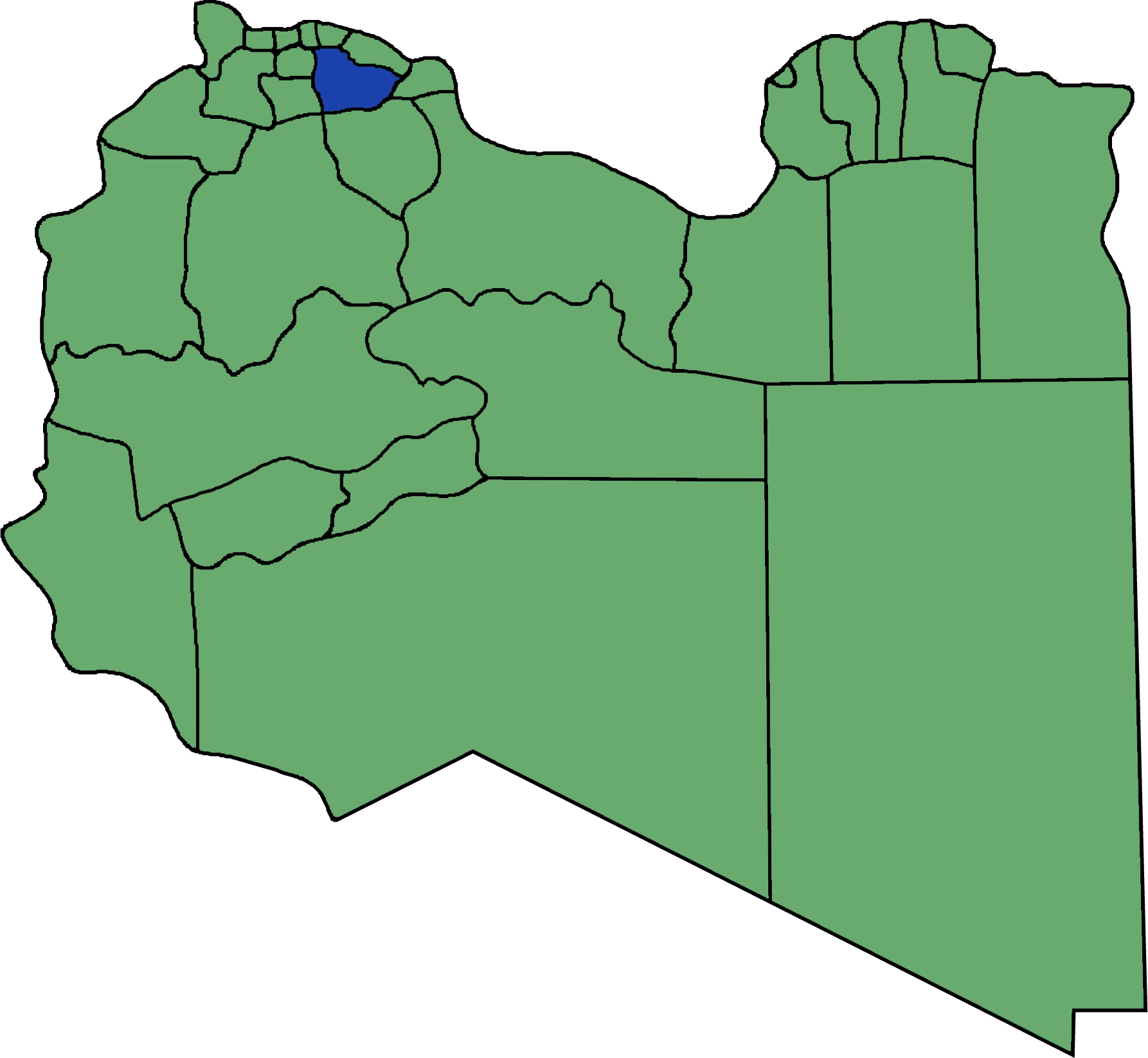
Pre-2007 extent of Tarhuna wa Msalata District

Tarhuna wa Msalata (Tarhuna and Msallata) was a district of Libya until 2007. Between 1988 and 1995 there existed the Tarhuna District, which became Tarhuna wa Msalata between 2001 and 2007. It consisted of twenty-six Basic People's Congresses, similar to townships, and its capital was Tarhuna. In the 2007 administrative reorganization, the territory formerly in Tarhuna wa Msalata was transferred to Murqub District.

Tarhuna was one of the leading resistance centres (with Misrata) to the Italian occupation of 1911.

== Borders ==
Prior to 2007, Tarhuna wa Msalata bordered the following districts:

- Tajura wa Arbaʽ - north
- Murqub - northeast
- Misrata - east
- Bani Walid - south
- Mizda - southwest, at a quadripoint
- Gharyan - southwest
- Jafara - west
- Tripoli - northwest

== History ==
=== Early history ===
There are many archaeological remains in the Tarhuna region. However, these remains are extremely dispersed over most parts of the plateau, as is always in the case of hinterland of any significant ancient city. Another interesting point is that the Jebel Tarhuna was a boundary land between two important ancient coastal centres, Leptis Magna and Oea. It is possible that this ancient reality may be reflected in settlement patterning. For Leptis Magna, like many other cities in the Roman world, the city was an integral part with its surrounding territory and its hinterland. Not all resources and items needed at the city could be obtained locally and from an early date Leptis Magna imported artefacts and other goods from through the Mediterranean. Certainly, these artifacts and goods must be spread in the countryside and were not only distributed at the urban centre.

The archaeological sites of the Tarhuna region were first reported in the nineteenth century by Heinrich Barth and Edwin Von Bary, who visited them in 1849 and 1875 respectively. Both these pioneers gave a summary description of some ancient sites on the plateau, which attracted attention of the late nineteenth and early twentieth century’s travellers and scholars. During the years 1895-6 H. Swainson Cowper visited the Tarhuna plateau and examined in considerable detail more than eighty ancient sites (Cowper 1897). Although he interpreted these sites as prehistoric monuments of religious character (Senams), his work constitutes a significant pioneer survey. It brought to light the archaeological importance of the Tarhuna region as a zone of intensive olive-cultivation during the classical period. Tarhuna Gebel was the area partly surveyed by Goodchild (1951), who had examined a number of ancient sites, specially his excavation in the sanctuary of Ammon at Ras El-Haddagia, and the villa and pottery-kilns at Ain Scersciara (Goodchild 1951: 43-77).

At the same time (1949-51) Oates carried out much comprehensive archaeological survey in the area over some 300 square kilometres around Gas red-Daun at the eastern part of the Tarhuna Plateau. By three seasons of work, he revealed a distribution of more than 100 sites, which chronologically extended from the first century to the fifth century AD (Oates 1953). During the mid-nineteenth century, the first century BCE pottery was little-known. However, the Oates’ sites consist for the most part of varying size of farms associated with their water control and supply works, which represent the key to their regional specialization.

=== Islamic era ===
Arab migration:

The Ottoman conquest started in the 1530s and the area remained under their rule until 1911.

Maltese exile: In 1551, after the order of Suleiman I, Dragut, a prominent Turkish corsair, conquered Gozo and enslaved all 5,000-6,000 of its inhabitants, bringing them to Tarhuna.

=== European colonialism ===
- Battle of El-Shqiqa: a memorial of the battle was erected on the site of the execution of its hero Ali Swidan Alhatmy in the city centre of Tarhuna, just opposite the Tarhuna mosque.
- Battle of El-Akwam
- Battle of El-Boirat

== See also ==
- Tarhuna District
- Tarhuna
- Msallata
