= Bani Walid District =

Former district of Libya

Coordinates: 31°20′N 14°35′E

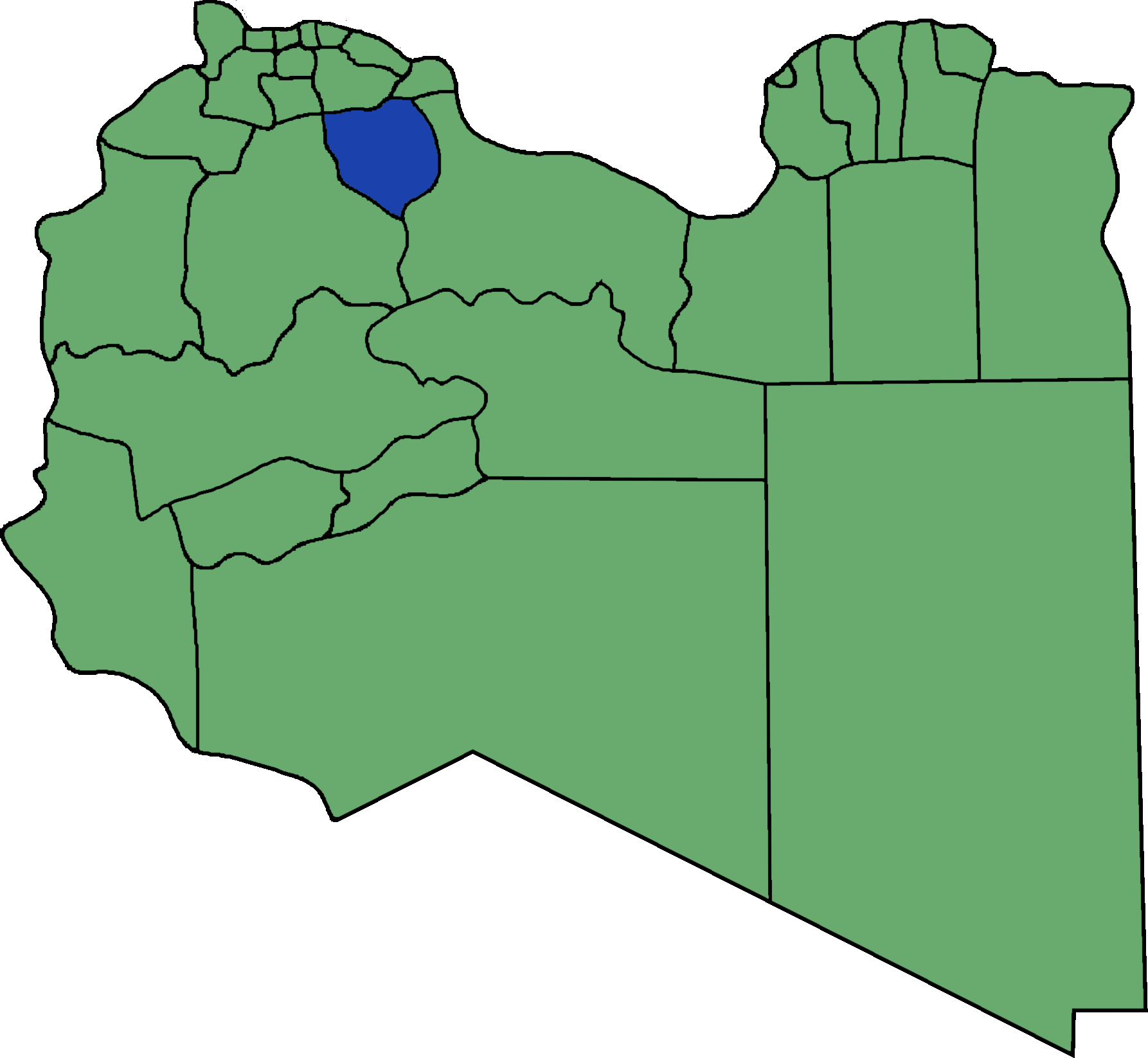
Pre-2007 extent of Bani Walid District

Bani Walid or Ben Walid, prior to 2007, was one of the districts of Libya, administrative town Bani Walid. In the 2007 administrative reorganization the territory formerly in Bani Walid District was transferred to Misrata District.

Bani Walid bordered the following districts:

- Tarhuna wa Msalata - north
- Misrata - northeast
- Sirte - east
- Mizda - west
- Gharyan - northwest, at a quadripoint
