= Abyar, Libya =

Abyar الأبيار El Abiar
- Town
- Location in Libya
- Coordinates: 32°11′20″N 20°35′48″E
- Country: Libya
- Region: Cyrenaica
- District: Marj
- Elevation: 278 m (912 ft)

Population (2010)
  - Total: 32,563
- Time zone: UTC+2 (EET)
- License Plate Code: 30

Abyar (al-Abyā) (Arabic: الأبيار Al Abyār) is a town in the Marj District, in northeastern Libya, roughly 50 km to the east of the city of Benghazi and 42 km southwest of the city of Marj. As of 2010, its estimated population was 32,563.

== History ==
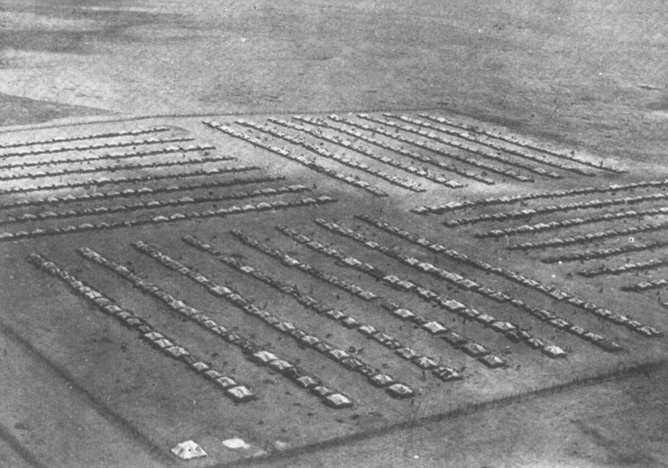
Italian concentration camp at Abyar

The town is the site of a former Italian concentration camp for the nomadic tribes that lived in Eastern Libya (Cyrenaica), and for those in the Libyan resistance movement, during the Italian colonial period. Prior to 2007, it was the capital of the district of Hizam al Akhdar.

== See also ==
- List of cities in Libya
