= Districts of Libya =

In Libya there are currently 22 districts, further subdivided into second level administrative subdivisions known as municipalities, or in Arabic as baladiyat (singular baladiyah), the number of which has varied since 2013 between 99 and 108. The first level administrative divisions in Libya are currently the governorates (muhafazat), which have yet to be formally delineated, but which were originally tripartite as: Tripolitania in the northwest, Cyrenaica in the east, and Fezzan in the southwest; and later divided into ten governorates.

Between the years of 1995 and 2007 there were 13 - 32 first level administrative subdivisions known by the term shabiyah (Arabic singular شعبية šaʿbiyya, plural šaʿbiyyāt) which constituted the districts of Libya. In the 1990s the shabiyat had replaced an older baladiyat system.

Historically the area of Libya was considered three provinces (or states), Tripolitania in the northwest, Cyrenaica in the east, and Fezzan in the southwest. It was the conquest by Italy in the Italo-Turkish War that united them in a single political unit. Under the Italians Libya was eventually divided into four provinces and one territory: Tripoli, Misrata, Benghazi, Derna, (in the north) and the Territory of the Libyan Sahara (in the south). After the French and British occupied Libya in 1943, it was again split into three provinces: Tripolitania in the northwest, Cyrenaica in the east, and Fezzan-Ghadames in the southwest.

Article 176 of the 1951 constitution of Libya stated "The Kingdom of Libya shall be divided into administrative units in conformity with the law to be promulgated in this connection. Local and regional councils may be formed in the Kingdom. The extent of these units shall be determined by law which shall likewise organize these Councils." in exact quote.

After independence (1951), Libya was divided into three governorates (muhafazat), matching the three provinces of before, but in 1963 it was divided into ten governorates. In 1983 a new system was introduced dividing the country into forty-six districts (baladiyat). In 1987 this was reduced to twenty-five districts.

On 2 August 1995, Libya reorganized into thirteen districts (shabiyat). In 1998 this was increased to 26 shabiyat districts. In 2001 it was increased to thirty-two districts plus three administrative regions. Finally in 2007 it was reduced to twenty-two districts.

For historical evolution see also: Subdivisions of Libya.

Libyan districts were further subdivided into Basic People's Congresses which act as townships or boroughs until 2011.

== Etymology ==
The term شعبية in Arabic can mean both "popularity" or "That that is of the people" or more simply "pertaining to the people". The second meaning was used by the Libyan government to refer to the districts of Libya, in tandem with the general ideology of the state. Sha'biyat in Libya are the highest administrative level. A lower level, equivalent to a county, exists and divides each Shabiyah into smaller entities.

The term was new and exclusive to Libya, in line with exclusive terms for republic (jamahiriya), ministry (amanah) and embassy (people's-bureau)—all of which are different from what is used throughout Arabic-speaking countries, including even Libya itself before its adoption of the neology.

== Districts (Shabiya) ==
Shabiyah (Arabic: شعبية šaʿbiyyah English: popularity, plural: شعبيات šaʿbiyyāt English: popularities) is a neologism exclusive to Libya under Gaddafi, in line with exclusive terms for republic (jamahiriya), ministry (secretariat) and embassy (people's-bureau). The term basically means a district, that is, a top level administrative division. Etymologically, it is an adjective meaning "of or pertaining to the people, popular".

=== 22 districts (2007) ===
In 2007 the twenty-two districts (shabiya) replaced the older thirty-two district system.

The list is as following:

The current twenty-two district system in Libya (since 2007)

Map no.	Name	English transliteration	Capital	Area (km^{2})	Population (2006)	Population (2020)	Density (2020 in km^{2})
Cyrenaica
1	البطنان	Al Butnan	Tobruk	84,996	159,536	195,088	2.3
2	درنة	Darnah	Derna	31,511	163,351	201,639	6.4
3	الجبل الاخضر	Al Jabal al Akhdar	Bayda	11,429	203,156	250,020	21.9
4	المرج	Al Marj	Marj	13,515	185,848	286,045	21.2
5	بنغازي	Benghazi	Benghazi	11,372	670,797	807,255	71.0
6	الواحات	Al Wahat	Ajdabiya	103,143	177,047	213,728	20.3
7	الكفرة	Al Kufrah	Al Jawf	453,161	50,104	55,495	0.1
Tripolitania
8	سرت	Surt	Sirte	77,660	193,720	170,869	2.2
9	مصراتة	Misrata	Misrata	29,172	550,938	663,853	22.8
10	المرقب	Marqab	Khoms	6,796	432,202	532,227	78.3
11	طرابلس	Tarabulus	Tripoli	2,666	1,065,405	1,293,016	485.0
12	الجفارة	Al Jafarah	'Aziziya	835	453,198	548,855	657.3
13	الزاوية	Az Zawiyah	Zawiya	2,753	290,993	351,306	127.6
14	النقاط الخمس	An Nuqat al Khams	Zuwara	6,089	287,662	349,755	57.4
15	الجبل الغربي	Al Jabal al Gharbi	Gharyan	76,717	304,159	374,911	4.9
16	نالوت	Nalut	Nalut	67,191	93,224	113,886	1.7
Fezzan
17	الجفرة	Al Jufrah	Hun	117,410	52,342	60,853	0.5
18	وادي الشاطئ	Wadi ash Shati'	Brak	97,160	78,532	95,294	1.0
19	سبها	Sabha	Sabha	15,330	134,162	153,454	1.4
20	وادي الحياة	Wadi al Hayat	Ubari	31,485	76,858	91,749	2.9
21	غات	Ghat	Ghat	68,482	23,518	27,675	0.4
22	مرزق	Murzuq	Murzuk	356,308	78,621	94,088	0.3

=== 32 districts (2001) ===
The 2001 reorganization of Libya into districts (shabiya) resulted in thirty-two districts and three administrative regions (المنطقة الإدارية):

The old thirty-two shabiyat system in Libya (2001–2007)

بلدية	Sha'biyah	Population	Area (km^{2})	Number (on map)
إجدابيا	Ajdabiya	165,839	91,620	1
البطنان	Butnan	144,527	83,860	2
الحزام الاخضر	Hizam al Akhdar	108,860	12,800	3
الجبل الاخضر	Jabal al Akhdar	194,185	7,800	4
الجفارة	Jafara	289,340	1,940	5
الجفرة	Jufra	45,117	117,410	6
الكفرة	Kufra	51,433	483,510	7
المرج	Marj	116,318	10,000	8
المرقب	Murqub	328,292	3,000	9
زوارة	Nuqat al Khams	208,954	5,250	10
القبة	Quba	93,895	14,722	11
الواحات	Al Wahat	29,257	108,670	12
الزاوية	Zawiya	197,177	1,520	13
بنغازي	Benghazi	636,992	800	14
بنى وليد	Bani Walid	77,424	19,710	15
درنة	Derna	81,174	4,908	16
غات	Ghat	22,770	72,700	17
غدامس	Ghadames	19,000	51,750	18
غريان	Gharyan	161,408	4,660	19
مرزق	Murzuq	68,718	349,790	20
مزدة	Mizda	41,476	72,180	21
مصراتة	Misrata	360,521	2,770	22
نالوت	Nalut	86,801	13,300	23
تاجوراء والنواحي الأربع	Tajura wa Arba‘	267,031	1,430	24
ترهونة و مسلاته	Tarhuna wa Msalata	296,092	5,840	25
طرابلس	Tripoli	882,926	400	26
سبها	Sabha	126,610	15,330	27
سرت	Sirte	156,389	77,660	28
صبراته و صرمان	Sabratha wa Sorman	152,521	1,370	29
وادي الحياة	Wadi al Hayaa	72,587	31,890	30
وادي الشاطئ	Wadi al Shatii	77,203	97,160	31
يفرن	Yafran	117,647	9,310	32

The three administrative regions are missing from the above map, Qatrun, Marada, and Jaghbub

=== 26 districts (1998) ===
In 1998 Libya was reorganized into twenty-six districts which were: Butnan, Jafara, Jufra, Kufra, Marj, Murqub, Quba, Al Wahat, Bani Walid, Benghazi, Derna, Gharyan, Jabal al Akhdar, Murzuq, Misrata, Nalut, Nuqat al Khams, Sabha, Sabrata/Sorman, Sirte, Tarhuna/Msalata, Tripoli, Wadi al Hayaa, Wadi al Shatii, Yafran, and Zawiya

=== 13 districts (1995) ===
On 2 August 1995 Libya dropped the baladiyat system and reorganized into thirteen districts (shabiyat). Among them were Butnan (formerly Tobruk), Jabal al Akhdar, Jabal al Gharbi, Zawiya, Benghazi, and Tripoli. However, there is not agreement about the other seven names.

== Former baladiya ==
Baladiyah (singular) or baladiyat (plural), are Arabic words used in many Arab countries to denote administrative divisions of the country. In Libya, the baladiyat system of districts was introduced in 1983 to replace the governorate system. Originally there were forty-six baladiyat districts, but in 1988 that number was reduced to twenty-five baladiyat. The table hereunder lists the old twenty-five baladiyat in alphabetical order with a link to each one and numbered to be located on the map. Note that each district linked may be both a baladiyah and a shabiyah. The many changes may not always be reflected in the article.

- 1 Ajdabiya
- 2 ‘Aziziya
- 3 Butnan
- 4 Fati
- 5 Jabal al Akhdar
- 6 Jufra
- 7 Khoms
- 8 Kufra
- 9 Nuqat al Khams
- 10 Wadi al Shatii
- 11 Ubari
- 12 Zawiya
- 13 Benghazi
- 14 Derna
- 15 Ghadames
- 16 Gharyan
- 17 Misrata
- 18 Murzuq
- 19 Sabha
- 20 Sawfajjin
- 21 Sirte
- 22 Tripoli
- 23 Tarhuna
- 24 Yafran
- 25 Zlitan

Map showing subdivision of former governorates into the 25 baladiya

== Evolution ==
شعبية / بلدية	Name	2007 (22)	2001 (32)	Name in 1998 (26)	1995 (13)	1988 (25)	Capital
إجدابيا	Ajdabiya District		x			x	Ajdabiya
البطنان	Butnan District (Tobruk in 1995, from 1988 Tobruk District)	x	x	Batan	x	Tobruk	Tobruk
الحزام الاخضر	Hizam al Akhdar District		x				Abyar
الجبل الاخضر	Jabal al Akhdar	x	x	Jabal al Akhdar	x	x	Bayda
الجبل الغربي	Jabal al Gharbi District	x			x		Gharyan
الجغبوب	Jaghbub Administrative Region		AR				Administrative Region
الجفارة	Jafara (from 1988 'Aziziya District)	x	x	Jafara		'Aziziya	'Aziziya
الجفرة	Jufra District	x	x	Jufra	4	x	Hun
الكفرة	Kufra District	x	x	Kufra	5	x	Al Jawf
المرج	Marj District (1983–1988 Fati District)	x	x	Marj		Fati	Marj, Barca in antiquity
المرقب	Murqub District (Morqib) (from 1995 & 1988 Khoms District)	x	x	Murqub	5	Khoms	Khoms
القطرون	Qatrun Administrative Region		AR				Administrative Region
القبة	Quba District		x	Quba			Quba, or Giovanni Berta
الواحات	Al Wahat District (Waha in 1995)	x	x	Wahad	4		Ajdabiya (cf. Ajdabiya District)
الوسطى	Wusta				4		
النقاط الخمس	Nuqat al Khams (Nikat al Khums in 1995)	x	x	Nikat al Khams	5	x	Zuwara
أوباري	Awbari District				5a	x	Ubari
الزاوية	Zawiya District	x	x	Zawiya	x	x	Zawiya
بني وليد	Bani Walid District (from 1988 Sawfajjin District)		x	Bani Walid			Bani Walid
بنغازي	Benghazi	x	x	Benghazi	x	x	Benghazi
درنة	Derna District	x	x	Derna		x	Derna
فزان	Fezzan (or Fazzan)				4		Sabha
غدامس	Ghadames District		x			x	Ghadames
غريان	Gharyan District		x	Gharyan		x	Gharyan
غات	Ghat District (from 1988 Ubari)	x	x				Ghat
مرادة	Marada Administrative Region		AR				Administrative Region
مصراتة	Misrata District (includes 1988 Bani Walid District and Zlitan District)	x	x	Misrata	4	x	Misrata
مزدة	Mizda District		x				Mizda
مرزق	Murzuq District (Marzug in 1995)	x	x	Murzaq	5	x	Murzuk
النقازة	Naggaza				4		
نالوت	Nalut District	x	x	Nalout			Nalut
سبها	Sabha District	x	x	Sabha	5	x	Sabha
صبراته و صرمان	Sabratha wa Sorman District		x	Sabratha & Sorman			
سوف الجين	Sawfajjin District				4	x	Bani Walid
سرت	Sirte District (Khalij Sirte in 1995)	x	x	Sirte	5	x	Sirte
تاجوراء والنواحي الأربع	Tajura wa Arba‘ District		x				Tajura
طرابلس	Tripoli District	x	x	Tripoli	x	x	Tripoli
ترهونة و مسلاته	Tarhuna wa Msalata District (from 1988 Tarhuna District)		x	Tarhuna & Msalata		Tarhuna	Tarhuna
وادي الحياة	Wadi al Hayaa District (1995 Wadi al Hait?, from 1988 Ubari)	x	x	Wadi al Hait?	5b		
وادي الشاطئ	Wadi al Shatii District (Shati' in 1988)	x	x	Wadi al Shaati		Shati'	Adiri or Brak
يفرن	Yafran District (Yifren)		x	Yefrin		x	Yafran
زليتن	Zlitan District					x	Zliten

For 1995 data, [4] and [5] are the two different sources mentioned in the bibliography: "The Europa World Year Book 2001" and "Ershiyi (21) Shiji Shijie Diming Lu", Beijing, 2001.

For 1988, name is provided if different from nowadays. As said above, AR stands for the three "Administrative Region" of 2001.

Fazzan wasn't strictly a district, but a historical muhafazah or wilayah along with Tripolitania (capital Tripoli) and Cyrenaica (capital Cyrene -near nowadays Shahhat- with Diocletian, moved to Ptolemais after the earthquake of 365, and to Barce -nowadays Barca- with Omer Bin Khattab in 643).

== See also ==
- FIPS region codes of Libya
- ISO 3166-2:LY
- List of cities in Libya
- Subdivisions of Libya
