= Sabratha wa Sorman District =

Former district of Libya

Coordinates: 32°47′N 12°29′E

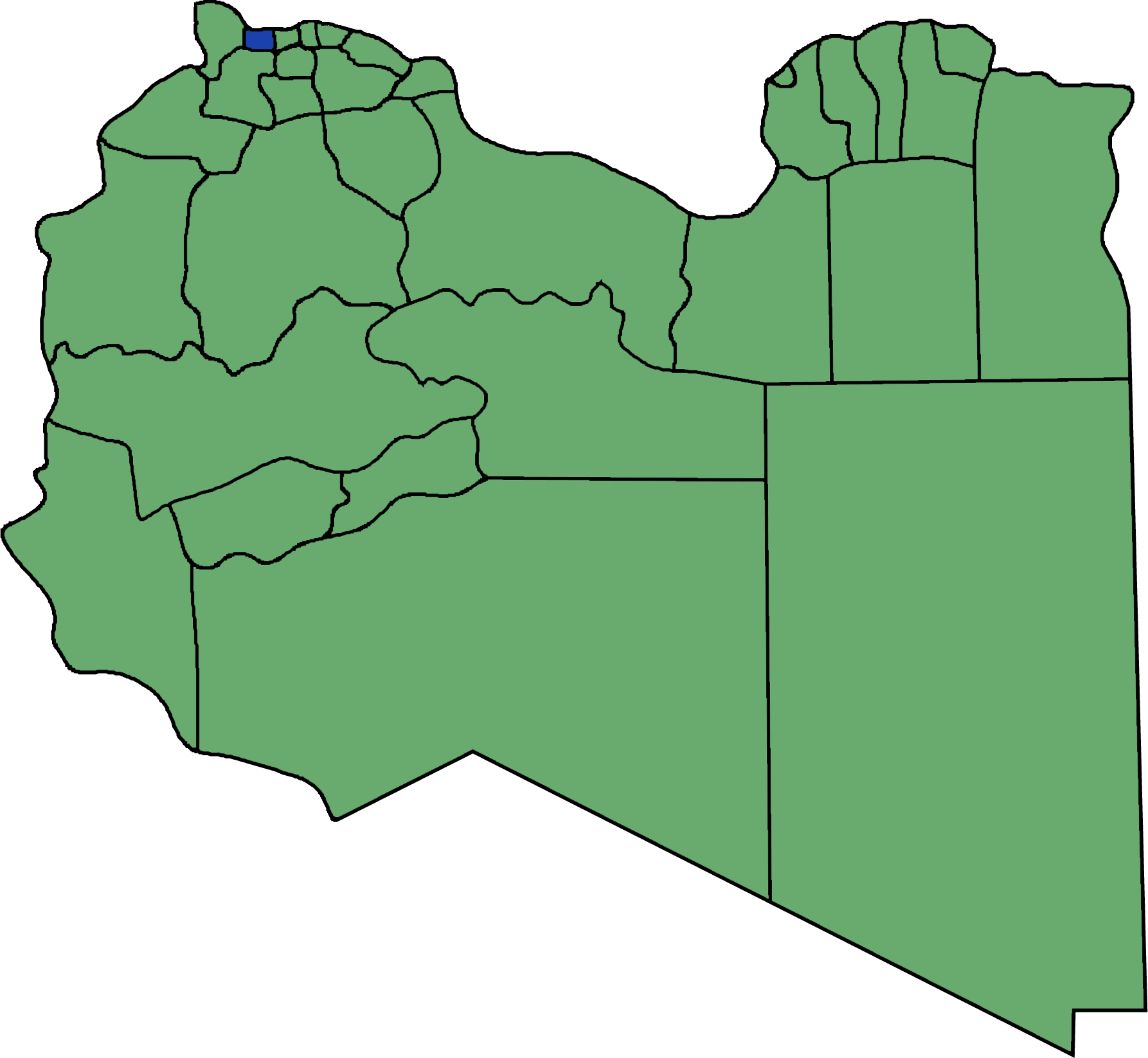
Pre-2007 extent of Sabratha Wa Surman District

Sabratha wa Surman (Sabratha and Surman) was one of the districts of Libya from 1998 to 2007, in the Northwest. Since 2007 the area has been part of Zawiya District.

In the north, Sabratha wa Surman had a shoreline on the Mediterranean Sea. On land, it bordered the following districts:

- Zawiya - east
- Jafara - southeast, at a quadripoint
- Yafran - south
- Nuqat al Khams - west
