= ʽAziziya =

ʽAziziya العزيزية
- Location in Libya
- Coordinates: 32°31′51″N 13°01′16″E
- Country: Libya
- Region: Tripolitania
- District: Jafara
- Elevation: 390 ft (119 m)

Population (2006)
  - Total: 23,399
- Time zone: UTC+2 (EET)
- License Plate Code: 25

ʽAziziya (/əˈziːziːə/; Arabic: العزيزية al-ʿAzīziyyah / al-ʻAzīzīyah / al-ʿazīzīya), sometimes spelled El Azizia, is a small town and capital of the Jafara district in northwestern Libya, 41 kilometres (25 mi) southwest of the capital Tripoli. From 1918 to 1922, it was the capital of the Tripolitanian Republic, the first formal republic in the Arab world. Before 2001, it was part of the ʽAziziya District and served as its capital. ʽAziziya is a major trade centre of the Sahel Jeffare plateau, being on a trade route from the coast to the Nafusa Mountains and the Fezzan region to the south. As of 2006, the town's population has been estimated at 23,399.

== Geography and climate ==
According to the Köppen climate classification, ʽAziziya has a borderline hot semi-arid climate (BSh) immediately bordering a hot desert climate (BWh). On 13 September 1922, a high temperature of 58.0 °C (136.4 °F) was recorded in ʽAziziya. This was long considered the highest temperature ever measured on Earth; however, this record was deemed illegitimate in 2012 after an investigation by the World Meteorological Organization (WMO).

Even before it was officially declared illegitimate, the 1922 reading was still controversial:

1. The weather station was first in ʽAziziya town, but, in 1919, it was moved to a hilltop fort, where the weather station was set up on black tarmac, which would have absorbed more sunlight and made the air there artificially hotter, explaining a period of very hot readings there from 1919 to 1928.
2. Shortly before the record reading on 13 September 1922, the weather station's usual maximum thermometer had been damaged and then replaced by an uncalibrated, ordinary maximum-minimum thermometer of the kind often used in greenhouses.
3. On 11 September 1922, the usual record keeper was replaced by an inexperienced observer, who was untrained in the use of the thermometer and the record log. This is known by the change in handwriting on the log sheets and by the high and low temperatures being recorded in the wrong columns. The thermometer used sliding colored cylinders to record maximum and minimum temperatures, and these cylinders were about 7 to 8 degrees Celsius long on the thermometer scale. The WMO now believes that the inexperienced observer was reading from the wrong end of the high-temperature cylinder inside the thermometer, getting a reading which was 7 to 8 degrees too high.
4. On 13 September 2012, the WMO announced that their Commission of Climatology World Archive of Weather and Climate Extremes had found that the record was invalid. As such, the world record for hottest temperature is now 56.7 °C (134.1 °F), recorded on 10 July 1913 at Greenland Ranch in Death Valley, California in the United States.

Climate data for ʽAziziya
| Month | Jan | Feb | Mar | Apr | May | Jun | Jul | Aug | Sep | Oct | Nov | Dec | Year |
|---|---|---|---|---|---|---|---|---|---|---|---|---|---|
| Mean daily maximum °C (°F) | 17.2 (63.0) | 20.0 (68.0) | 22.8 (73.0) | 27.2 (81.0) | 31.1 (88.0) | 36.1 (97.0) | 37.8 (100.0) | 37.8 (100.0) | 36.1 (97.0) | 31.1 (88.0) | 24.4 (75.9) | 18.9 (66.0) | 28.4 (83.1) |
| Daily mean °C (°F) | 11.7 (53.1) | 13.3 (55.9) | 15.6 (60.1) | 19.4 (66.9) | 23.3 (73.9) | 27.2 (81.0) | 28.8 (83.8) | 28.8 (83.8) | 27.8 (82.0) | 23.3 (73.9) | 18.3 (64.9) | 12.8 (55.0) | 20.9 (69.5) |
| Mean daily minimum °C (°F) | 5.6 (42.1) | 6.7 (44.1) | 8.3 (46.9) | 10.6 (51.1) | 15.0 (59.0) | 18.3 (64.9) | 20.0 (68.0) | 20.0 (68.0) | 19.4 (66.9) | 16.1 (61.0) | 11.7 (53.1) | 6.7 (44.1) | 13.2 (55.8) |
| Average rainfall mm (inches) | 47 (1.9) | 31 (1.2) | 22 (0.9) | 8 (0.3) | 8 (0.3) | 2 (0.1) | 1 (0.0) | 1 (0.0) | 5 (0.2) | 16 (0.6) | 25 (1.0) | 61 (2.4) | 227 (8.9) |
Source: Arab Meteorology Book
