= Hizam al Akhdar District =

Former district of Libya

Coordinates: 31°40′N 20°20′E

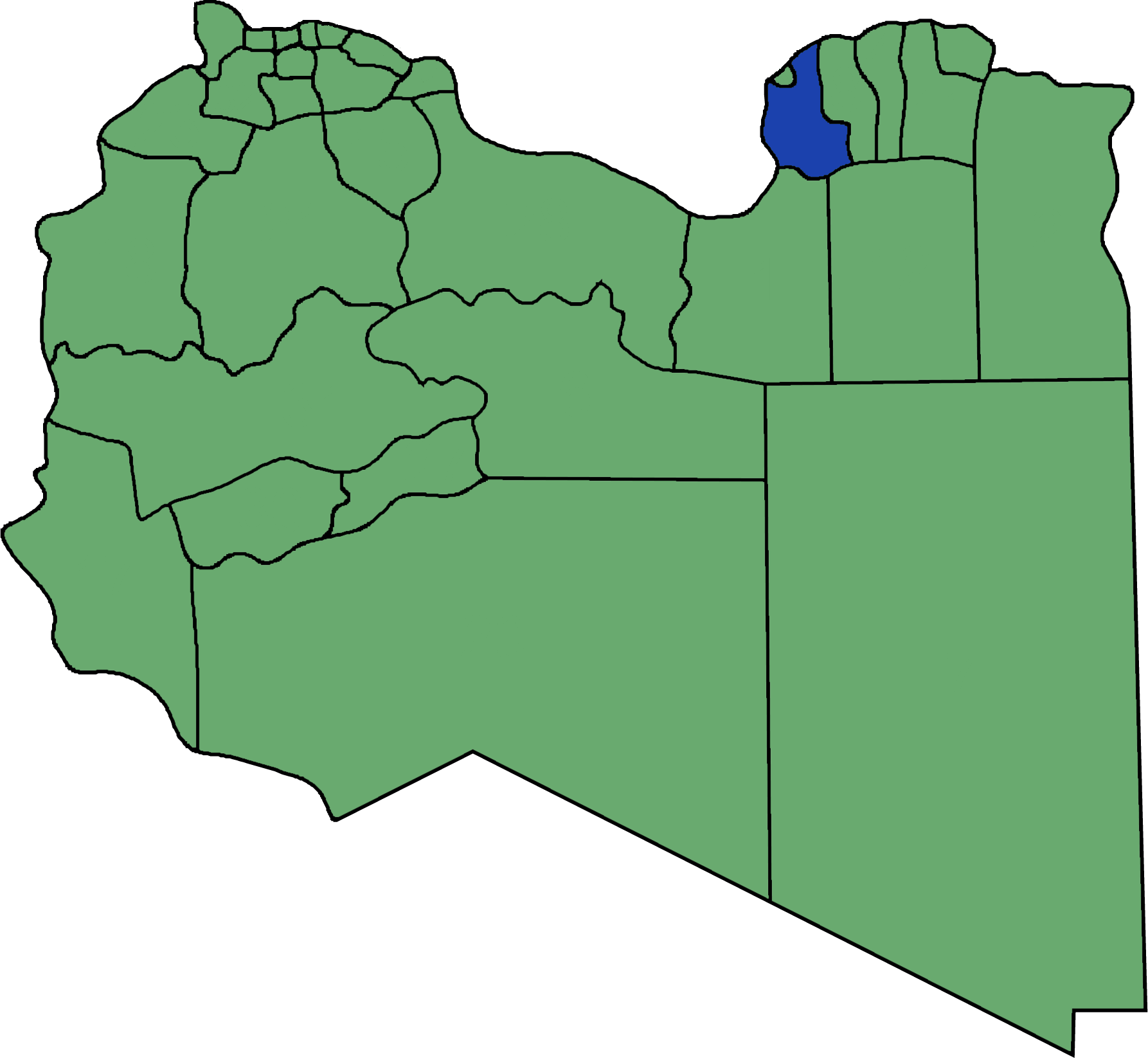
Pre-2007 extent of Hizam al Akhdar District

Hizam al Akhdar (Arabic: الحزام الأخضر Al Ḥizām al Aḫḍar, English: Green Belt) was one of the 32 districts (shabiyat) of Libya, prior to the 2007 administrative reorganization. The former capital city was Abyar. The territory of Hizam al Akhdar was transferred to the newly enlarged Marj District.

== Former bounds ==
In the north and west, Hizam al Akhdar had a shoreline on the Mediterranean Sea. On land, it bordered the following districts:

- Benghazi - northwest
- Marj - east
- Al Wahat - southeast
- Ajdabiya - southwest
