= Qasr bin Ghashir =

Coordinates: 32°41′7″N 13°10′32″E

Qasr bin Ghashir قصر بن
- Interactive map of Qasr bin Ghashir

Qasr Bin Ghashir (Arabic: قصر بن غشير) meaning "Ghashir Palace" is a town in the Tripoli District, of the Tripolitania region in northwestern Libya. Named after Abdullah Ben Ghashir, due to his majority proprietary holding of the land in the region. It is located about 20 km south of central Tripoli. The Tripoli International Airport is located close by.

== History ==
=== 1911-1943 Italian Colonization of Libya - Castel Benito ===
During the Italian colonization of Libya, the Italian army defeated the Libyan resistance in Qasr Bin Ghashir and executed Abdullah Bin Ghashir, taking control and possession of the land and changing the name of the town to "Castel Benito".

In 1947, the name was changed back to Qasr bin Ghashir and all land rights returned to the Libyan Government after Italy relinquished its claims to Libya as part of the 1947 Peace Treaty.

During the Italian invasion, descendants of Abdullah Bin Ghashir travelled to other parts of Libya for safety. As a safety measure, some adapted their surnames to alternatives of Bin Ghashir, such as Ben Gasher, Gashier or Ghasheer.

=== 2011 Libyan Civil War ===
In the 2011 Libyan civil war, the town was a loyalist pro-Gaddafi camp which included a prisoners of war camp. On 27 August 2011, however, rebel forces, having captured the surrounding area in the battle of Tripoli, captured the village.
