= Gharyan District =

Former district of Libya

Coordinates: 32°10′N 13°01′E

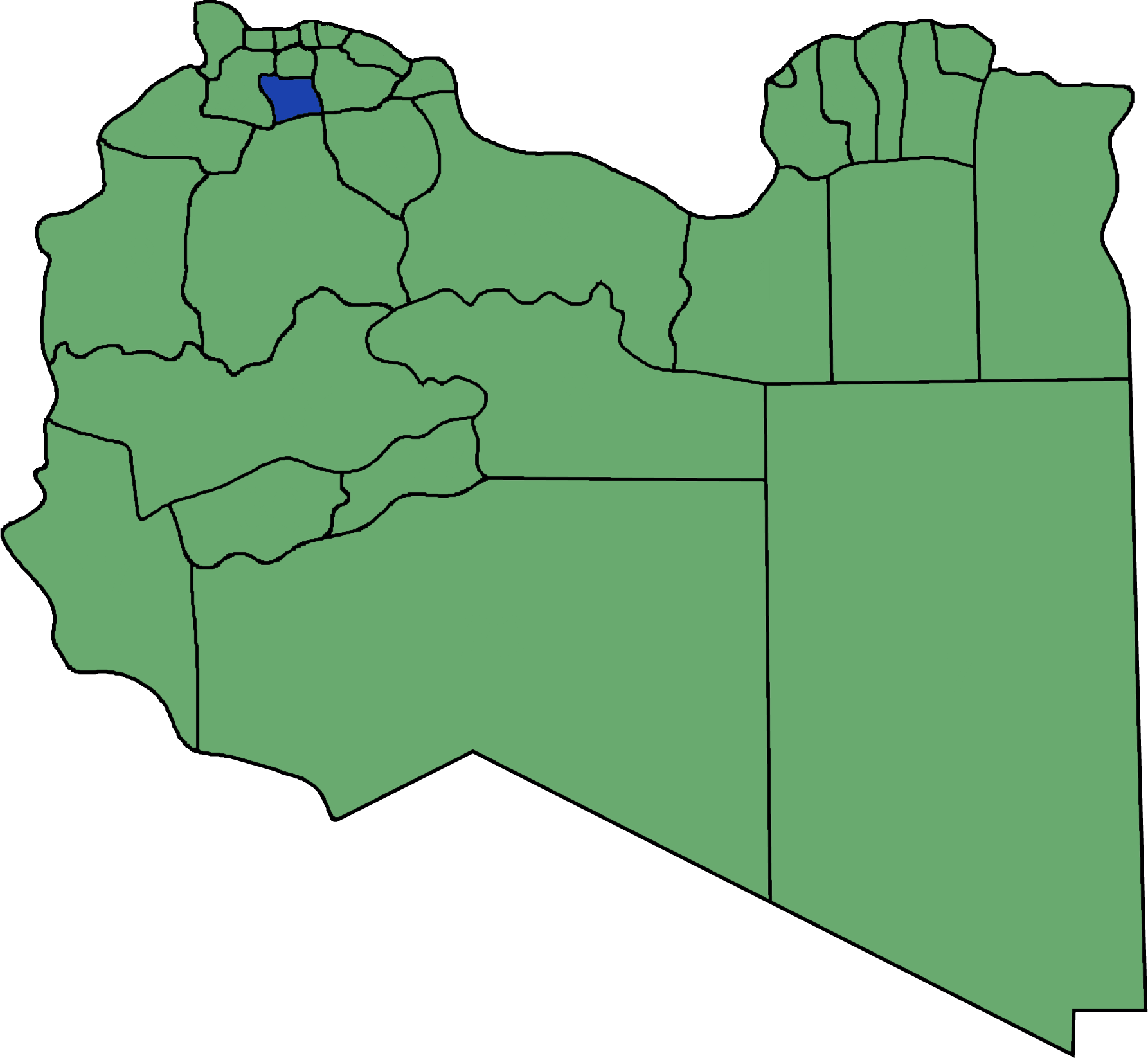
Gharyan District location prior to 2007

Gharyan District or Garian District (Arabic: شعبية غريان) was one of the districts of Libya. It was located in the northwest part of the country and its capital was Gharyan. Under the 2007 reorganization of districts, it became part of Jabal al Gharbi District.

Gharyan District was governed by a district congress which had ten committees that conducted day-to-day management and oversight. Those committees were: Marine resources; Manpower, Employment and Training; Planning; Justice; Economy and Trade; Tourism; Public Security; Agriculture and Livestock; Industry, Mines and Energy; and Housing and Utilities.

== Boundaries ==
Prior to 2007 Gharyan bordered the following districts:

- Jafara - north
- Tarhuna Wa Msalata - east
- Bani Walid - southeast, at a quadripoint
- Mizda - south
- Yafran - west

== Attractions and communities ==
The World War II "Lady_of_Gharyan" portrait is located in an abandoned Italian army barracks, just west Gharyan, off a primitive road to the south.
