= Zlitan Municipality =

Coordinates: 32°28′N 14°34′E

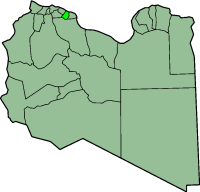
Map showing Zlitan District, 1988–1995

Zlitan (Arabic: زليتن Zliten) was one of the municipalities (baladiyah) of Libya from 1983 to 1995. It lay in the northwestern part of the country, on the Mediterranean coast. In 1995 most of the municipality was included as part of Misrata District, where it remains as of 2009.

== Settlements ==
The municipality, from 1988 to 1995 included the following settlements:

- Fawatir
- Al Huwayjat
- Al Jumah
- Mintaqat ad Daghdughi
- Naimah
- Libya Qabilat Dirsunah
- Qabilat al Fawatir
- Qabilat al Hurmah
- Qabilat al Abadilah
- Qabilat al Abadinah
- Qabilat al Ataya
- Qabilat ar Rahumat
- Qabilat ash Shutaywiyah
- Qabilat as Saqu
- Qaryat ad Dawairah
- Qaryat Hujjajah
- Qaryat al Wuqayyat
- Suq al Jumah
- Wuriran
- Zawiyat al Mahjub
- Zliten
