= Yafran =

Yafran يفرن
- City
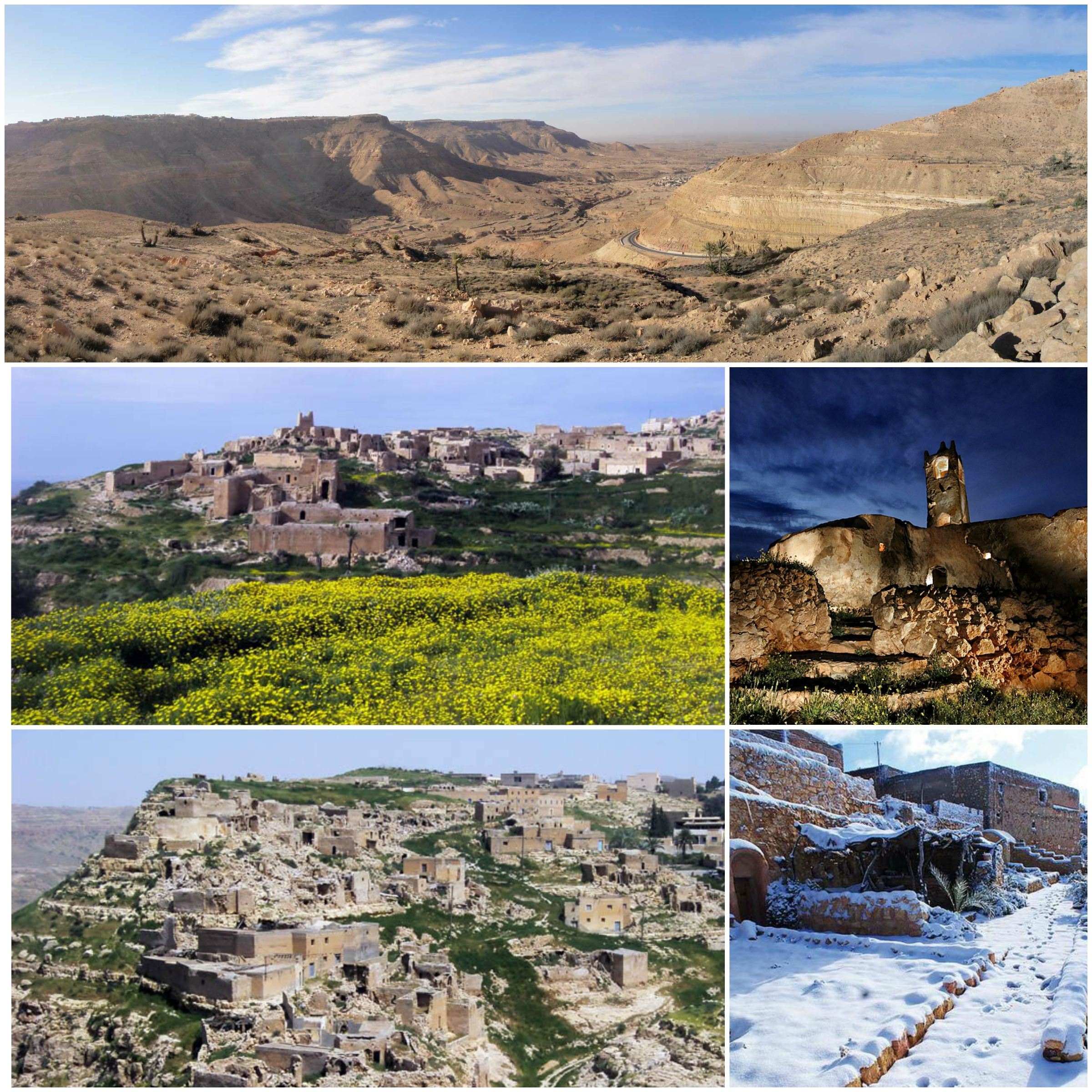
- Top: The view from the city of Yafran; Middle Left: Yellow blossom flowers blooming in spring; Middle right: Ancient church in Yafran; Bottom left: The ancient ruin town of Yafran Bottom right: The houses in Yafran covered with snow

- Location in Libya
- Coordinates: 32°03′46″N 12°31′36″E
- Country: Libya
- Region: Tripolitania
- District: Jabal al Gharbi
- Elevation: 678 m (2,224 ft)

Population (2012)
  - Total: 54,573
- Time zone: UTC+2 (EET)
- Area code: +218 421
- License Plate Code: 22

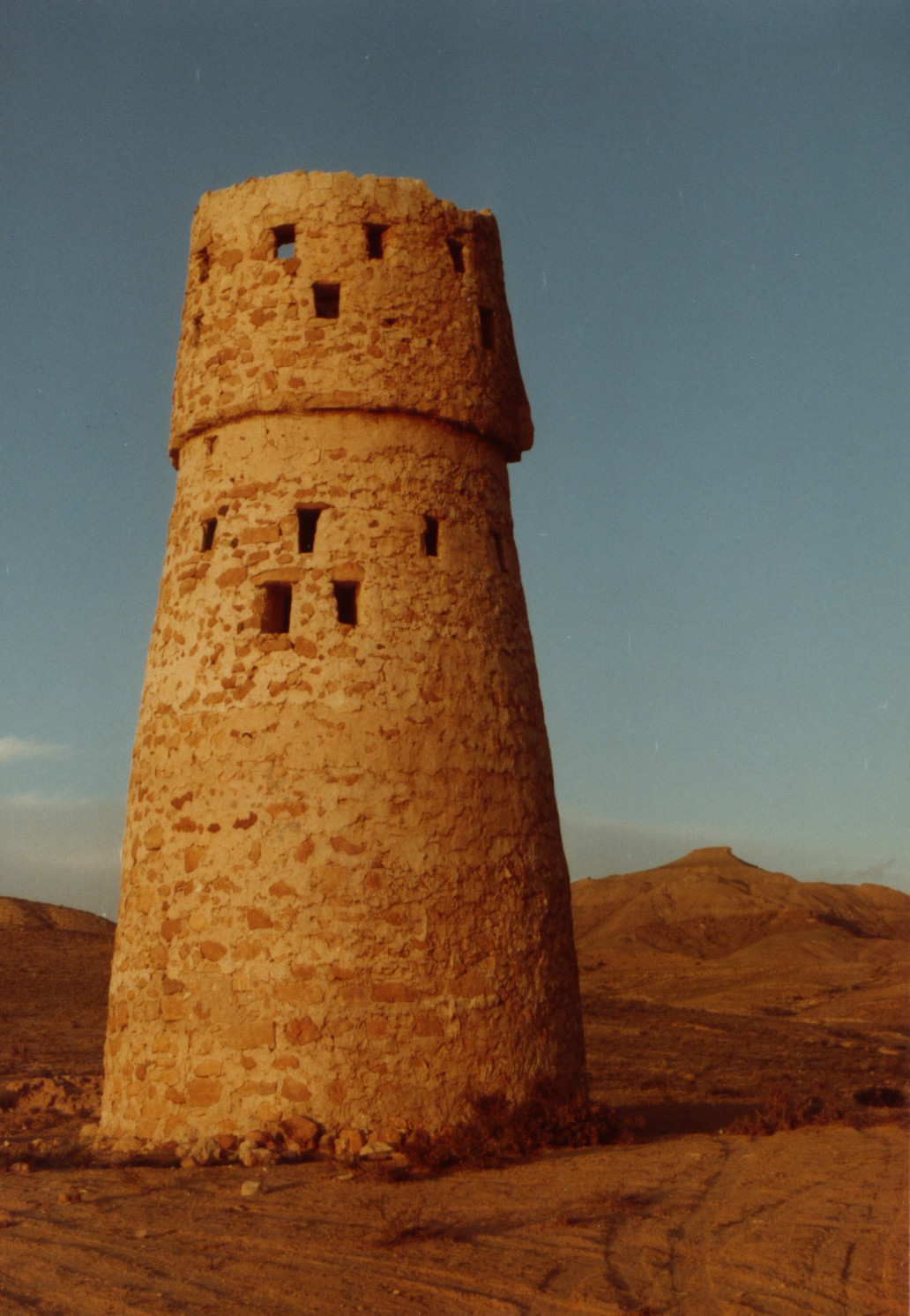
Watch tower near Yefren

Yafran /ˈjɑːfrən/ (Arabic: يفرن), also spelled Jefren, Yefren, Yifran, Yifrin or Ifrane, is a city in northwestern Libya, in the Jabal al Gharbi District in the western Nafusa Mountains. Before 2007, Yafran was the administrative seat of the Yafran District.

== History ==
=== Libyan civil war ===
Yafran people, as in other cities of Libya, demonstrated against Muammar Gaddafi. Subsequently, Yafran was exposed to bombardment and siege by Gaddafi forces. As of May 2011, Gaddafi's forces had shut down the water system and blocked food supplies and held the western part of the town with some 500 rebels in the eastern section of Yafran still resisting.

Yafran fell to Gaddafi's forces sometime in late May or early June. The centre of the town was used as a position for "government tanks, artillery guns and snipers". On 2 June, rebel forces retook the city center and started to clear the area of Gaddafi's forces. On 6 June, an on-site Reuters journalist reported that the pro-Gaddafi forces were nowhere to be seen in or around the town.

=== Jewish community ===
Yafran had a deep-rooted Jewish history dating back to antiquity. According to chronicler Mordehai HaCohen (1856–1929), a local tradition holds that the Jewish community there originated after the destruction of Jerusalem in 70 CE, when generals under Titus allegedly sold 30,000 Jewish captives to Bedouins in Yafran.

The local Jewish population flourished under Ottoman rule. During the Italian occupation of Libya in 1910–1922, they suffered persecution by the local Arab population; some of them fled to Tripoli.

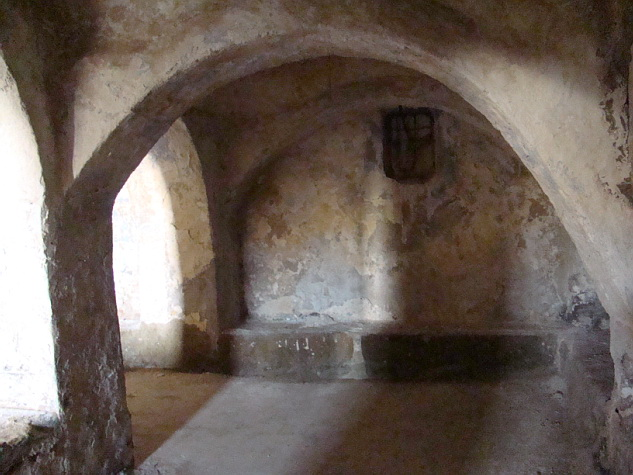
Synagogue in Yefren

During World War II, Jews from Cyrenaica were brought to labor camps in Yafran; some Jews were later deported to the Giado concentration camp. After the Tripolitania riots in 1945, most of the Jewish population moved to Tripoli and eventually emigrated to Israel in the 1950s.

== Climate ==
Yafran has a semi-arid climate (Köppen: BSh) with hot, dry summers and cool, somewhat rainy winters.

Climate data for Yafran (1991–2020)
| Month | Jan | Feb | Mar | Apr | May | Jun | Jul | Aug | Sep | Oct | Nov | Dec | Year |
|---|---|---|---|---|---|---|---|---|---|---|---|---|---|
| Record high °C (°F) | 25.0 (77.0) | 30.7 (87.3) | 33.5 (92.3) | 37.8 (100.0) | 40.8 (105.4) | 42.0 (107.6) | 43.0 (109.4) | 42.5 (108.5) | 40.5 (104.9) | 38.5 (101.3) | 34.6 (94.3) | 27.0 (80.6) | 43.0 (109.4) |
| Mean daily maximum °C (°F) | 13.0 (55.4) | 14.7 (58.5) | 18.7 (65.7) | 23.3 (73.9) | 28.0 (82.4) | 32.0 (89.6) | 33.8 (92.8) | 33.8 (92.8) | 30.9 (87.6) | 26.0 (78.8) | 19.4 (66.9) | 14.2 (57.6) | 24.0 (75.2) |
| Daily mean °C (°F) | 10.1 (50.2) | 11.2 (52.2) | 14.4 (57.9) | 18.3 (64.9) | 22.6 (72.7) | 26.8 (80.2) | 28.2 (82.8) | 28.5 (83.3) | 26.0 (78.8) | 21.9 (71.4) | 16.0 (60.8) | 11.3 (52.3) | 19.6 (67.3) |
| Mean daily minimum °C (°F) | 7.2 (45.0) | 7.7 (45.9) | 10.2 (50.4) | 13.3 (55.9) | 17.3 (63.1) | 20.9 (69.6) | 22.7 (72.9) | 23.2 (73.8) | 21.1 (70.0) | 17.8 (64.0) | 12.5 (54.5) | 8.5 (47.3) | 15.2 (59.4) |
| Record low °C (°F) | −8.0 (17.6) | −9.5 (14.9) | −6.5 (20.3) | −4.9 (23.2) | 2.1 (35.8) | 5.6 (42.1) | 9.2 (48.6) | 10.0 (50.0) | 8.6 (47.5) | 4.6 (40.3) | −1.8 (28.8) | −3.4 (25.9) | −9.5 (14.9) |
| Average precipitation mm (inches) | 52.4 (2.06) | 47.0 (1.85) | 35.0 (1.38) | 12.9 (0.51) | 8.6 (0.34) | 2.8 (0.11) | 0.3 (0.01) | 1.3 (0.05) | 7.1 (0.28) | 25.3 (1.00) | 20.7 (0.81) | 44.0 (1.73) | 257.4 (10.13) |
| Average precipitation days (≥ 1 mm) | 4.3 | 4.1 | 3.2 | 1.6 | 1.2 | 0.5 | 0.0 | 0.3 | 1.2 | 2.2 | 2.6 | 4.6 | 25.8 |
| Average relative humidity (%) | 65.4 | 60.2 | 53.9 | 48.9 | 45.1 | 43.2 | 44.4 | 46.1 | 53.4 | 56.6 | 59.1 | 65.0 | 53.4 |
| Average dew point °C (°F) | 2.8 (37.0) | 2.2 (36.0) | 3.6 (38.5) | 5.7 (42.3) | 8.2 (46.8) | 10.9 (51.6) | 13.2 (55.8) | 14.2 (57.6) | 14.2 (57.6) | 11.2 (52.2) | 6.7 (44.1) | 4.0 (39.2) | 8.1 (46.6) |
Source: NOAA

== See also ==
- List of cities in Libya
