= Marj District =

District of Libya

Coordinates: 32°30′N 20°50′E

Marj المرج
- District
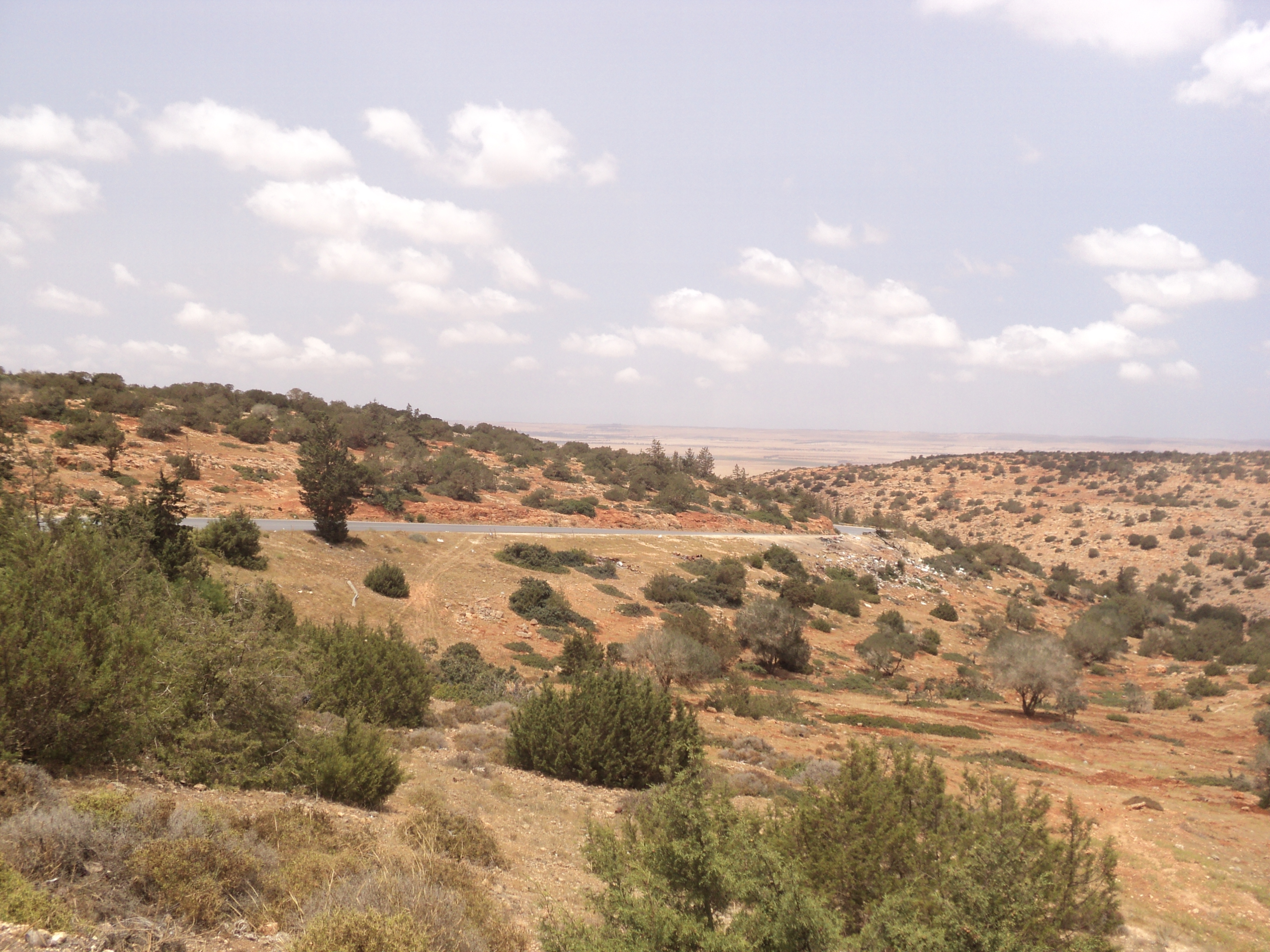

- Map of Libya with Marj district highlighted
- Country: Libya
- Capital: Marj

Area
  - Total: 10,000 km^{2} (3,900 sq mi)

Population (2006)
  - Total: 185,848
  - Density: 19/km^{2} (48/sq mi)
- License Plate Code: 18, 30, 52, 58

Marj (Arabic: المرج, al-Marj, "The Meadows"), pronounced El Merj in Benghazi Arabic, is a district (shabiyah) of northeastern Libya on the Mediterranean Sea coast. Its administrative seat is the city of Marj, which is generally believed to be the site of the ancient and medieval city of Barca. Marj is situated on the Cyrenaica Plateau at the western edge of the Jebel Akhdar. In the 2007 administrative reorganization, part of the territory formerly in Al Hizam al Akhdar District was transferred to Marj. In the north, Marj has a shoreline on the Mediterranean Sea. On land, it borders Jabal al Akhdar in the east, Al Wahat in south and Benghazi in the west.

Per the census of 2012, the total population in the region was 157,747 with 150,353 Libyans. The average size of the household in the country was 6.9, while the average household size of non-Libyans being 3.7. There were totally 22,713 households in the district, with 20,907 Libyan ones. The population density of the district was 1.86 persons per km^{2}. Per 2006 census, there were totally 13,313 economically active people in the district.

== Geography ==
Libya has mostly a flat undulating plain and occasional plateau, with an average elevation of around 423 m (1,388 ft). Around 91 per cent of the land is covered by desert, with only 8.8 per cent agricultural land (with only 1% arable lands) and 0.1 per cent of forests. The major resources are petroleum, gypsum and natural gas. Along the coastal regions, the climate is Mediterranean in coastal areas, while it is desert climate in all other parts. Dust storms lasting four to eight days is pretty common during Spring. Triplotania is the northwest region, while it is Cyrenacia in the east and Fezzen in southwest. Cyrenacia is the largest region in Libya, which is mostly semi arid in nature. The region receives an annual rainfall of 5 in (130 mm). There are no perennial rivers in the region, but the region is abundant with groundwater aquifers.

== Demographics ==
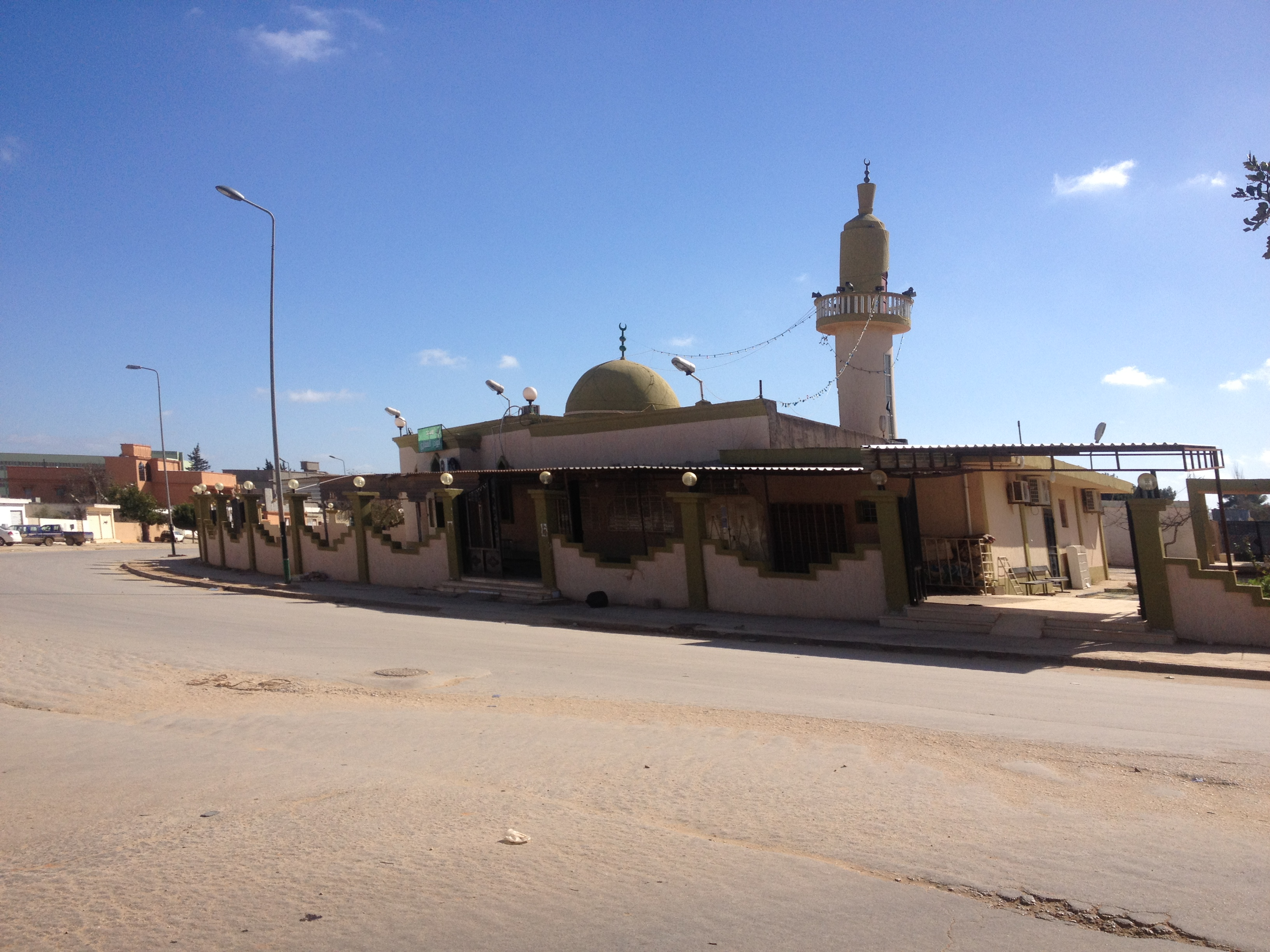
Abi Zar al Ghifari mosque, Marj

Per the census of 2012, the total population in the region was 157,747 with 150,353 Libyans. The average size of the household in the country was 6.9, while the average household size of non-Libyans being 3.7. There were totally 22,713 households in the district, with 20,907 Libyan ones. The population density of the district was 1.86 persons per km^{2}. Per 2006 census, there were totally 13,313 economically active people in the district. There were 6,295 government employees, 2,178 employers, 6,454 first level workers and 001 second level workers. There were 3,573 workers in state administration, 1,999 in agriculture, animal husbandry and forestry, 2,445 in agriculture & hunting, 2,029 in education, 1,558 in private enterprises, 584 in health & social work, 925 in production, 2,214 in technical work and 354 service workers. The total enrollment in schools was 17,364 and the number of people above secondary stage and less than graduation was 875. As per the report from World Health Organization (WHO), there were one communicable disease centre, one dental clinic, one general clinic, no in-patient clinics, three out-patient clinics, five pharmacies, 16 PHC centres, zero polyclinics, one rural clinic and no specialized clinics. Islam is the state and major religion of the country.

== Local administration ==
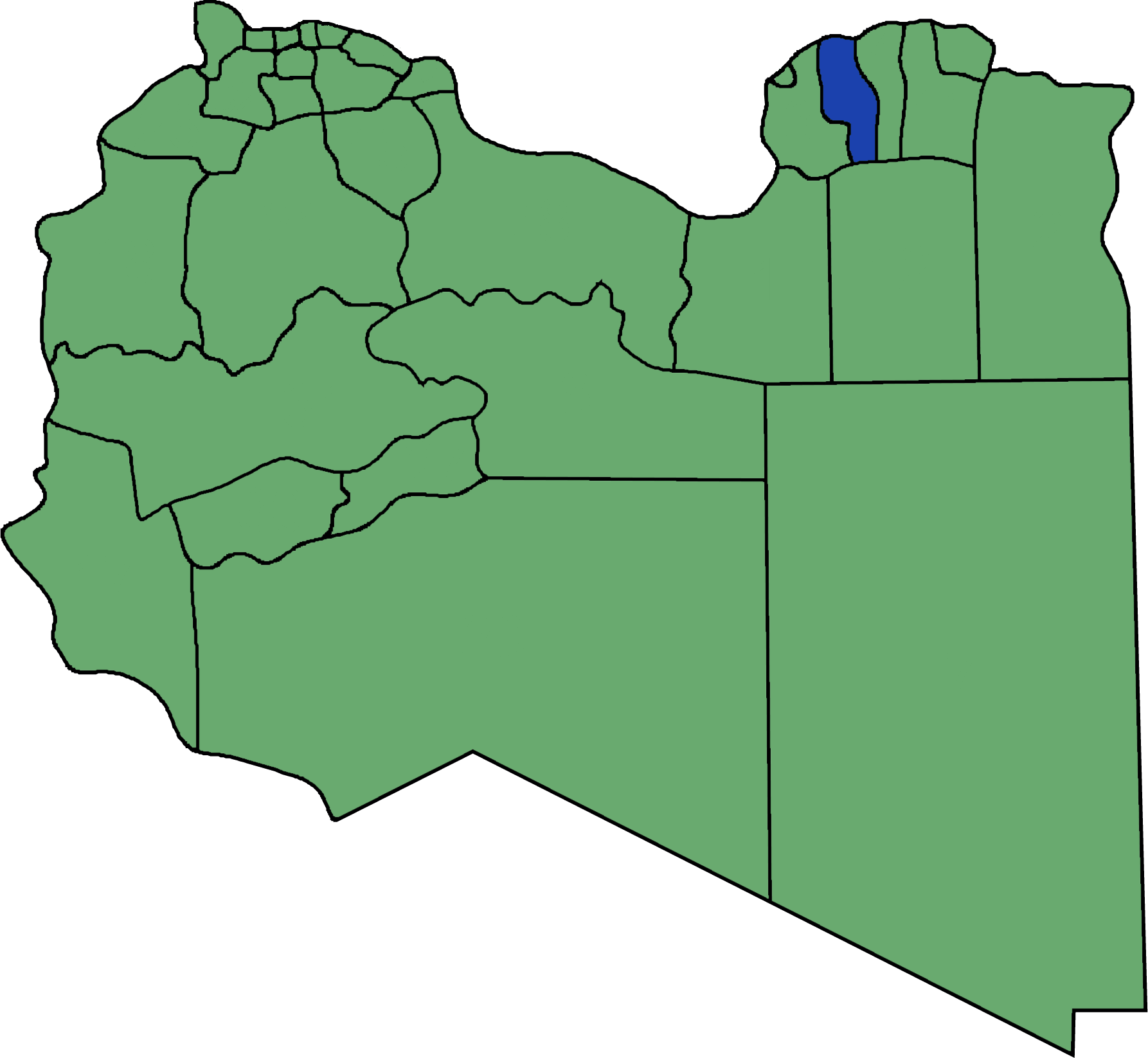
Pre-2007 extent of the Marj District.

Libya became independent in 1951 from the colonial empire and generally known for its oil rich resources. All the powers rested centrally with the President Gaddafi for 42 years till the 2011 armed rebellion which topple him. As per the constitution, Libya is the most decentralized Arab nation, but practically all powers are vested on central government on account of control over the oil revenues. Local governmental institutions manage the administration of education, industry, and communities. As a part of decentralization in 2012, the country is administratively split into 13 regions from the original 25 municipalities, which were further divided in 1,500 communes. Since 2015, the chief of the state is a chairman of Presidential Council, while the prime minister is the head of the state. The House of Representatives is an elected body that is elected on universal suffrage and popular vote. As of 2016, there were 22 administrative divisions in the country in the form of districts.
