= Tarhuna Municipality =

Coordinates: 32°26′1″N 13°38′5″E

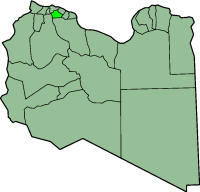
Map showing Tarhunah as it was from 1988 to 1995.

Tarhunah Municipality (Arabic: ترهونة) is one of the former municipalities (baladiyat) of Libya from 1983 to 1995. It is in the north of the country, in the position later (2001-2007) occupied by Tarhuna Wa Msalata District.

Tarhunah was brought to international attention in the 1990s, when it was believed that an underground chemical weapons facility was being built there, following the discovery of a previous smaller above-ground facility at Rabta (Algeria?).

== See also ==
- Tarhuna Wa Msalata District
