= Zawiya District =

District of Libya

Coordinates: 32°45′N 12°43′E

Zawiya الزاوية
- District
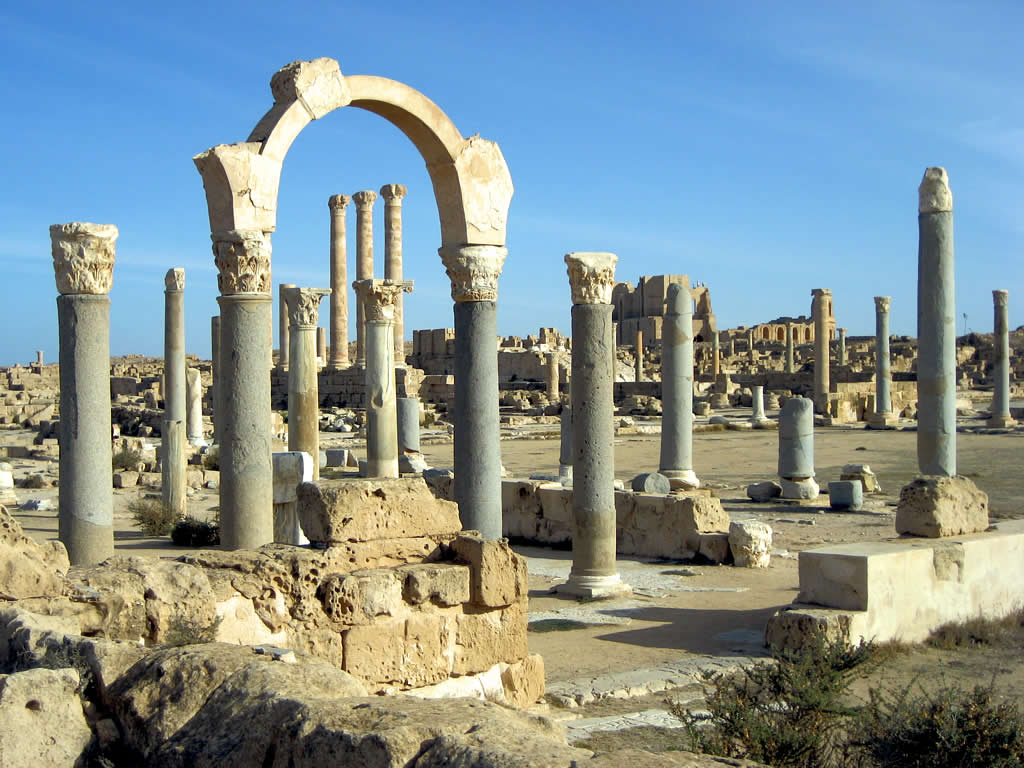
- Sabratha ruins

- Map of Libya with Zawiya district highlighted
- Country: Libya
- Capital: Zawiya

Area
  - Total: 2,890 km^{2} (1,120 sq mi)

Population (2006)
  - Total: 290,993
  - Density: 101/km^{2} (261/sq mi)
- License Plate Code: 4

Zawiya, officially Zawia (Arabic: محافظة الزاوية Az Zāwiya), is one of the districts of Libya. It is located in the north western part of the country, in what had been the historical region of Tripolitania. Its capital is also named Zawia. the province of Az Zawiya has three major municipalities; according to the new laws of local governance, includes Central Az Zawiya municipality, Southern Az Zawia municipality and Eastern Az zawiya municipality. In the north, Zawiya province has a shoreline bordering the Mediterranean Sea, while it borders Tripoli in east, Jafara in southeast, Jabal al Gharbi in south, Surman in the west.

Per the census of 2012, the total population in the region was 157,747. The average size of the household in the country was 6.9. There were totally 22,713 households in the district, with 20,907 Libyan ones. The population density of the district was 1.86 persons per sq. km.

== Geography ==
In the north, Zawiya has a shoreline bordering the Mediterranean Sea. On land, it borders the following districts, namely, Tripoli in east, Jafara in southeast, Jabal al Gharbi in south, Nuqat al Khams in the west. Zawiya is a part of Triplotania geographical region of Libya that runs from north to south and has set of coastal oases, plains and limestone plateaus having an elevation of 2,000 ft (610 m) to 3,000 ft (910 m). The region receives an annual rainfall of 16 in (410 mm). There are no perennial rivers in the region, but the region is abundant with groundwater aquifers. Most of the major cities of Libya are located in the coastal regions. Libya has mostly a flat undulating plain and occasional plateau, with an average elevation of around 423 m (1,388 ft). Around 91 per cent of the land is covered by desert, with only 8.8 per cent agricultural land (with only 1% arable lands) and 0.1 per cent of forests. The major resources are petroleum, gypsum and natural gas. Along the coastal regions, the climate is Mediterranean in coastal areas, while it is desert climate in all other parts. Dust storms lasting four to eight days is pretty common during Spring. Triplotania is the northwest region, while it is Cyrenacia in the east and Fezzen in southwest.

== Demographics ==
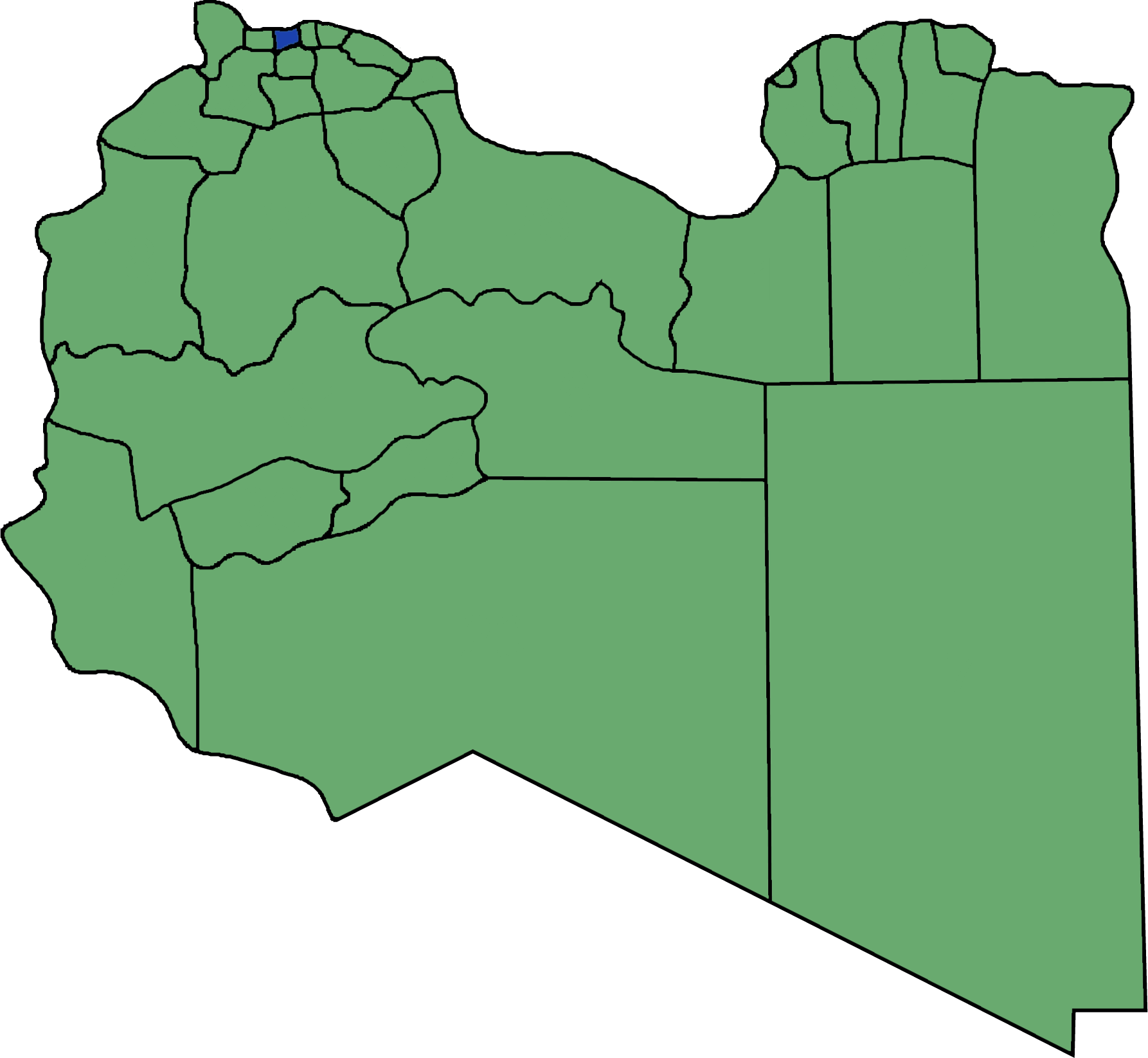
Pre-2007 extent of Zawiya District

Per the census of 2012, the total population in the region was 157,747 with 150,353 Libyans. The average size of the household in the country was 6.9, while the average household size of non-Libyans being 3.7. There were totally 22,713 households in the district, with 20,907 Libyan ones. The population density of the district was 1.86 persons per sq. km. Per 2006 census, there were totally 107,135 economically active people in the district. There were 53,485 government employees, 6,411 employers, 34,185 first level workers and 029 second level workers. There were 16,292 workers in state administration, 6,140 in agriculture, animal husbandry and forestry, 7,193 in agriculture & hunting, 32,819 in education, 8,549 in private enterprises, 3,263 in health & social work, 8,451 in production, 33,904 in technical work and 523 service workers. The total enrollment in schools was 91,747 and the number of people above secondary stage and less than graduation was 4,219. As per the report from World Health Organization (WHO), there were 1 communicable disease centres, 6 dental clinics, 2 general clinics, 3 in-patient clinics, 32 out-patient clinics, 79 pharmacies, 58 PHC centres, 2 polyclinics, 0 rural clinics and 0 specialized clinics.

== Administration ==
Since the 2007 reorganization of Libyan districts, the former district of Sabratha Wa Surman has been part of Zawiya District. Libya became independent in 1951 from the colonial empire and generally known for its oil rich resources. As a part of decentralization in 2012, the country is administratively split into 13 regions from the original 25 municipalities, which were further divided in 1,500 communes. As of 2016, there were 22 administrative divisions in the country in the form of districts.
