= Sawfajjin Municipality =

Libyan municipality (1987-1995)

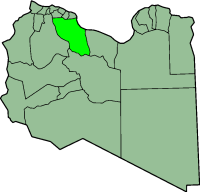
Map showing municipality

Sawfajjin (Arabic: سوفاجين) was one of the baladiyat (municipalities) of Libya from 1987 to 1995. It was in the north of the country with its capital at Bani Walid. Its former land area is now a part of the Sirte District and the Misrata District.
