= Murqub District =

District of Libya

Coordinates: 32°39′N 14°16′E

Murqub المرقب
- District
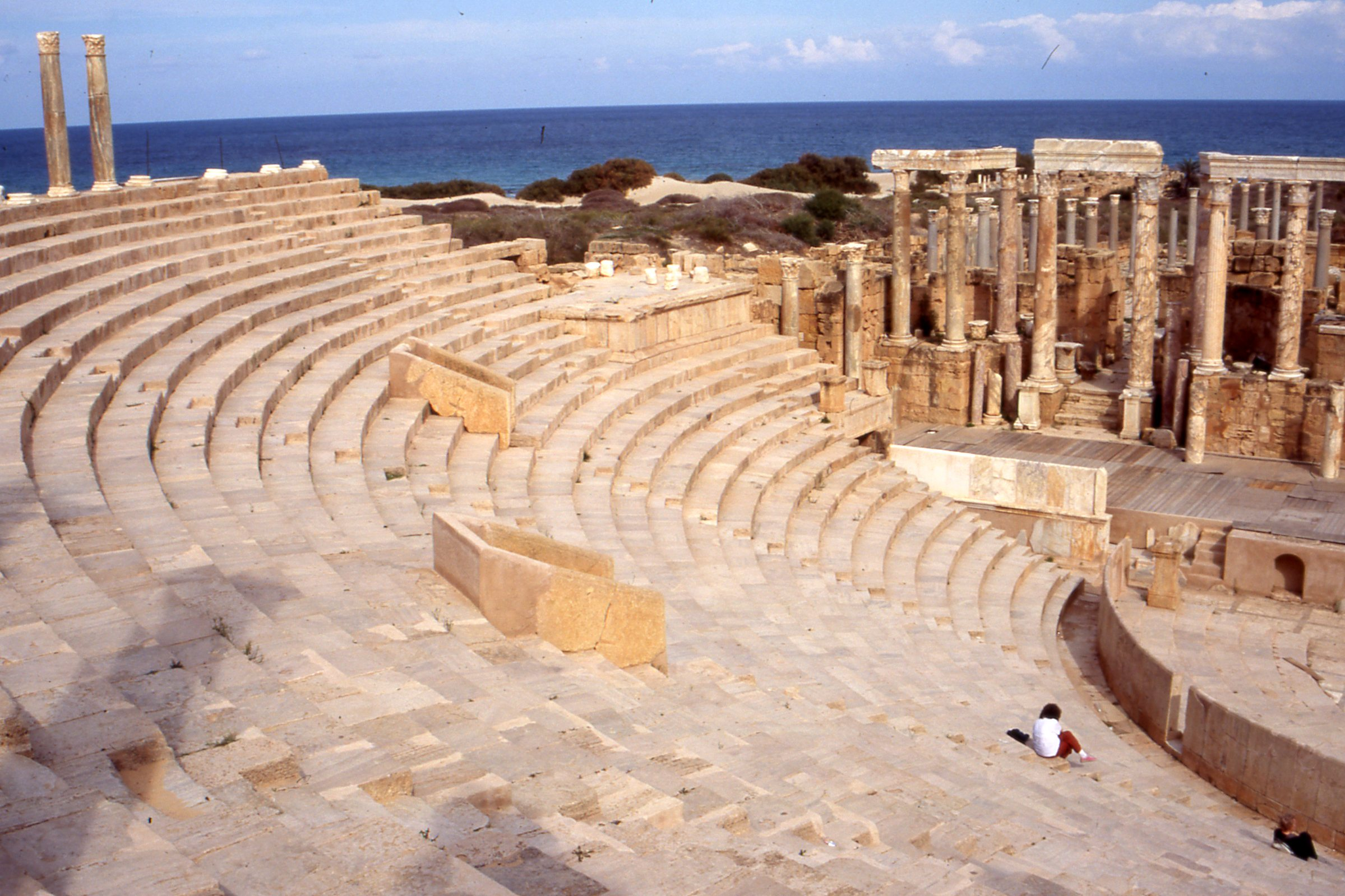
- Leptis Magna, a world heritage site

- Map of Libya with Murqub district highlighted
- Country: Libya
- Capital: Khoms

Population (2006)
  - Total: 432,202
- License Plate Code: 6, 27, 36, 44

Murqub (Arabic: المرقب Al Murqub), sometimes spelt Al Murgub or Al Marqab or al-Morqib, is one of the districts of Libya. The main city and capital is Khoms. The widely visited UNESCO World Heritage Site of Leptis Magna is also located in the district. In the north, Murqub has a shoreline on the Mediterranean Sea. On land, it borders Misrata to the east and south, Tripoli to the northwest and Jabal al Gharbi to the west.

Per the census of 2012, the total population in the region was 157,747 with 150,353 Libyans. The average size of the household in the country was 6.9, with the average size of non-Libyan households being 3.7. There were a total of 22,713 households in the district, with 20,907 Libyan ones. The population density of the district was 1.86 persons per sq. km.

In 2007 the district was enlarged to include twenty-six Basic People's Congresses (townships) of what had been the Tarhuna wa Msalata District.

== Geography ==
In the north, Murqub has a shoreline on the Mediterranean Sea. On land, it borders Misrata to the east and south, Tripoli to the northwest and Jabal al Gharbi to the west. The region is part of Triplotania geographical region that runs from north to south and has set of coastal oases, plains and limestone plateaus having an elevation of 2,000 ft (610 m) to 3,000 ft (910 m). The region receives an annual rainfall of 16 in (410 mm). There are no perennial rivers in the region, but the region is abundant with groundwater aquifers. Most of the major cities of Libya are located in the coastal regions. Libya has mostly a flat undulating plain and occasional plateau, with an average elevation of around 423 m (1,388 ft). Around 91 per cent of the land is covered by desert, with only 8.8 per cent agricultural land (with only 1% arable lands) and 0.1 per cent of forests. The major resources are petroleum, gypsum and natural gas. Along the coastal regions, the climate is Mediterranean in coastal areas, while it is desert climate in all other parts. Dust storms lasting four to eight days is pretty common during Spring. Triplotania is the northwest region, while it is Cyrenacia in the east and Fezzen in southwest.

== Demographics ==
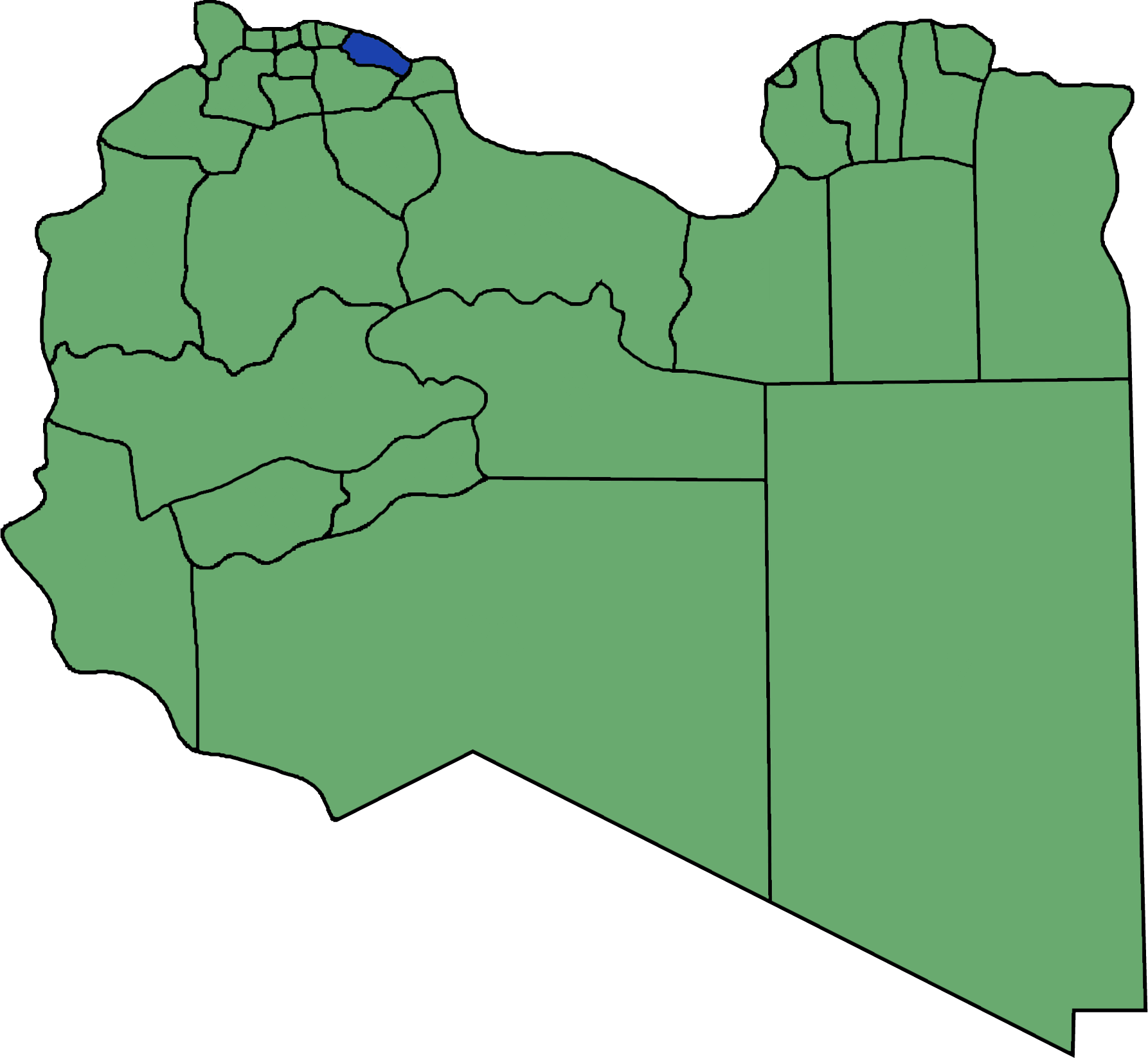
Pre-2007 extent of Murqub District

Per the census of 2012, the total population in the region was 157,747 with 150,353 Libyans. The average size of the household in the country was 6.9, while the average household size of non-Libyans being 3.7. There were totally 22,713 households in the district, with 20,907 Libyan ones. The population density of the district was 1.86 persons per sq. km. Per 2006 census, there were totally 129,943 economically active people in the district. There were 65,417 government employees, 6,568 employers, 51,847 first level workers and 146 second level workers. There were 24,029 workers in state administration, 7,132 in agriculture, animal husbandry and forestry, 8,157 in agriculture & hunting, 35,271 in education, 11,048 in private enterprises, 4,460 in health & social work, 9,292 in production, 31,553 in technical work and 1,300 service workers. The total enrollment in schools was 144,348 and the number of people above secondary stage and less than graduation was 6,136. As per the report from World Health Organization (WHO), there were 1 communicable disease centres, 3 dental clinics, 1 general clinics, 0 in-patient clinics, 9 out-patient clinics, 33 pharmacies, 70 PHC centres, 0 polyclinics, 3 rural clinics and 0 specialized clinics.

== Administration ==
In 2007 Murqub district was enlarged to include twenty-six Basic People's Congresses (townships) of what had been the Tarhuna wa Msalata District. The main city and capital is Khoms. The widely visited UNESCO World Heritage Site of Leptis Magna is also located in the district. Libya became independent in 1951 from the colonial empire and generally known for its oil rich resources. As a part of decentralization in 2012, the country is administratively split into 13 regions from the original 25 municipalities, which were further divided in 1,500 communes. As of 2016, there were 22 administrative divisions in the country in the form of districts.
