= Tripoli District, Libya =

District of Libya

Tripoli طرابلس
- District
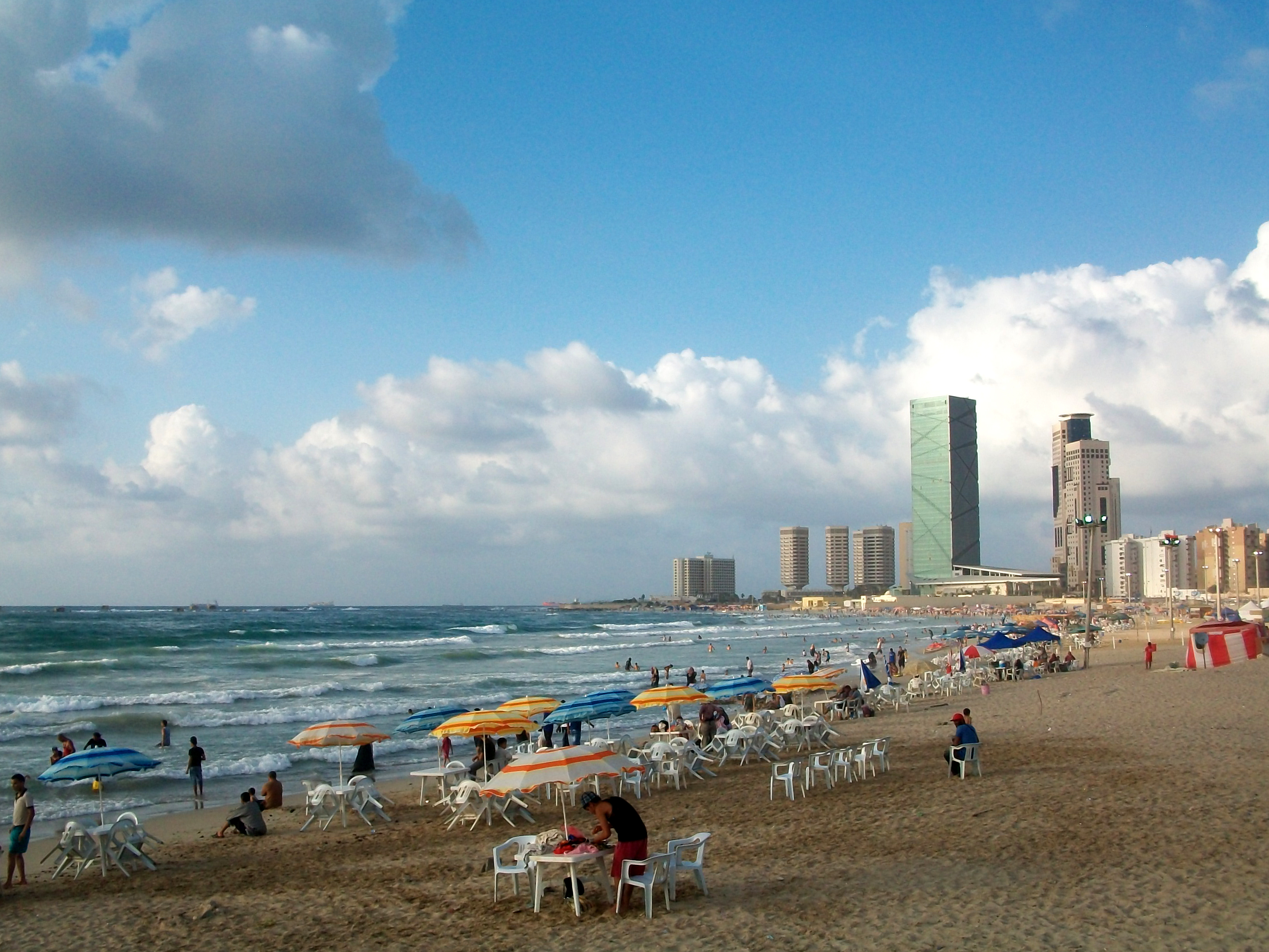
- Tripoli Municipal beach

- Map of Libya with Tripoli district highlighted
- Coordinates: 32°39′N 13°19′E
- Country: Libya
- Capital: Tripoli

Population (2006)
  - Total: 1,065,405
- ISO 3166 code: LY-TB
- License Plate Code: 5, 33, 46, 63

Tripoli District (Arabic: طرابلس عروس البحر, Aros Al baher Ṭarābulus) is one of the 22 first level subdivisions (بلدية) of Libya. Its capital and largest city is Tripoli, the national capital. Tripoli District is in the Tripolitania region of northwestern Libya. The district has a shoreline along the coast of the Mediterranean Sea in the north (Gulf of Tripoli), Zawiya in the west, Jafara in the southwest, Jabal al Gharbi in the south and Murqub in the east.

Per the census estimates of 2012, the total population in the region was 157,747 with 150,353 Libyans. The average size of the household in the country was 6.9, while the average household size of non-Libyans being 3.7. There were totally 22,713 households in the district, with 20,907 Libyan ones. The population density of the district was 1,126 persons per sq. km.

== Geography ==
The district has a shoreline along the coast of the Mediterranean Sea in the north (Gulf of Tripoli). On land it borders the following districts, namely, Zawiya in the west, Jafara in the southwest, Jabal al Gharbi in the south and Murqub in the east. Tripoli district is a part of Triplotania geographical region of Libya that runs from north to south and has set of coastal oases, plains and limestone plateaus having an elevation of 2,000 ft (610 m) to 3,000 ft (910 m). The region receives an annual rainfall of 16 in (410 mm). There are no perennial rivers in the region, but the region is abundant with groundwater aquifers. Libya has mostly a flat undulating plain and occasional plateau, with an average elevation of around 423 m (1,388 ft). Around 91 per cent of the land is covered by desert, with only 8.8 per cent agricultural land (with only 1% arable lands) and 0.1 per cent of forests. Along the coastal regions, the climate is Mediterranean, while it is desert climate in all other parts. Dust storms lasting four to eight days is pretty common during Spring. Triplotania is the northwest region, while it is Cyrenacia in the east and Fezzen in southwest.

== Demographics ==
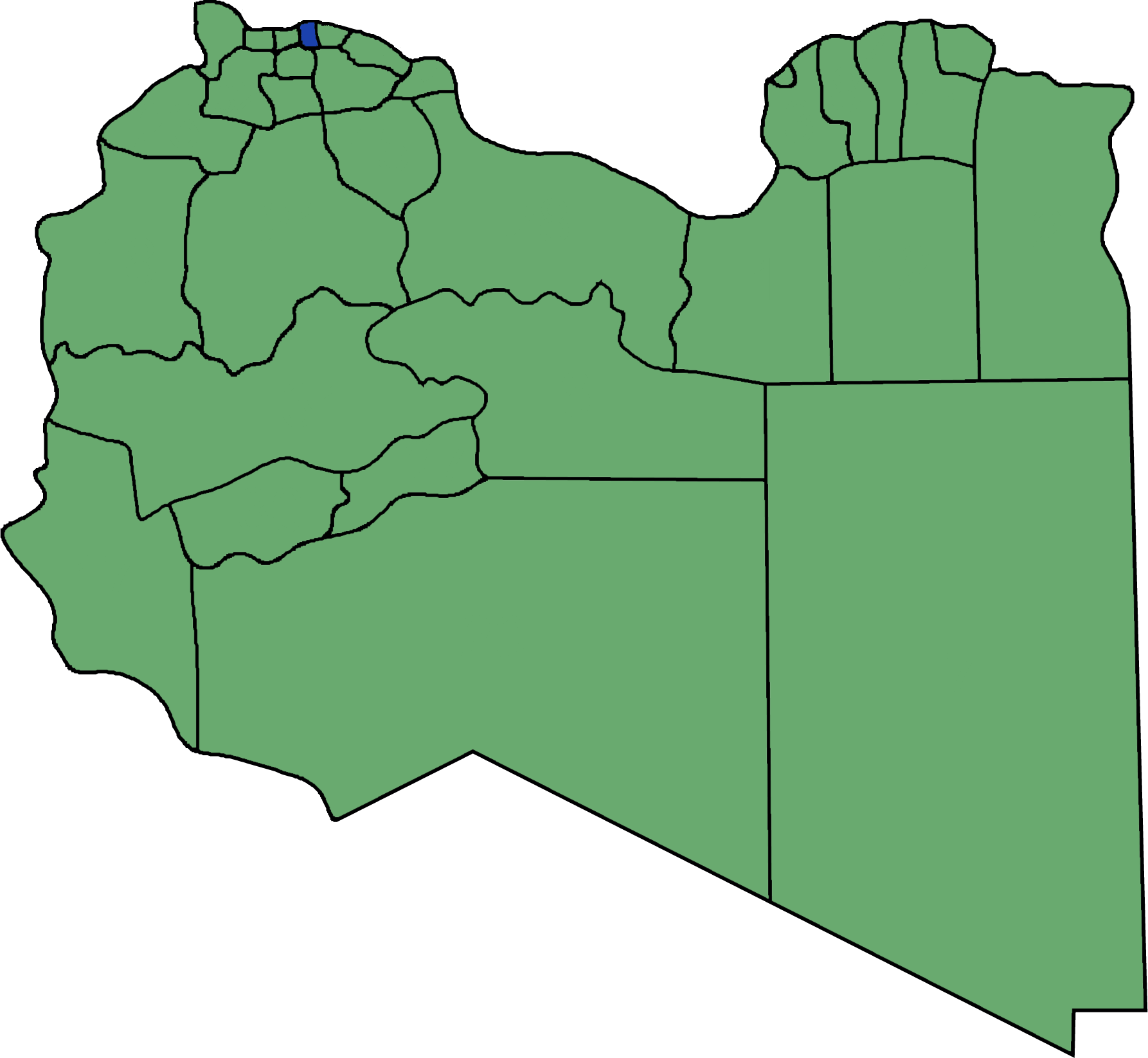
From 1983 to 1995, and from 2001 to 2007

Per the census estimates of 2012, the total population in the region was estimated to be 157,747 with 150,353 Libyans. The average size of the household in the country was 6.9, while the average household size of non-Libyans being 3.7. There were totally 22,713 households in the district, with 20,907 Libyan ones. The population density of the district was 1,126 persons per sq. km. Per 2006 census, there were totally 368,839 economically active people in the district. There were 139,656 government employees, 38,984 employers, 112,950 first level workers and 528 second level workers. There were 59,533 workers in state administration, 28,054 in agriculture, animal husbandry and forestry, 29,126 in agriculture & hunting, 59,328 in education, 43,820 in private enterprises, 12,548 in health & social work, 26,258 in production, 77,831 in technical work and 2,362 service workers. The total enrollment in schools was 323,733 and the number of people above secondary stage and less than graduation was 21,876. As per the report from World Health Organization (WHO), there were one communicable disease centres, 124 dental clinics, four general clinics, 27 in-patient clinics, 126 out-patient clinics, 426 pharmacies, 96 PHC centres, 11 polyclinics, no rural clinics and 9 specialized clinics.

== Administration ==
From 2001 to 2007 the Tripoli District shabiya was smaller than formerly, including only the city of Tripoli and its immediate surroundings. In the 2007 administrative reorganization of Libya the earlier borders of the former Tripoli baladiya (1983–1995) were restored. The most populated places in the district are Castelverde, Qasr bin Ghashir and Tripoli. Libya became independent in 1951 from the colonial empire and generally known for its oil rich resources. As a part of decentralization in 2012, the country is administratively split into 13 regions from the original 25 municipalities, which were further divided in 1,500 communes. As of 2016, there were 22 administrative divisions in the country in the form of districts.
