= Jafara =

District of Libya

Coordinates: 32.15°N 13°E

Jafara الجفارة
- District
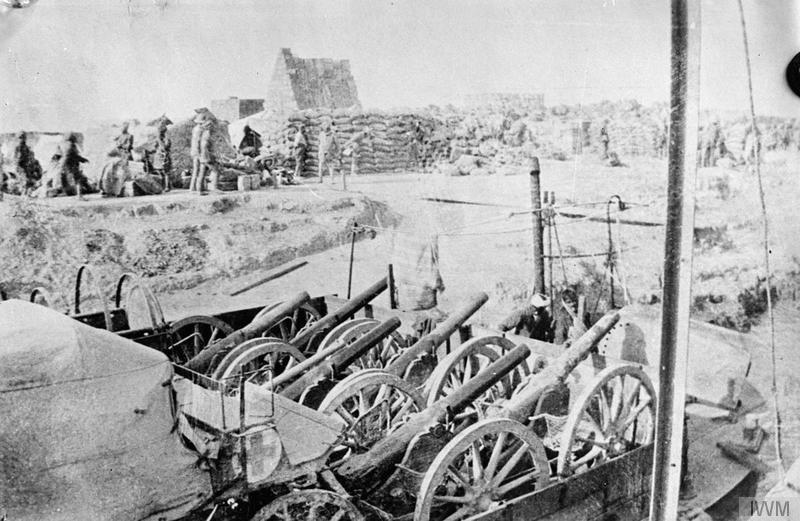

- Map of Libya with Jafara district highlighted
- Country: Libya
- Capital: 'Aziziya

Area
  - Total: 2,660 km^{2} (1,030 sq mi)

Population (2020)
  - Total: 548,855
  - Density: 206/km^{2} (534/sq mi)
- License Plate Code: 25

Jafara or Al Jfara (Arabic: الجفارة Al Jifārah) is one of the districts of Libya, in the historical region of Tripolitania. Its capital and largest city is 'Aziziya. Jafara borders Tripoli in northeast, Jabal al Gharbi in south and Zawiya in the west.

From 2001 to 2007, Jafara District consisted of twenty Basic People's Congresses (BPCs). In 2007 it was enlarged from 1,940 km^{2} to 2,666 km^{2} by the addition of four BPCs from Tarabulus District (Tripoli), and presently consists of twenty-four Basic People's Congresses.

Per the census of 2012, the total population in the region was 157,747, with 150,353 Libyans. The average size of the household in the country was 6.9, while the average household size of non-Libyans was 3.7. There were in total 22,713 households in the district, 20,907 of which were Libyan ones. The population density of the district was 1.86 persons per km^{2}. Per 2006 census, there were a total of 163,882 economically active people in the district.

== Geography ==
Libya has mostly a flat undulating plain and occasional plateau, with an average elevation of around 423 m (1,388 ft). Around 91 per cent of the land is covered by desert, with only 8.8 per cent agricultural land (with only 1% arable lands) and 0.1 per cent of forests. The major resources are petroleum, gypsum and natural gas. Along the coastal regions, the climate is Mediterranean in coastal areas, while it is desert climate in all other parts. Dust storms lasting four to eight days is pretty common during Spring. Tripolitania is the northwest region, while it is Cyrenacia in the east and Fezzen in southwest. Tripolitania runs from north to south and has set of coastal oases, plains and limestone plateaus having an elevation of 2,000 ft (610 m) to 3,000 ft (910 m). The region receives an annual rainfall of 16 in (410 mm). There are no perennial rivers in the region, but the region is abundant with groundwater aquifers. Most of the major cities of Libya are located in the coastal regions.

== Demographics ==
Per the census of 2012, the total population in the region was 157,747 with 150,353 Libyans. The average size of the household in the country was 6.9, while the average household size of non-Libyans being 3.7. There were totally 22,713 households in the district, with 20,907 Libyan ones. The population density of the district was 1.86 persons per km^{2}. Per 2006 census, there were totally 163,882 economically active people in the district. There were 70,302 government employees, 11,686 employers, 52,059 first level workers and 137 second level workers. There were 24,725 workers in state administration, 15,019 in agriculture, animal husbandry and forestry, 17,617 in agriculture & hunting, 37,258 in education, 15,915 in private enterprises, 5,240 in health & social work, 8,912 in production, 41,237 in technical work and 1,367 service workers. The total enrollment in schools was 140,085 and the number of people above secondary stage and less than graduation was 9,802. As per the report from World Health Organization (WHO), there were 0 communicable disease centres, 7 dental clinics, 0 general clinics, 1 in-patient clinics, 26 out-patient clinics, 135 pharmacies, 121 PHC centres, 0 polyclinics, 0 rural clinics and 1 specialized clinics. Islam is the state and major religion of the country.

== Local administration ==
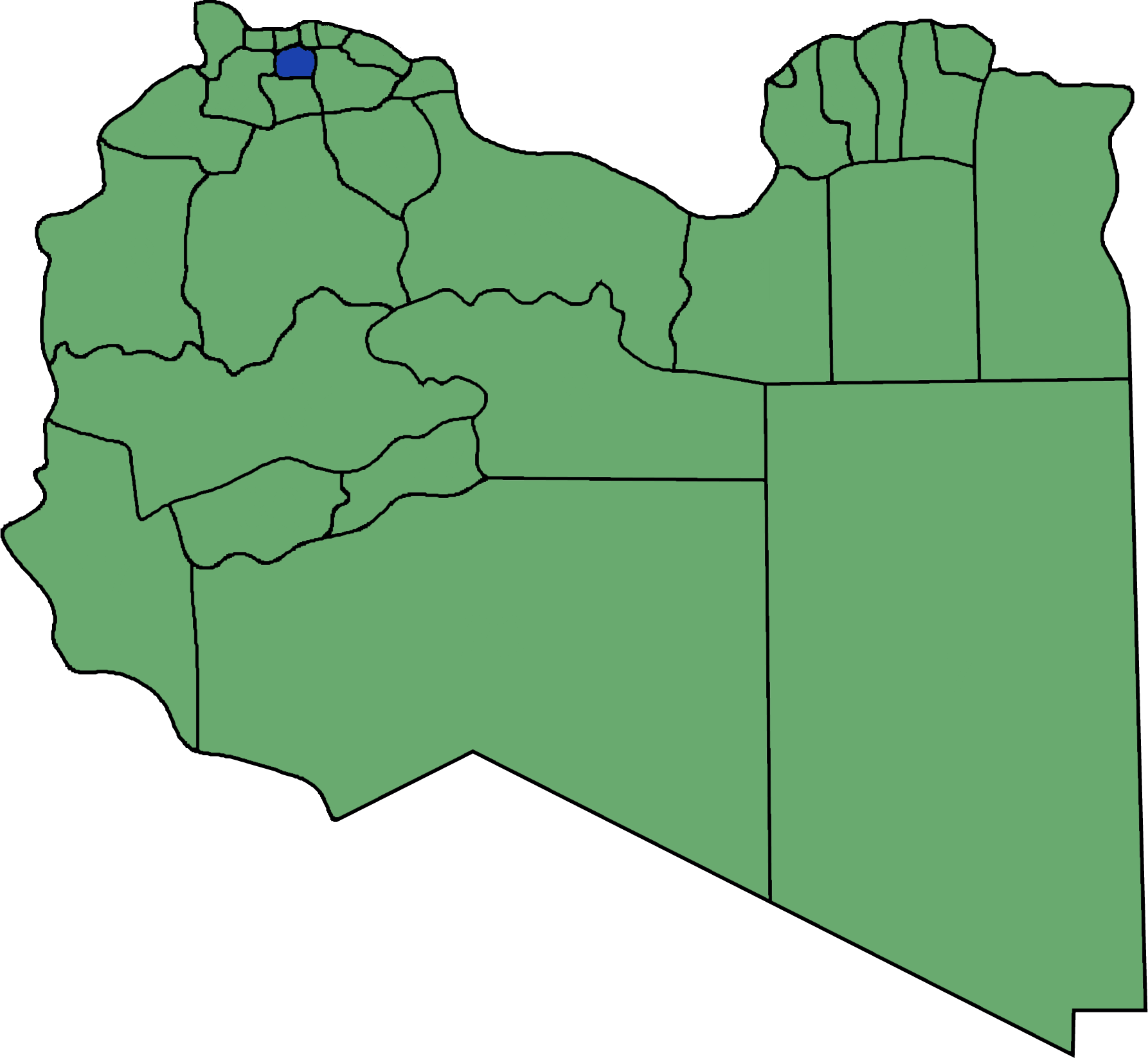
The same district between 2001 and 2007.

Libya became independent in 1951 from the colonial empire and generally known for its oil rich resources. All the powers rested centrally with the Brotherly Leader Gaddafi for 42 years till the 2011 armed rebellion which topple him. As per the constitution, Libya is the most decentralized Arab nation, but practically all powers are vested on central government on account of control over the oil revenues. Local governmental institutions manage the administration of education, industry, and communities. As a part of decentralization in 2012, the country is administratively split into 13 regions from the original 25 municipalities, which were further divided in 1,500 communes. Since 2015, the chief of the state is a chairman of Presidential Council, while the prime minister is the head of the state. The House of Representatives is an elected body that is elected on universal suffrage and popular vote. As of 2016, there were 22 administrative divisions in the country in the form of districts.
