= Battle of Zintan =

Battle during the Libyan Civil War

- Part of Libyan Civil War and Nafusa Mountains campaign
Date	March 20 – June 13, 2011
Location	Zintan, Libya
Result	Anti-Gaddafi victory
Territorial changes	Rebels take full control over the entire city

Belligerents
(History of Libya under Muammar Gaddafi) Armed forces of the Libyan Arab Jamahiriya	(Libya) Anti-Gaddafi forces: Zintan Brigades; Misrata Brigades; National Liberation Army

Commanders and leaders
(History of Libya under Muammar Gaddafi) Muammar Gaddafi	(Libya) Abdul Fatah Younis

Strength
200–550 soldiers, 40-50 tanks, and 8 MRLs	200–700 rebels

Casualties and losses
Unknown	Around 300 fatalities (Including civilians and rebels)

The Battle of Zintan (Arabic: معركة زنتان), was a significant conflict that took place during the 2011 Libyan Civil War. Zintan, a town in northwestern Libya, was a stronghold of anti-Gaddafi forces. The battle primarily involved rebel fighters from Zintan and government loyalist forces. The rebels managed to capture the town and defend it against repeated attacks by Gaddafi's forces. The battle highlighted the determination of the rebels to resist Gaddafi's rule. Ultimately, the rebels were successful in maintaining control of Zintan, which played a role in the broader effort to overthrow Gaddafi's regime.

== Background ==
The Libyan Civil War began in February 2011 as part of the broader wave of protests against autocratic governments in the region. In Libya, these protests quickly escalated into a violent conflict between the regime of Colonel Muammar Gaddafi and various opposition groups, including rebels, defected military personnel, and civilians who sought to overthrow his regime.

Zintan, a town located in the western part of Libya, became a focal point in the conflict due to its strategic location and its residents' opposition to Gaddafi's rule. The town's population was known for its resistance to the Gaddafi regime, and as the civil war unfolded, Zintan became an important hub for anti-government forces.

== Battle ==
The Battle of Zintan specifically refers to the clashes that occurred between pro-Gaddafi forces and anti-government rebels in and around the town of Zintan. Pro-Gaddafi forces, including loyalist military units and mercenaries, attempted to regain control of the town and suppress the rebellion. However, the rebels, with the support of some defecting military personnel and international assistance, managed to hold their ground and defend Zintan against the pro-Gaddafi forces.

The battle was characterized by intense fighting, including urban combat and skirmishes in the surrounding areas. The anti-Gaddafi forces in Zintan were often outgunned and outnumbered, but their determination and local knowledge of the terrain allowed them to mount a successful defense.

== Outcome ==
The Battle of Zintan in the Libyan Civil War of 2011 was a pivotal victory for anti-Gaddafi forces, where they successfully defended the town against pro-Gaddafi troops. This triumph boosted rebel morale, demonstrated the potential to overcome odds, and drew international attention to the conflict. Zintan's strategic location near the Nafusa Mountains was crucial, and the battle highlighted the broader struggle against Gaddafi's rule. Despite its significance, the battle didn't end the conflict; Libya continued to face political challenges and violence after Gaddafi's fall. Zintan remains a symbol of resistance and resilience, embodying the determination of the Libyan people.

== See also ==
- Battle of Bani Walid
- First Battle of Benghazi
- Second Battle of Benghazi
- Battle of Misrata
- Battle of Tripoli
- Battle of Wazzin
- Raid on Ras Lanuf
