= Battle of Gharyan (2011) =

Battle during the Nafusa Mountains campaign

Coordinates: 32°10′11″N 13°01′00″E

- Part of the Nafusa Mountains campaign
| Date | 13–18 August 2011 |
| Location | Gharyan, Libya |
| Result | Anti-Gaddafi victory |

Belligerents
| (Libya) Anti-Gaddafi forces: National Liberation Army; (United Nations) UNSC forces: NATO air forces | (Libya) Armed forces of the Libyan Arab Jamahiriya |

Commanders and leaders
| Unknown | Unknown |

Strength
| 5,000 | Sabhan Brigade: 400 |

Casualties and losses
| 35 killed | Unknown |

The Battle of Gharyan took place during the Libyan Civil War between rebel anti-Gaddafi forces and forces loyal to Muammar Gaddafi for control of the Tripolitanian city of Gharyan located at the eastern edge of the Nafusa Mountains.

== Background ==
Following large scale protests across the country, what would soon become part of the organized opposition in Libya gained control over most of the Nafusa mountains. Gharyan was soon captured by the rebels however as part of the offensive to retake control of Libya from the rebels, Gaddafi quickly dispatched units to regain control. During the night between the 1 and 2 March, loyalist forces came into the town, under the cover of darkness. On the morning of 2 March, the rebels realised that the town was overrun by government troops. Soldiers had a list of opposition members and started to round up all of the rebels in Gharyan. Gharyan had been retaken by the government.

Following the defeat of Gaddafi forces in Yafran and Kikla, rebel forces began to make preparations for an attack on Gharyan. On 6 July, Rebels captured Al-Qawalish and advanced on Asabah. However a Gaddafi counterattack was able to hold them back and temporarily recaptured Al-Qawalish.

== The battle ==
On 13 August, rebel forces attacked Gharyan. It was reported that the rebels were initially successful as Gaddafi forces retreated, however they later regrouped and attacked. On 14 August, the Rebels stated that they controlled "70 percent" of the city. A fighter in Al-Qawalish said he heard that loyalist troops were retreating from Gharyan. On 15 August, the rebels claimed they had "full control" of the city. A spokesman for the rebel military council in the Nafusa Mountains asserted, "Gharyan is fully in the hands of the revolutionaries. They crushed the Sahban Brigade, the main command center for Gaddafi in the Western Mountains. They took the brigade's heavy and light weapons."

On 16 August, governmental spokesman Moussa Ibrahim stated that governmental troops would soon retake Gharyan, implicitly supporting the rebel account that Gharyan had been taken. Reuters confirmed that Gharyan was in rebel hands, with rebel forces positioned in the city centre with a T-34 tank.

On 17 August, continued fighting in the city was reported.

On 18 August, loyalists fully withdrew from the city, which was confirmed by a Reuters correspondent. The loyalists had retreated north to 'Aziziya.

== Aftermath ==
On 15 August, rebels claimed to have moved south from Gharyan after the battle, and taken the military base of Mizda, gaining access to the Libyan Army's military supplies stored there. Mizda lies near a strategic junction between roads to Gharyan, Bani Walid, and Sabha.
