= Mohammed Ali Madani =

- Born: Libya
- Died: 1 May 2011 Zintan, Libya
- Allegiance: Libyan Arab Jamahiriya (until 2011 Libyan civil war) (Libya) National Transitional Council (2011)
- Branch: National Liberation Army
- Rank: Commander
- Conflicts: 2011 Libyan civil war *2011 Nafusa Mountain Campaign

Mohammed Ali Madani was the leader of the Zintan Brigade of the anti-Gaddafi forces during the 2011 Libyan civil war, until his death during the Nafusa Mountains Campaign from bullets fired by pro-Gaddafi forces.

Madani was a member of the former elite Saiqa Libyan army division and had fought in Chad. He was known as a man of great charisma and military experience. After his death, his son, Salah, led the brigade into Tripoli.
