= Timeline of the 2011 military intervention in Libya =

This is a timeline of the 2011 military intervention in Libya. It covers all military action taken by NATO to implement United Nations Security Council Resolution 1973, beginning on 19 March 2011.

== March ==
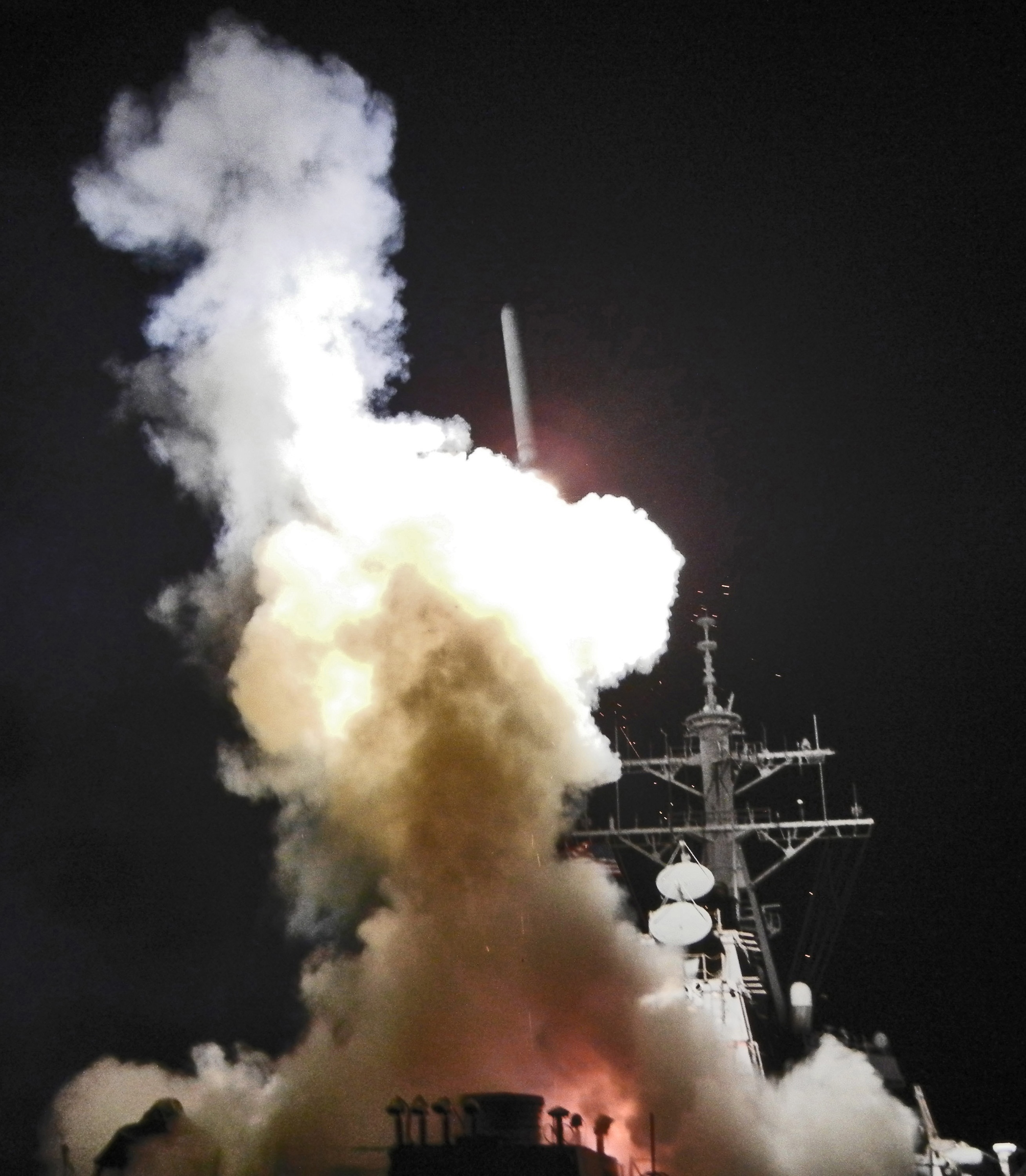
The American destroyer USS Barry launches one of the Tomahawk missiles fired by the coalition

19 March: BBC News reported at 16:00 GMT that the French Air Force had sent 19 fighter planes to cover an area of 100 by 150 km (62 by 93 mi) over Benghazi to prevent any attacks on the rebel-controlled city. "Our air force will oppose any aggression by Colonel Gaddafi against the population of Benghazi", said French President Nicolas Sarkozy. BBC News reported at 16:59 GMT that at 16:45 GMT a French plane had fired at and destroyed a Libyan military vehicle – this being confirmed by French defence ministry spokesman Laurent Teisseire.

According to Al Jazeera, French aircraft destroyed four Libyan tanks in air strikes to the south-west of Benghazi. The French military claimed that its aircraft had also flown reconnaissance missions over "all Libyan territory". On the same day, British Prime Minister David Cameron confirmed that Royal Air Force jets were also in action and reports suggested that the US Navy had fired the first cruise missile. CBS News's David Martin reported that three B-2 stealth bombers flew non-stop from the US to drop 40 bombs on a major Libyan airfield. Martin further reported that US fighter jets were searching for Libyan ground forces to attack.

The Pentagon and the British Ministry of Defence confirmed that, jointly, HMS Triumph and United States Navy ships (including USS Barry, pictured) and submarines fired more than 110 Tomahawk cruise missiles, supported with air attacks on military installations, both inland and on the coast.

At the start of operations United States Africa Command commanded by General Carter Ham exercised strategic command. Tactical command in the theater of operations was executed from USS Mount Whitney in the Mediterranean Sea under command of Admiral Sam Locklear, commander United States Naval Forces Europe. United States Secretary of Defense Robert Gates indicated that control of the operation would be transferred to French and British authorities, or NATO, within days.

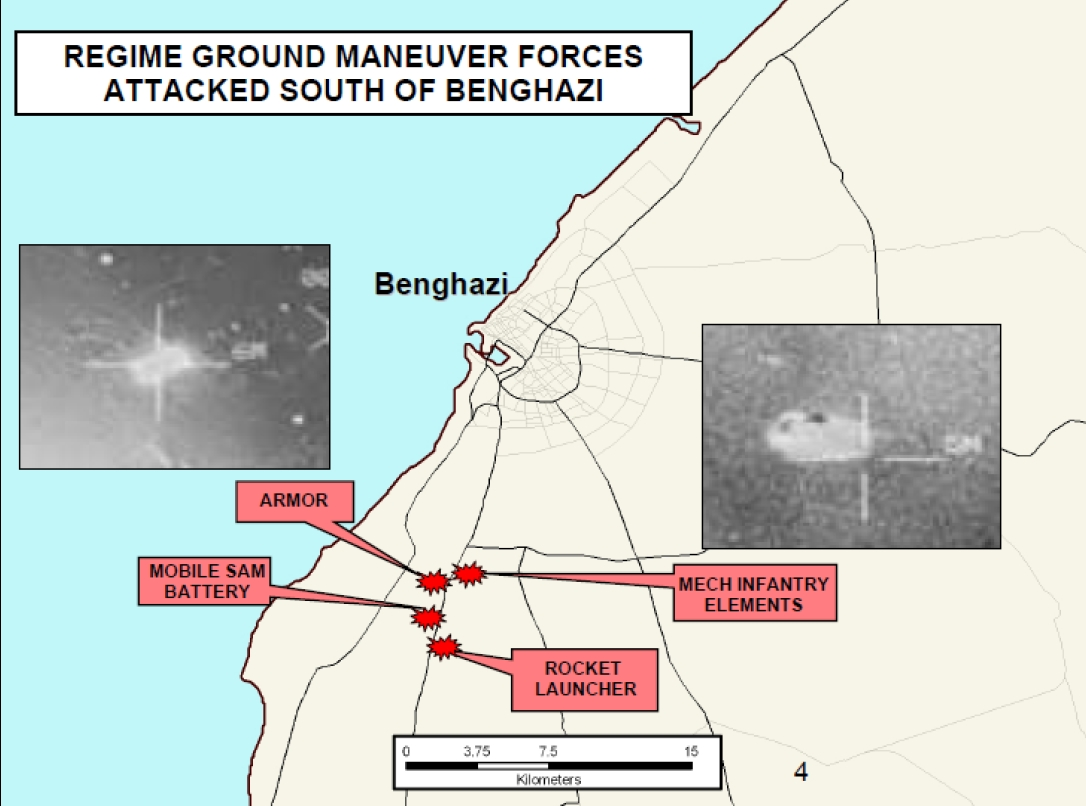
Libyan Forces attacked south of Benghazi

20 March: Several Storm Shadow missiles were launched by British jets. Nineteen US planes conducted strike operations in Libya. The planes included Marine Corps AV-8B Harriers, US Navy EA-18G Growlers, which were diverted from operations over Iraq and jammed Libyan radar and communications, and Air Force F-15 and F-16 fighter jets. A military convoy was destroyed south of Benghazi by air strikes. Seventy military vehicles are known to have been destroyed, multiple loyalist ground troop casualties were also reported.

Four Danish F-16 fighters left Italy's Sigonella air base for a successful five-hour-long "high-risk mission", and four Italian Tornados ECR, accompanied by four Italian F-16 as fighter escorts took off from the Trapani base. A second immediate cease-fire was declared by the Libyan Army on 20 March, starting at 9 pm.

21 March: SA-2, SA-3 and SA-5 air defence systems in Libya have been destroyed by Italian aircraft during a raid near Tripoli. Only SA-6, hand-held SA-7s and SA-8 mobile SAMs remain a possible threat to aircraft. A spokesman for the National Transitional Council said Gaddafi's forces were using human shields in defence of their military assets, bringing civilians to Misrata to surround their vehicles and troops to deter airstrikes. RAF Tornados aborted a planned airstrike due to information that a number of civilians were reported close to the intended target. Among the buildings hit late on 20 March and early 21 March were parts of the Bab al-Azizia compound often used by Colonel Gaddafi. Further strikes on Tripoli and, according to Libyan government spokesmen, Sabha and Sirte, took place on late 21 March.

22 March: During a mission over Libya, a US F-15E crashed in rebel-held territory. It was reported that the aircraft, based at RAF Lakenheath in England, came down following a mechanical fault. Both crewmen were rescued by a US CSAR unit, but six local villagers were injured by gunfire from the rescuing US forces. There are claims that the pilot called in a bomb strike by Harrier jump jets, possibly injuring the civilians. The US announced that Qatari forces would join the operation by the weekend.

23 March: Coalition aircraft flew at least two bombing missions against loyalist forces near the besieged city of Misrata. Late in the day, it was announced that the remaining pro-Gaddafi forces and their equipment in the city, with the exception of individual snipers, had been forced to retreat or had been destroyed. In the early morning hours, four Canadian Forces CF-18 Hornets conducted two separate bombing runs on multiple targets at a pro-Gaddafi munitions depot near Misrata. NATO announced it would enforce the UN embargo to "cut off the flow of arms and mercenaries" under the name Operation Unified Protector.

24 March: Multiple Tomahawk cruise missiles were launched at targets during the day. French aircraft attacked Al Jufra Air Base 250 kilometres (160 mi) inland and destroyed a Libyan Soko G-2 Galeb light attack jet as it landed at Misrata Airport. Eyewitnesses reported that coalition aircraft had bombed Sabha Air Base, 620 kilometres (390 mi) south of Tripoli. F-16s from the Royal Norwegian Air Force were assigned to the US African command and Operation Odyssey Dawn. A number of Norwegian F-16s took off from Souda Bay Air Base on Crete, Greece, performing several missions over Libya during the day, evening and through the night.

25 March: Three laser-guided bombs were launched from two F-16s of the Royal Norwegian Air Force against Libyan tanks. French Air Force destroyed an artillery battery overnight outside Ajdabiya. RAF Tornado fighter/bombers together with the French Air Force struck and destroyed seven pro-Gaddafi tanks dug in on the outskirts of Ajdabiya with precision guided munitions.

26 March: F-16s from the Royal Norwegian Air Force bombed an airfield in Libya during the night. Two CF-18s from the Canadian Forces detachment conducted one sortie each, on a mission to release precision-guided munitions against electronic warfare sites near Misrata. French Air Force confirms the destruction by its aircraft of at least 5 Libyan Soko G-2 Galeb aircraft and 2 Mi-35 military helicopters. RAF Tornados destroyed three armoured vehicles in Misrata and a further two vehicles in Ajdabiya with Brimstone missiles. Royal Danish Air Force (RDAF) F-16s knocked out Libyan self-propelled rocket launchers and tanks.

27 March: RDAF F-16s knocked out Libyan self-propelled artillery south of Tripoli.

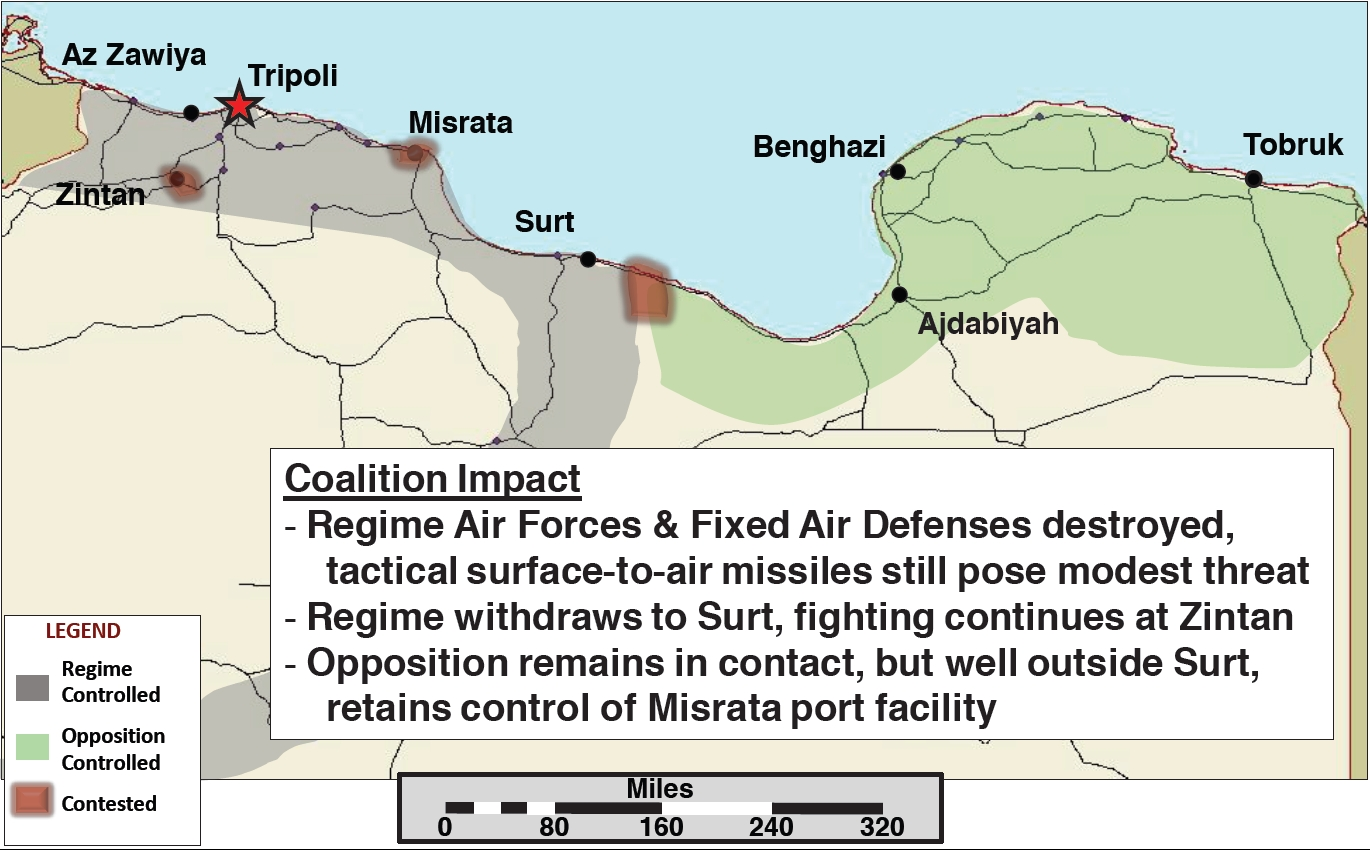
US Military map showing the situation of 28 March 2011

4 Canadian Forces CF-18s struck and destroyed Regime ammunition bunkers 92 km south of Misrata. Air Force and Navy Rafales attacked a command centre south of Tripoli. French and Qatari Mirage 2000-5s conducted joint patrols and air interdiction missions from Souda Air Base. The number of French Mirage 2000-5s based as Souda was increased to four.

28 March: RAF Tornados destroyed two Libyan tanks and two armoured vehicles near Misrata earlier in the day. The Ministry of Defence said British jets had launched missiles against ammunition bunkers in the morning in the Sabha area of southern Libya. Air operations were planned to focus on the region around Zintan and Misrata. A US Navy P-3 Orion Maritime Patrol aircraft fired at the 12-meter Libyan Coast Guard vessel Vittoria after multiple explosions were seen near the Libyan port of Misrata Monday evening forcing it to be beached. The USAF said an A-10 Thunderbolt also fired on two smaller Libyan vessels traveling with the larger ship, destroying one and forcing the other to be abandoned. Air force Rafales and Mirage 2000Ds and a joint patrol of Navy Rafales and Super Etendards bombed an ammunition dump at Gharyan, 100 kilometres (62 mi) south of Tripoli. Mirage F1CRs conducted reconnaissance missions for the first time in the operation.

29 March: The US used AC-130 gunships and A-10 Thunderbolt tankbusters against Muammar Gaddafi's troops in Libya. US aircraft fired on a Libyan coast guard vessel, forcing it to limp to shore, after it launched missiles at merchant ships in the port of Misrata, U.S. military officials said Tuesday. Two patrols of Air Force Rafales and Mirage 2000Ds and a patrol of Navy Rafales and Super Etendards attacked anti-aircraft missile sites 100 kilometres (62 mi) south west of Tripoli. Two joint patrols of French and Qatari Mirage 2000-5s conducted air interdiction sorties. Mirage 2000Ds and Super Etendards bombed a military depot 30 kilometres (19 mi) south of Tripoli. 2 Canadian Forces CF-18s flew on a mission to help the rebels by attacking targets in Misrata.

30 March: A joint strike force of French Air Force Rafales and Mirage 2000Ds and Navy Rafales and Super Etendards attacked anti-aircraft missile sites 20 kilometres (12 mi) south of Sirte. A patrol of two French and four Qatari Mirage 2000-5s conducted air interdiction sorties. RAF Tornados flying from Gioia del Colle engaged near Misrata three Libyan tanks, two armoured fighting vehicles and a surface-to-air missile site with Brimstone missiles and Paveway IV bombs.

31 March: At 0600 GMT, NATO took command of all operations in Libya. Subsequent operations were conducted as part of Operation Unified Protector.

== April ==
1 April: A coalition air strike near Brega killed at least 13 people after a rebel convoy was fired upon. A NATO A-10 Thunderbolt II aircraft was believed to attack after an anti-aircraft gun was fired from the convoy. In the same region, up to seven civilians were reported to have been killed and 25 injured after an attack on an ammunition truck triggered an explosion that destroyed several buildings. French patrol Mirage 2000D and Super Etendard a strike on a car was conducted in Khoms, located west of Misrata.

2 April: French Navy Rafale fighter jets destroyed five tanks in Sirte.

3 April: French Air Force destroyed several armored vehicles in Ra's Lanuf.

4 April: A US Marine Corps AV-8B Harrier and a US Air Force A-10 Thunderbolt II flew missions near Sirte and Brega, respectively. 4 April also marked the last day of US armed forces taking an active role in military action, as all American forces were placed in reserve that evening, to be used only if requested by NATO.

5 April: Fighter jets from Jordan flew missions from an unidentified European airbase to escort transport aircraft delivering humanitarian aid in eastern Libya. NATO aircraft flew fourteen sorties near Misrata, attacking anti-aircraft installations and ground vehicles.

6 April: RAF Tornados flew missions around rebel-held Misrata and Sirte. The targets were six armoured fighting vehicles and six battle tanks. Two Typhoon aircraft had flown from Gioia del Colle air base, southern Italy, to police the no-fly zone, while two RAF VC10 aircraft provided air-to-air refuelling. The RAF announced four Typhoon jets will join 16 RAF ground-attack aircraft already under NATO command.

8 April: NATO aircraft attacked a column of rebel tanks, killing five rebels.

9 April: NATO warplanes forced a rebel MiG-23 to land. The fighter jet took off from an airfield east of Benghazi and was detected by an airborne early-warning airplane. This was the first no-fly zone violation by any aircraft since NATO took command. Also, an anonymous NATO official claimed that they had destroyed seventeen and damaged nine loyalist tanks in and around Misrata and Brega in the previous two days, of which five were destroyed by British planes. However, there was no independent confirmation of the claims, though footage of three tanks destroyed had surfaced.

10 April: NATO claimed to have hit 11 tanks or armored vehicles in the early part of the day outside Ajdabiya. A Reuters correspondent saw 15 charred corpses of Gaddafi's forces near several destroyed armored vehicles.

11 April: 4 tanks in Zintan and 1 ammunition storage site south of Sirte were hit.

12 April: RAF Typhoon aircraft were used operationally in a ground attack role for the first time. A Typhoon destroyed two main battle tanks near Misrata with Paveway II whilst a Tornado destroyed the third with Paveway IV. In total, RAF aircraft destroyed eight main battle tanks on 12 April. Since the start of Operation ELLAMY up until 12 April.

13 April: 13 bunkers, 1 tank, and 1 APC in Tripoli, and 3 multiple rocket launchers in Brega were hit.

14 April: 4 Ammunition sites, 8 bunkers, and 2 APCs in Sirte, an SA-3 radar and launcher at the Tunisian Border, 3 bunkers and a helicopter near Misrata, and 2 Ammunition sites, 1 radar, and 1 tank in Tripoli were hit.

15 April: Three airstrikes in Tripoli were carried out, targeting a missile installation and two unidentified targets.

16 April: 42 sorties were flown, occurring in several cities. Near Tripoli, two ammunition storage facilities and an antiaircraft station were destroyed. Near Misrata, six armored ground vehicle was destroyed. Near Sirte, several pieces of ground-based heavy weaponry and four ammunition facilities were destroyed. Near Zintan, an ammunition facility was damaged.

17 April: NATO flew 145 missions, of which 60 attacked targets. Near Tripoli, seven ammunition facilities were destroyed. Near Misrata, four radar installations were destroyed. Near Sirte, aircraft and 1 ammunition facilities were destroyed. Near Zintan, air defense and one ammunition facility were destroyed.

18 April: 9 ammunition sites and the headquarters of the 32nd Brigade in Tripoli, 6 SAM launchers, 4 tanks, 3 anti-air missile sites, and a mobile rocket launcher in Misrata, 3 ammunition bunkers in Sirte, 3 tanks, an anti-aircraft weapons system, and an armored vehicle in Zintan, and 1 building in Brega were hit.

19 April: Missions were flown to attack Gaddafi's command center in Tripoli.

21 April: US Predator drones entered the theater. According to General James Cartwright, two patrols of drones would be above Libya at all times, with the first deployment originally scheduled for 21 April, though inclement weather forced a delay.
23 April: The first successful attack using drones was carried out, according to The Pentagon, though no further information was provided.
25 April: Norwegian F-16s attacked the command center and residence of Muammar Gaddafi in Tripoli; government officials claimed it was an assassination attempt, but the US military said it was an attack on a military target. Other strikes took place in Misrata and Sirte, destroying four rocket launchers, eight personnel carriers and one vehicle and three ammunition storage or bunker facilities.
26 April: 133 sorties carried out by NATO aircraft, 56 of which attacked targets. Tanks, missile and rocket launchers, various storage facilities and other vehicles were targeted in Tripoli, Misrata, Sirte and Khoms.
27 April: Rebel forces claimed a NATO airstrike killed around 12 rebels in Misrata in a friendly fire incident. Elsewhere, 119 sorties were carried out by NATO aircraft, 41 of which engaged targets, mostly targeting weapons storage facilities, as well as several rocket or missile launchers.
30 April: The Libyan government claimed a NATO airstrike killed Saif al-Arab Gaddafi and three of Muammar Gaddafi's grandchildren in an apparent assassination attempt on the leader. They took journalists to tour what appeared to be a residential house in a wealthy section of Tripoli that had been hit by at least three missiles, but did not show them the bodies of the purported dead.

== May ==
1 May: NATO air strikes destroyed 45 government vehicles after they were used in attacks that killed five civilians in Jalu and Awjila. After attacks on its Embassy, the British Government expelled the Libyan Ambassador from the United Kingdom. Later, the British Embassy in Tripoli was completely burnt down. British Foreign Secretary William Hague said that the government's actions broke the Vienna Convention, as they are required to "protect diplomatic missions." International staff of the UN also pulled out of Tripoli following attacks.
2 May: NATO aircraft flew 158 sorties, 56 of which were intended as strike sorties. Targets included 13 ammunition stores, one truck-mounted gun, three self-propelled guns, two armored personnel carriers and rocket launchers; these strikes occurred in Misrata, Ra's Lanuf, Brega and Zintan.
3 May: NATO conducted 161 sorties, including 62 strike sorties. Key hits include two ammunition storage areas in Tripoli, two ammunition storage areas and one armored fighting vehicle in Zintan, three ammunition storage areas and three tanks near Misrata, two tanks in Sirte, and two rocket launchers and one tank in Ra's Lanuf.
4 May: NATO aircraft conducted 160 sorties, 49 of which were intended as strike sorties. Targets included two ammunition stores, one bunker, seven military vehicles, and rocket launchers; strikes were carried out in Tripoli, Misrata, Ajdabiya and Sirte.
5 May: NATO flew 154 sorties, of which 57 were strike sorties. Targets include nine ammunition storage depots, three tanks, two armored fighting vehicles, two rocket launchers, two truck-mounted guns, and one resupply facility in Zintan, eight ammunition storage facilities in Sirte, three rocket launchers in Brega, three ammunition storage facilities in Mizda, one tank near Misrata and one communications facility in Ra's Lanuf.
6 May: NATO aircraft flew 149 sorties, 56 of which were planned to fire on targets. Nine military vehicles, seven tanks, 12 ammunition storage facilities, a building housing snipers, rocket and missile launchers and command centers in Sirte and Ra's Lanuf were targeted.
7 May: NATO aircraft flew 153 sorties on 7 May, 58 of which were intended as strike sorties to identify and/or attack targets. Targets attacked included 16 weapons storage facilities near Zintan, 34 vehicles, one anti-aircraft gun, and Scud rocket launchers near Sirte, which were destroyed by British Tornado aircraft.
8 May: 159 sorties were flown by NATO aircraft, of which 64 were strike sorties. Aircraft attacked 32 weapons storage facilities near Zintan, 25 vehicles, three buildings hosting active shooters, as well as government buildings in Tripoli.
9 May: 146 sorties, including 46 strike sorties were flown. Key hits include three command and control facilities in Tripoli, 15 ammunition depots in Mizda, one tank and one command and control node near Misrata, and two ammunition storage facility in Sirte.
10 May: 123 sorties were flown, including 42 strike sorties. Targets include six vehicle storage depots, three ammunition storage depots, one self-propelled anti-aircraft gun, and one SAM Launcher in Tripoli, one ammunition storage building in Mizda, and three ammunition storage buildings in Qaryat.
11 May: 141 sorties were conducted, of which 46 were intended to engage targets. Targets hit were four ammunition storage facilities, four command and control centers, and two SAM Launchers in Tripoli, four SAM Launchers in Sorman, and one SAM Launcher near Misrata.
12 May: NATO flew 135 sorties, including 52 strike sorties. Key hits were two SAM Launchers and three buildings in a military camp in Tripoli, one SAM Launcher, two buildings, one truck-mounted gun, and one anti-aircraft gun near Misrata, ten ammo storage buildings near Al Qaryat, five ammo storage buildings and one command and control node in Sirte, and one rocket launcher and one tank in Brega.
13 May: 148 sorties were flown by NATO aircraft, of which 44 were strike sorties. Targets included a command facility in Brega, a strike which killed eleven people with 45 injured, a command facility, 20 storage buildings, four ammunition storage facilities and two SAM launchers in Tripoli, eight military vehicles near Misrata and Zintan, tanks near Brega and weapons storage facilities near al Qaryat.
15 May: NATO flew 147 sorties, including 48 strike sorties. Key targets hit include one command and control center in Zawiya, four SAM launchers in Tripoli, one self-propelled artillery piece near Misrata, two ammunition storage facilities in Hun, and two SAM launchers, one self-propelled artillery piece and one APC in Sirte.
18 May: 159 sorties were flown by NATO aircraft, of which 53 were strike sorties. Major targets included a training facility near Tripoli, command buildings near Zuwara, heavy weaponry near Misrata and an ammunition storage facility near Mizda.
19 May: Eight ships of the Libyan Navy were destroyed in the ports of Tripoli, Khoms and Sirte. Elsewhere, NATO aircraft flew 166 sorties, 60 of which were strike sorties. Targets included, in addition to the naval vessels, command facilities near Tripoli, Sirte and Zuwara, rocket launchers near Khoms and Mizda, two storage buildings near Mizda and Sabha and four military vehicles near Brega and Mizda.
20 May: 157 sorties were flown by NATO aircraft, including 58 strike sorties. Targets included command facilities near Tripoli and Sabha, one storage facilities near Tripoli and Sirte, rocket launchers near Tripoli and Zintan, and three SAM missile launchers near Sirte.
23 May: French Defense Minister Gerard Longuet announced that France and Britain planned to send attack helicopters to enter the conflict. According to a French newspaper, twelve Tiger and Gazelle helicopters were deployed on Tonnerre on 17 May. At the time, Britain did not confirm that it intended to send helicopters to Libya.
25 May: The Guardian reported that a formal announcement that Britain planned to send Apache helicopters would occur on 26 May. Government officials said that HMS Ocean, carrying four helicopters, was due to arrive at the Libyan coast in several days. NATO aircraft flew 136 sorties, including 42 strike sorties.
26 May: NATO aircraft flew 140 sorties, including 54 strike sorties, with targets including five storage facilities, one vehicle, one SAM launcher, heavy weaponry and aircraft.
27 May: According to a senior NATO official, French and British helicopters were planned to begin operations as soon as possible.
30 May: NATO aircraft flew 158 sorties, including 58 strike sorties.

== June ==
1 June: NATO announced that it had extended its military operations in Libya for 90 days; Secretary-General Anders Fogh Rasmussen said that NATO "will sustain our efforts to fulfill the United Nations mandate. We will keep up the pressure to see it through." NATO also said that aircraft strikes had hit a vehicle storage facility and an SAM launcher in Tripoli, one ammunition storage facility in Mizda and one ammunition storage facility and one fire control radar in Hun, as well as having boarded and denied passage to one ship as part of the arms embargo.
2 June: 172 sorties were flown, of which 63 engaged targets. One vehicle depot, two ammunition depots, four SAM launchers, six armoured personnel carriers (APCs), one tank, two armored fighting vehicles, one command and control node and one radar were hit.
3 June: Airstrikes hit two ammunition storage facilities, three command and control nodes and a military camp comprising fourteen vehicles, two shelters and twelve tents.
4 June: British and French helicopters engaged targets for the first time on the night of 4 June, targeting heavy weapons, a radar installation and a checkpoint with Hellfire missiles and 30mm cannons.
5 June: NATO strikes attacked three command and control centers, one SAM storage facility, one ground forces compound, one air defense compound, four SAM launchers, one radar, three military vehicles and an armored fighting vehicle.
6 June: 42 strike sorties were conducted, hitting one command and control center, one SAM storage facility, two command and control nodes, one vehicle storage facility and four SAM launchers in Tripoli and one mobile command and control node near Sirte.
7 June: Warplanes struck six command and control facilities, one vehicle storage facility, two self-propelled anti-aircraft guns, one air surveillance radar and two truck mounted guns.
8 June: 113 sorties were carried out, including 47 strike sorties. Targets hit included one vehicle storage facility, two SAM facilities, one command and control center, one tank, four armored fighting vehicles, one electronic warfare vehicle, one military training camp comprising five shelters, nine containers and one air asset.
9 June: NATO conducted 149 sorties and 43 strike sorties. Targets included one vehicle storage facility, two command and control facilities, one early warning radar, two SAM launchers, two anti-air guns and three tanks in Tripoli, two rocket launchers, one truck mounted gun, four tanks, one heavy equipment transport, two command and control nodes, two armored fighting vehicles and two checkpoints near Misrata and one command and control center in Brega.
10 June: NATO planes bombed a military camp, one vehicle and maintenance facility, fourteen tanks and one military vehicle close to Tripoli, one command and control facility, three radar facilities in Ra's Lanuf, three artillery units in Waddan and one tank, two rocket launchers, one technical and two armed vehicles near Misrata.
11 June: NATO aircraft conducted 116 sorties, including 51 strike sorties. Key hits included one vehicle depot, one ammunition depot, one command and control facility, one tank, two anti-aircraft emplacements and one self-propelled artillery piece in Tripoli, one ammunition depot in Waddan, one armored vehicle near Misrata and one tank in Zliten.
12 June: International forces conducted 136 sorties, of which 52 were strike sorties. Targets included three anti-air pieces, one SAM launcher and one grenade launcher in Tripoli, one ammunition storage facility in Waddan, two rocket launchers, two anti-air emplacements and a military truck near Misrata, one ammunition facility near Al-Qaryat and four truck mounted guns and one tank in Brega.
13 June: Airstrikes hit 11 SAM launchers and detection radar, one ammunition storage facility, one command and control center, one towed artillery piece, three truck mounted guns, two military trucks, one shelter, an armored vehicle depot and one anti-air emplacement.
14 June: On the same day Canada recognised the National Transitional Council as the government of Libya, Canada extended its military involvement by three months, to expire in September 2011. Canada had no plans to take further military action following their deadline. However, Charles Bouchard is to continue to assume command of the Canadian-led NATO mission past September. NATO aircraft hit one air defense compound and two SAM launchers in Tripoli, one ammunition storage facility in Waddan, three armored fighting vehicles and a truck-mounted gun near Misrata, one truck-mounted gun in Yafran and two armored fighting vehicles in Brega.
15 June: NATO flew 44 strike sorties, hitting a vehicle storage area and two command and control nodes in Tripoli, one anti-aircraft gun in Zuwara, one anti-aircraft guns, one tank, one technical and one lightweight weapon near Zintan, one ammunition storage facility near Waddan and two rocket launchers and an anti-aircraft gun near Misrata.
16 June: Warplanes bombed one vehicle storage and maintenance facility, one SAM launcher and loader vehicle, fourteen truck-mounted guns, three tanks, an ammunition storage facility and a fuel truck.
17 June: 139 sorties and 59 strike sorties were flown, hitting three vehicle depots, three SAM loaders and three self-propelled artillery pieces in and near Tripoli, one rocket launcher, three tanks and a military truck in the vicinity of Misrata and five truck mounted guns and two anti-air guns near Zintan.
18 June: NATO jets hit a column of vehicles belonging to Libyan rebels, killing four and wounded 16 in a town of east Ajdabiya in a friendly fire incident.
19 June: 137 sorties were flown, including 60 strike sorties. In Tripoli, one military vehicle storage facility and two SAM guidance radars were hit. Near Misrata, two rocket launchers, one truck-mounted gun, three tanks, two anti-aircraft artillery pieces and a military logistics truck was hit. In Sabha, one command and control node was struck.
20 June: NATO conducted 52 strike sorties, hitting one command and control node, eight SAM launchers, one SAM transport vehicle, three truck-mounted guns, two self-propelled anti-aircraft guns, one tank, one military equipment storage facility, one military vehicle storage facility and one rocket launcher.
21 June: 140 sorties were conducted, including 48 strike sorties. Targets included three SAM launchers and one self propelled anti-air gun in Tripoli, five truck-mounted guns, one APC and two anti-aircraft guns in Nalut, one truck mounted gun and one military camp comprising one tuck-mounted guns, six military trucks and twelve shelters in Zliten and one rocket launcher, two anti-aircraft guns and three SAM loader vehicles in Zintan were hit.
22 June: 128 sorties were flown by international forces, of which 44 were strike sorties. Among the targets were one radar and one command and control node in Tripoli, one ammunition storage facility in Jadu, thirteen armed vehicles, one APC and one rocket launcher in Zliten, one SAM loader near Zintan and one command and control facility comprising two radar towers near Misrata.
23 June: NATO flew 149 sorties, including 47 strike sorties. Targets included one tank, one radar, one military equipment storage facility, nine self propelled artillery pieces and one anti-aircraft transport loader truck in and around Tripoli, one artillery piece in the vicinity of Zliten and two rocket launchers, one anti-aircraft missile launcher and three self-propelled artillery pieces near Zintan.
24 June: 137 sorties were conducted, including 43 strike sorties. Targets included seven command and control facilities, one military storage facility, fourteen truck mounted guns, one tank, two APCs, three logistics trucks and seven military shelters in Brega, one early warning radar and one truck mounted gun near Gharyan, two artillery pieces, one mortar and one truck mounted gun in Zliten and three SAM loader vehicles near Okba.
25 June: International forces conducted 123 sorties, of which 45 were strike sorties. Key hits included two tanks, one logistics vehicle, three military shelters, four military compounds and one antennae in Brega, one armed vehicle near Zintan, one vehicle storage facility, four anti-aircraft guns, two SAM loader vehicles, two SAM transport vehicles, one radar van and one self-propelled anti-aircraft gun in and around Tripoli.
26 June: 138 sorties were conducted, including 56 strike sorties. Among the targets hit were three command and control facilities and one tank near Brega, three technicals in Ra's Lanuf, two artillery pieces in Zintan, one antennae near Zuwara, one logistics facility near Yafran and two towed artillery pieces in Tripoli.
27 June: 142 sorties were conducted, 46 of which were intended as strike sorties. NATO hit a command and control facility and a tank in Brega, one tank in the vicinity of Ra's Lanuf, six APCs and three tanks near Zintan, three fire control radars in Zuwara and one command and control facility and one command and control vehicle in and around Tripoli.
28 June: International aircraft flew 148 sorties, including 58 strike sorties. Targets included three command and control facilities, one armored vehicle, one artillery piece, thelve armed vehicles, five armed pick-up trucks, three trucks and three military hangars in Brega, one multiple rocket launcher, one mortar, one armed vehicle, one command and control center in Zliten, one anti-air missile launcher and two radars in Tripoli and one military compound in Gharyan.
29 June: 149 sorties and 55 strike sorties were flown. Key hits included twelve military vehicles, one military truck, one APC, one ammunition storage facility, one military compound and one military checkpoint in Brega, one multiple rocket launcher, five battle tanks, two pieces of artillery and three military vehicles near Misrata, one self-propelled anti-aircraft gun, one military technical vehicle, two multiple rocket launchers and one military equipment storage facility in Tripoli, four battle tanks, one military technical vehicle and one heavy equipment transport in Gharyan, one battle tank and one military technical vehicle in Sirte, one ammunition storage facility in Waddan and one military technical vehicle in Nalut.
30 June: International forces flew 140 sorties, of which 42 were strike sorties. Targets were two command and control centers in Brega, two technicals near Misrata, one military facility and a radar in Tripoli, one military facility near Gharyan, one military storage facility in Waddan and two multiple rocket launchers near Bir al-Ghanam.

== July ==
1 July: 136 sorties and 42 strike sorties were conducted, hitting one military facility, three radars, two anti-aircraft guns, one SAM launcher, four tanks and a command and control vehicle in Tripoli, two tanks in the vicinity of Gharyan, one military storage facility near Waddan, and two armed vehicles in Bir al-Ghanam.
2 July: 125 sorties were flown, of which 52 were strike sorties. NATO aircraft destroyed two radars and three military vehicles in Tripoli, one armed vehicle, two anti-aircraft guns, and one self-propelled artillery piece near Okba, one tank near Gharyan, three armored vehicles in Zliten, three armed vehicles near Misrata, one military storage facility and a truck in the vicinity of Waddan, and one military vehicle in Sirte. NATO vessels also boarded and denied a vessel as part of the arms embargo.
3 July: NATO aircraft flew 148 sorties, of which 71 were strike sorties. Targets that were hit included one armored fighting vehicle, one anti-aircraft gun and two command and control buildings in Tripoli, thirteen armed vehicles, two command and control nodes, two military storage facilities, one tank and one artillery piece in Brega, one military storage facility in Waddan, two armed vehicles and an anti-aircraft gun in Misrata, one armored fighting vehicle in Abu Qurayn, one tank in Sirte, one armed vehicle in Gharyan, and three armed vehicles in Zuwara.
4 July: 145 sorties and 59 strike sorties were flown, hitting one command and control center in Tripoli, one tank, one artillery piece and one military storage facility in Brega, one military facility in Waddan, one tank near Misrata, one military camp in Nalut, two armed vehicles and an armored fighting vehicle near Zintan, one armed vehicle in Zliten, and two armored fighting vehicles in Sirte.
5 July: NATO conducted 134 sorties, including 56 strike sorties. Key targets included one command and control center in Brega, two armed vehicles and four tanks near Gharyan, one tank, one command and control center and an artillery piece near Misrata, three armored fighting vehicles in Sirte, and one military storage facility in Waddan.
6 July: NATO aircraft conducted 140 sorties and 57 strike sorties, hitting military refueling equipment, eight armed vehicles, two armored fighting vehicles and one truck in Brega, one anti-aircraft gun in Gharyan, three armed vehicles near Misrata, one military storage facility near Waddan, one artillery piece and one armed vehicle in Yafran, eight armed vehicles in Zliten and an armed vehicle in Zintan.
7 July: NATO aircraft flew 134 sorties, of which 46 were strike sorties. Targets destroyed included military refueling equipment in Brega, three armed vehicles in Gharyan, one military facility in Waddan, one tank in Sirte, one artillery piece and one radar in Zliten, and three anti-aircraft guns and a command and control center in Tripoli.
8 July: 140 sorties were flown, of which 49 were strike sorties. Targets included one tank in Brega, one artillery piece and one multiple rocket launcher near Misrata, two military storage facilities, two SAM launchers, one radar and four command and control buildings in Tripoli, one military storage facility near Waddan, four armed vehicles in Yafran, one tank in Zliten and one command and control facility in Zintan. HMS Liverpool fired on three RHIBs near Zliten. Two returned to Zliten, the other beached and was destroyed by Liverpool's 4.5" gun.
9 July: NATO aircraft flew 112 sorties, of which 48 were strike sorties. Airstrikes hit one tank and one armed vehicle in Brega, one armored fighting vehicle, four armed vehicles, one missile, four artillery pieces and one multiple rocket launcher near Misrata, one military storage facility and five SAM launchers in Tripoli, one military storage facility and one multiple rocket launcher in Waddan, one multiple rocket launcher and a tank in Yafran and Gharyan, one artillery piece in Ra's Lanuf and one artillery piece in Zintan.
10 July: NATO conducted 139 sorties and 54 strike sorties. Key hits included three armed vehicles in Brega, eight artillery pieces, one tank, eight military vehicles, one military compound and three multiple rocket launchers in Misrata, three radars and three SAM launchers in Tripoli, three multiple rocket launchers in Zliten, one radar and one military storage facility in Okba and one military storage facility in 'Aziziya.
11 July: NATO aircraft conducted 132 sorties and 49 strike sorties. Key targets were two armed vehicles near Misrata, three radars, three SAM launchers and an anti-aircraft gun in Tripoli, one military storage facility near Waddan and three military facilities, seven military vehicles and one armed vehicle in Zuwara.
12 July: NATO aircraft flew 127 sorties, 35 of which were strike sorties, with targets including two missile launchers, two vehicles, a radar installation, five SAM launchers and a storage facility; most strikes were near Misrata and an unidentified location.
13 July: UK defense minister Liam Fox said that the British military had been stretched by the continued conflict, and that he believed other European members of NATO should expand their participation in military operations. NATO aircraft flew 130 sorties, 50 of which were strike sorties, targeting four command centers, seven SAM launchers, artillery, one tank and six armed vehicles, with most targets near Brega, Misrata and Tripoli.
14 July: An official at the UK defense ministry said that UK forces were finding it difficult to obtain further targets to attack, due to government troops using civilian vehicles and infrastructure. NATO aircraft flew 132 sorties, of which 48 were strike sorties that targeted four rocket launchers, three tanks, three vehicles and other heavy weapons, as well as five military buildings; most targets were near Brega, Gharyan and Tripoli.
15 July: NATO aircraft flew 115 sorties, 46 of which were strike sorties targeting seventeen vehicles, one SAM launcher and rocket launcher and three buildings near Brega.
16 July: NATO aircraft flew 110 sorties, 45 of which were strike sorties with targets including six vehicles, six rocket and missile launchers, seven anti-aircraft guns, three radar installations and two storage facilities; most strikes were near Breaga, Misrata and Tripoli.
17 July: NATO aircraft flew 122 sorties, 46 of which were strike sorties, targeting eleven vehicles, three military buildings and a roadblock, with most strikes occurring near Brega.
18 July: NATO aircraft flew 129 sorties, 44 of which were strike sorties, with targets consisting largely of seven artillery pieces, a SAM launcher, two storage facilities, a command building and ten vehicles; strikes took place mostly near Brega, Misrata and Tripoli.
19 July: NATO aircraft flew 113 sorties, 40 of which were strike sorties; targets included ten vehicles, seven SAM launchers, two storage facilities and seven military facilities, with most targets near Zliten, Tripoli and Brega.
20 July: NATO aircraft flew 122 sorties, 53 of which were strike sorties, targeting five vehicles, two SAM launchers, three heavy weapons and 14 buildings, including five storage, two command and operations facilities, with most targets near Zliten and Misrata.
21 July: NATO aircraft flew 124 sorties, 45 of which were strike sorties, targeting six storage facilities, one multiple rocket launcher, one building, eight anti-aircraft defenses and five military vehicles, largely near Tripoli and Zliten. The Los Angeles Times reported that the US government was considering moving additional UAVs and other surveillance aircraft to the Libyan conflict, after NATO commanders said that finding targets to attack was becoming difficult.
22 July: NATO aircraft flew 128 sorties, including 46 strike sorties. Aircraft destroyed one military storage facility in Khoms, one military storage facility and four armed vehicles in Brega, one command and control facility in Tripoli, one military facility in Waddan, three anti-aircraft guns near Zintan, and one military storage facility, two tanks, two anti-aircraft guns and one armed vehicle in Zliten.
23 July: NATO aircraft conducted 125 sorties, 56 of which were strike sorties, targeting storage facilities, anti-aircraft defenses, heavy weaponry and command centers, with most of the strikes taking place near Brega, Tripoli and Zliten.
24 July: 163 sorties were flown, of which 43 were strike sorties. Key hits included one military storage facility in Brega, one SAM launcher, one military storage facility and one tank in Tripoli, one tank near Zintan, two ammunition storage facilities and one command and control facility in Zliten and one tank and one multiple rocket launcher in Gharyan.
25 July: NATO aircraft flew 111 sorties and 54 strike sorties, hitting one military facility, five armored vehicles, two tanks and eleven light military vehicles in Brega, two command and control nodes, two anti-aircraft weapons, three multiple rocket launchers and one military vehicle near Tripoli, one ammunition storage facility near Waddan, three command and control facilities, one armored vehicle storage facility and two armed vehicles in Zliten and two armored fighting vehicles near Gharyan.
26 July: NATO aircraft flew 134 sorties, of which 46 were strike sorties. Strikes destroyed five military vehicles, one tank and one military facility in Brega, one military facility and four anti-aircraft systems in Tripoli, one ammunition storage facility near Waddan, one military ammunition supply facility, two military facilities and four military supply vehicles in Zliten and four military supply vehicles near Misrata.
27 July: NATO aircraft flew 133 sorties, of which 54 were strike sorties. Targets included three armed vehicles, two military facilities and one multiple rocket launcher in Brega, three SAM launchers and three fire control radars in Tripoli, one ammunition storage facility near Waddan, one military facility, one ammunition storage facility and two military supply vehicles in Zliten, one self-propelled artillery piece and one anti-aircraft gun near Zintan and one multiple rocket launcher in Nalut.
28 July: NATO aircraft hit two armed military vehicles near Brega, two fire control radars, four military vehicles, one military facility and one command and control node in Tripoli, one ammunition storage facility in Waddan and four military facilities, one command and control node and one ammunition storage facility in Zliten.
29 July: NATO aircraft flew 124 sorties, hitting two armed military vehicles, one mortar, one multiple rocket launcher, two military logistics vehicles and seven military facilities in Brega, three fire control radars, one command and control node and three state TV satellite dishes in Tripoli, one ammunition storage facility near Waddan, three military facilities, one command and control node, one armored fighting vehicle, five armed vehicles, one fire control radar and an ammunition storage facility in Zliten, one command and control center near Bir al-Ghanam, one military facility in Bani Walid and one anti-aircraft gun in Yafran.
30 July 2011: Aircraft from the Norwegian Air Force flew their final missions over Libya, with all troops, equipment and aircraft to have left their base on Crete within two weeks. Targets hit included eight military vehicles, one tank and two military facilities in Brega, two anti-aircraft systems in Tripoli, one ammunition storage facility near Waddan and one command and control node, two tanks, one military vehicle, one anti-aircraft system and one military facility in Zliten.
31 July: NATO conducted 126 sorties, of which 49 were intended to strike targets. Key hits included one armed military vehicle and six multiple rocket launchers in Brega, one military facility in Tripoli, one ammunition storage facility near Waddan, three military facilities, two command and control nodes, two ammunition storage facilities, one tank, one anti-aircraft system, one multiple rocket launcher and one armed military vehicle in Zliten, two command and control nodes, one military facility and one ammunition storage facility near Bir al-Ghanam and two military vehicles near Misrata.

== August ==
1 August: NATO conducted 114 sorties, including 48 strike sorties. Two military facilities and two anti-aircraft systems were hit in Bir al-Ghanam, an ammunition facility in Gharyan, one military facility, two SAM systems, one storage facility and a radar in Tripoli, one Ammunition storage facility near Waddan, one command and control node and one military facility near Zliten were targeted.
2 August: Out of 123 NATO sorties, 58 were strike sorties, hitting six military facilities, four command and control nodes, two tanks, three armed vehicles, one radar, two SAM systems, an anti-aircraft system, one logistic vehicle, one rocket launcher, and one ammo storage facility.
3 August: NATO flew 125 sorties, of which 53 were strike sorties. Targets included two armed vehicles, six military facilities, a multiple rocket launcher, one mortar, two anti-air systems, one SAM launchers, two radars, four command and control nodes and an ammo facility.
4 August: NATO airstrikes hit an ammunitions depot and a military police facility, killing 33 troops. According to rebel spokesperson, there were unconfirmed reports that the strikes had killed Khamis Gaddafi, the youngest son of Muammar Gaddafi, though a Libyan government official said that Khamis was still alive. In addition, NATO destroyed one military facility near Bir al-Ghanam, two military facilities in Tripoli, one tank, one multiple rocket launcher system and one military facility in Gharyan, two multiple rocket launchers and a SAM system in Zliten, two artillery pieces near Taworgha, and five military vehicles near Zuwara.
5 August: NATO aircraft hit a caravan of camels transporting weapons from Chad to a pro-government stronghold. NATO also destroyed one armed vehicle near Al Jawf, two military facilities, two tanks, 19 armed vehicles, one multiple rocket launcher, two military supply vehicles, five military trucks, six military buildings and one armored fighting vehicle in Brega, one military firing position and one command and control node in Gharyan, one multiple rocket launcher system staging area and one military checkpoint near Taworgha, seven armed vehicles near Teji, two artillery pieces near Misrata, and one military radar site and one military storage facility in Zliten.
6 August: NATO flew 115 sorties, of which 45 were strike sorties. Three rocket launchers, three command and control nodes, two military facilities, a rocket launcher storage, one tank, one surface to air system, six military supply vehicles, one military vehicle and an ammo depot were among the hit targets.
7 August: 119 sorties were conducted, including 59 strike sorties. Among the targets hit were a facility, a rocket launcher and two tanks in Brega, one anti-air gun, a surface-to air system, and a surface-to-air launcher in Tripoli, an ammunition depot near Waddan, four command and control facilities, a weapons storage facility, a rocket launcher, a military facility and an anti-tank gun in Zliten, one artillery piece in Gharyan, and a military facility near Misrata.
8–9 August: Overnight RAF jets successfully bombed a Libyan frigate in Tripoli harbour, a vehicle and ammunitions depot, a communications center, military barracks, and a staging post.
10 August: The Italian Air Force flew its first mission using a Predator drone, conducting surveillance operations. NATO also said they hit one ammunition storage facility near Waddan, two armed vehicles near Brega, one armed vehicle and one anti-aircraft system in Gharyan, three armed vehicles and one SAM site, one military facility, one bunker, one command and control node and one radar site in Sabha, three command and control nodes and two military storage facilities in Taworgha, one military facility and one command and control node in Zliten and one multiple rocket launcher in Bir al-Ghanam.
11 August: 123 sorties were flown by NATO, including 42 strike sorties. Key hits include an ammunition storehouse near Waddan, an armed vehicle, a rocket launcher and an artillery piece in Brega, two armed vehicles in Bir al-Ghanam, five SAM vehicles in the capital of Tripoli, a radar near Sirte and a command and control facility in Zliten.
12 August: Out of 118 sorties, NATO flew 48 strike sorties. Among the targets were three ammunition storage facilities, seven armed vehicles, a military facility, a vehicle depot, an SAM launcher, an SAM facility, two armored vehicles and two anti-air emplacements.
13 August: 110 sorties and 47 strike sorties were flown, with targets including thirteen military vehicles, five anti aircraft guns, a rocket launcher, an ammunition storage facility and two tanks.
14 August: NATO hit an anti-aircraft gun in Zawiya, a military facility near Gharyan, eleven SAM transloader vehicles, one SAM radar trailer and three radars in Tripoli, and four military facilities, one command and control facility, one armed vehicle and one artillery piece in Zliten.
15 August: NATO conducted 127 sorties, of which 49 were strike sorties. Key strikes include three tanks and two military vehicles in Zawiya, a military storage facility in Khoms, four rocket launchers in Brega, an ammunition storage facility near Waddan, one rocket launcher near Misrata, one facility and two rocket launchers in Zliten, and two tanks, one SAM vehicle, one SAM launchers and a radar near Tripoli.
16 August: NATO flew 100 sorties, including 50 strike sorties; key hits included two storage facilities, one anti-air gun, five military vehicles, two SAM trailers, one SAM launcher, and one command and control facility. NATO also claims they hit 150 targets in Libya over the past week.
17 August: A boat carrying Gaddafi forces and two armed vehicles in Zawiya, three rocket launchers and two tanks in Brega, four armed vehicles in Badr, two tanks in Zliten, two ammunition depots near Waddan, and one military facility, one radar, two surface to air transloaders, three SAM launchers and two surface to surface launchers in Tripoli were destroyed.
18 August: 133 sorties were flown, 48 of which were strike sorties. In Zawiya, one command and control facility, five tanks, two armed vehicles and a transloader were hit. In Tripoli, warplanes bombed one SAM launcher and four military facilities.
19 August: NATO conducted 130 sorties, 26 of which were strike sorties. Key hits included a military vehicle and a tank in Zawiya, nine military facilities, three radars, one radar guided anti-aircraft system and one tank in Tripoli, and one military logistics vehicle and one tank near Zliten.
20 August: In Tripoli, NATO airstrikes hit three military facilities, one military storage facility, seven SAM transloaders, one radar, one SAM launcher, two armed vehicles, two armored fighting vehicles, three command and control node, and two multiple rocket launchers. NATO also hit a command and control facility near Sirte, one multiple rocket launcher, one heavy machine gun, and a military firing position in Brega, one armed vehicle and an anti-air emplacement near Gharyan and an SAM launcher near Zliten. NATO ships also boarded and stopped a vessel headed for Libya as part of the arms embargo.
21 August: NATO warplanes conducted 126 sorties, of which 46 were strike sorties. Three command and control centers, one military facility, three radars, 14 SAM launchers, one tank and two armed vehicles were hit, with the majority of the strikes in Tripoli.
22 August: Two Multiple Rocket Launchers near Brega were destroyed by NATO. NATO also said they conducted 36 strike sorties.
23 August: NATO struck two armored fighting vehicles, two military heavy equipment trucks, three SAM systems and one radar in Tripoli, three armed vehicles and three multiple rocket launchers in near Ra's Lanuf, and two tanks, three armed vehicles, two military trucks and one military facility in Zuwara.
24 August: NATO conducted 141 sorties, including 38 strike sorties. Key hits include two military storage facilities, one military heavy equipment truck, two anti-aircraft guns, one SAM support vehicle, one multiple rocket launcher and one radar in Tripoli, one SAM support vehicle in Sirte, one SAM launcher in Okba, and one anti-tank rifle in Bani Walid. NATO also boarded and denied a ship as part of the arms embargo, bringing the total to 11 denials. France began operating EADS Harfang drones in the conflict, operated from Naval Air Station Sigonella in Sicily.
25 August: NATO airstrikes destroyed one command and control node, one SAM trans/loader vehicle and one SAM launcher in Tripoli, 29 armed vehicles and one command and control node in Sirte.
26 August: NATO conducted 123 sorties, including 42 strike sorties. Key hits include two military facilities, one military storage facility, and one SAM launcher near Tripoli, one armored fighting vehicle, 11 armed vehicles, three logistic military vehicles, one military observation point, two shelters, and one military engineer asset near Sirte, two multiple rocket launchers near Ra's Lanuf, one tank near El Assa, one SAM transporter and one radar near Okba, and one SAM launcher and two radars near 'Aziziya.
27 August: NATO hit a SAM launcher in Tripoli, one surface to surface supply vehicle in Sirte, one military storage facility in Bani Walid and one SAM facility in 'Aziziya.
28 August: NATO Aircraft destroyed two armed vehicles, one multiple rocket launcher and one anti-aircraft gun near Waddan, four radars, 20 SAM canisters, three military support vehicles, one antennae and two SAM systems in Sirte, and five multiple rocket launchers, one artillery piece and one armed vehicle near Ra's Lanuf.
29 August: NATO flew 120 sorties, of which 42 were intended as strike sorties. Key hits include three command and control nodes, four radars, one SAM system, 22 armed vehicles, one command post, two military supply vehicles, one anti-aircraft missile system and one military facility near Sirte, two command and control nodes and one military ammo storage facility near Bani Walid, five anti-aircraft artillery, one multiple rocket launcher, one radar and one anti-aircraft gun near Hun. One of Muammar Gaddafi's sons, Khamis, was reported killed when a British Apache helicopter struck his vehicle. The NTC confirmed Khamis was dead and that he was buried in Bani Walid.
30 August: International forces conducted 109 sorties, including 38 strike sorties. Targets included one command and control center, three tanks, 12 armed vehicles, one military facility, one command post and one radar in Sirte, one military ammo storage facility, one military tank/multiple rocket launcher storage facility, one military facility and three SAM launchers near Bani Walid, and four anti-aircraft weapon systems, one anti-aircraft artillery piece, one radar, two tanks, two multiple rocket launchers and one artillery piece near Hun.
31 August: NATO flew 110 sorties, including 34 strike sorties. Key hits include one command and control node, five SAM transloaders, one armed vehicle, one tank, four SAM launchers and one multiple rocket launcher in Sirte, one ammo storage facility and one command and control node in Bani Walid, and one radar and one military support vehicle in Hun.

== September ==
1 September: NATO aircraft flew 110 sorties, of which 38 were strike sorties. Key hits included one command and control node and ammunition storage facility, seven SAM transloaders, two armed vehicles, one tank, two military trucks and three SAM canisters in Sirte, one ammunition storage facility and one armed vehicle in Bani Walid and two anti-aircraft guns, two anti-aircraft artillery systems and two radars near Waddan.
2 September: NATO conducted 122 sorties, including 40 strike sorties. Targets hit included one ammunition storage facility, eleven SAM canisters, four tanks and a training area in Sirte, one military vehicle storage facility in Bani Walid and one command and control node and one military vehicle in Hun.
3 September: NATO conducted 107 sorties, of which 48 were strike sorties. Targets hit included military barracks, an ammunition storage facility, one military police camp, one command and control node, seven SAM canisters, one SAM system and one self propelled artillery piece in Sirte, one ammunition storage facility in Bani Walid, one command and control node and four anti-aircraft guns near Hun and one command and control node, six armed vehicles, two military barracks, three military supply vehicles, two engineer support vehicles and one multiple rocket launcher near Buwayrat.
4 September: NATO conducted 117 sorties, 52 of which were intended to strike targets. Key hits included one military vehicle storage facility, two armed vehicles, four multiple rocket launchers, two heavy machine guns and four SAM canisters in Sirte, one command and control node/warehouse in Sabha, fourteen SAM canisters near Waddan and three anti-aircraft systems and three radars in Hun.
5 September: NATO conducted 116 sorties, including 42 strike sorties. Key hits included one military radar/communications site, one command and control bunker, four armed vehicles, four SAM systems and two general military facilities in Sirte and three radars and four anti-aircraft guns in Hun.
6 September: NATO conducted 118 sorties, of which 40 were strike sorties. Key hits included one SAM canister, one multiple rocket launcher, four armed vehicles, one ammunition storage facility, six tanks, six armored fighting vehicles and one self-propelled artillery in Sirte, three radars and three anti-aircraft guns in Hun, one SAM facility in Sabha and eight anti-aircraft guns in Waddan.
7 September: NATO destroyed five armored fighting vehicles and two armed vehicles in Sirte and eighteen SAM systems in Waddan.
8 September: NATO conducted 113 sorties, of which 36 were strike sorties. Targets hit included two armed vehicles and one multiple rocket launcher in Sirte, nine anti-aircraft guns and three radar systems near Waddan, one military vehicle storage facility in Sabha and one SAS storage facility in Bani Walid.
9 September: 110 sorties were conducted, including 40 strike sorties. Targets included one SAM facility, one multiple rocket launcher and an armed vehicle in Sirte, one command and control facility near Hun, one military facility near Jufra, one tank in Sabha and one armed vehicle in Bani Walid.
10 September: NATO conducted 112 sorties, of which 50 were strike sorties. Key hits included one set of SAM canisters, two tanks and two armed vehicles in Sirte, three anti-aircraft guns and five SAM canisters in Waddan, one staging area near Sabha and one tank, two armed vehicles and one multiple rocket launcher in Bani Walid.
11 September: NATO conducted 114 sorties, of which 44 were strike sorties. Key hits included one military logistic facility, one command and control facility, one radar system, seven SAM systems and seven armed vehicles near Sirte, four anti-aircraft guns near Waddan and one command and control facility near Sabha.
12 September: NATO aircraft flew 114 sorties, including 37 strike sorties. Key hits included one radar system, eight SAM systems, five SAM transloaders, one armed vehicle and two air defense command vehicles in Sirte, one anti-aircraft gun near Waddan and six tanks and two armored fighting vehicles in Sabha.
13 September: NATO flew 122 sorties, including 44 strike sorties. Targets included one command and control node, one multiple rocket launcher, two anti-aircraft guns, one armed vehicle and four radar systems in Sirte, seven anti-aircraft guns near Waddan, and one armed vehicle near Zella.
14 September: NATO aircraft flew 123 sorties, including 49 strike sorties. Key hits included one command and control node, one military vehicle storage facility, four radar systems and two SAM systems in Sirte, two anti-aircraft guns, one radar system, two military logistic vehicles and three SAM systems near Waddan, one multiple rocket launcher and two armed vehicles in Zella, two armed vehicles in Bani Walid, and one military storage depot and two military staging areas near Sabha.
15 September: NATO conducted 116 sorties, including 40 strike sorties. Key targets included one military storage facility, one tank, two armed vehicles, four multiple rocket launchers and eight air missile systems in Sirte, one multiple rocket launcher near Waddan, and four armored vehicles, one multiple rocket launcher, one tank and five armed vehicles near Sabha.
16 September: NATO aircraft flew 121 sorties, including 43 strike sorties. Targets included five command and control nodes, three radars, four armed vehicles and eight air missile systems in Sirte, and four anti-aircraft guns near Hun.
17 September: NATO conducted 106 sorties, of which 42 were intended to strike targets. Key hits included two command and control nodes, four multiple rocket launchers, one armed vehicle and four SAM systems in Sirte, nine anti-aircraft guns near Hun, one command and control node and one vehicle storage facility in Jufra, and one armored fighting vehicle, one armed vehicle and one multiple rocket launcher near Sabha.
18 September: NATO conducted 223 sorties, including 43 strike sorties. Key hits included one military facility, one command and control node, one multiple rocket launcher and four air missile systems in Sirte, and one tank, four multiple rocket launchers, two armed vehicles and six anti-aircraft guns in Waddan.
19 September: NATO conducted 91 sorties, including 32 strike sorties. Targets included one armed vehicle and one multiple rocket system in Sirte, six anti-aircraft guns and one command and control node near Waddan/Hun, two air missile systems, two air defense radar facilities and three air missile storage facilities near Sabha, and one command and control node in Bani Walid.
20 September: NATO conducted 102 sorties, including 32 strike sorties. Key hits included two ammunition storage facilities, one command and control node, one military vehicle storage facility, six air missile systems and one tank in Sirte, and one military vehicle storage facility, four anti-aircraft guns and one armed vehicle near Waddan/Hun.
21 September: NATO destroyed one command and control node and five SAM launchers in Sirte, and four anti aircraft guns and one vehicle storage depot in Hun. NATO announced an agreement to continue military action over Libya for an additional three months. The United Kingdom announced that it planned to withdraw four Eurofighter Typhoons jets and three Apache AH1 helicopters from Libyan operations, leaving sixteen Tornado GR4 jets and two Apaches for Libyan operations.
22 September 2011: NATO hit one ammunition storage depot and military barracks facility in Sirte.
23 September: NATO hit one ammunition storage facility, one anti-aircraft gun, one command and control node and two armed vehicles in Sirte.
24 September: NATO conducted 152 sorties, including 34 strike sorties, hitting two command and control nodes, one military staging position, one division storage bunker and radar facility, three ammunition storage facilities, one weapons firing position, one ammunition and vehicle depot, one vehicle staging point and 29 armed vehicles in Sirte.
25 September: NATO destroyed one command and control node, two ammunition/vehicle storage facilities, one radar facility, one multiple rocket launcher, one military support vehicle, one artillery piece and one ammunition storage facility in Sirte.
26 September: NATO destroyed one command and control node and one ammunition/vehicle storage facility in Sirte, and two bunkers/command and control nodes and one firing point in Bani Walid.
27 September: NATO destroyed one ammunition/vehicle storage facility in Sirte.
28 September: NATO conducted 96 sorties, including 30 strike sorties. Key hits include one ammunition/vehicle storage facility, one staging and firing location, one command and control staging area, two ammunition storage facilities and one tank in Sirte.
29 September: NATO flew 100 sorties, of which 42 were strike sorties. Key hits include one ammunition storage area and one multiple rocket launcher area near Sirte, and one ammunition storage area and one multiple rocket launcher in Bani Walid.
30 September: NATO destroyed 14 armed vehicles in Bani Walid.

== October ==
1 October: NATO flew 101 sorties, including 38 strike sorties. Key hits included one multiple rocket launcher firing point and one ammunition storage facility in Bani Walid, and one command and control node, one infantry and anti-aircraft artillery staging area, two armed vehicles, four armored infantry vehicles and one tank in Sirte.
2 October: NATO destroyed one multiple rocket launcher and one armed vehicle in Sirte.
4 October: NATO destroyed one command and control node in Bani Walid.
5 October: NATO hit one military installation, six command and control nodes and one military staging location in Bani Walid.
6 October: One tank was destroyed in Bani Walid.
7 October: One firing and vehicle staging point was destroyed in Sirte.
9 October: Three armed vehicles were struck in Bani Walid.
10 October: Two ammunition and vehicle storage facilities and one missile storage facility were hit in Bani Walid.
11 October: Six military vehicles were hit in Bani Walid.
12 October: Two military vehicles in Sirte and one military vehicle in Bani Walid were hit.
13 October: Four military vehicles and one multiple rocket launcher were hit in Bani Walid.
17 October: One command and control node and nine military vehicles were hit in Bani Walid.
20 October: NATO said they had attacked a convoy of about 75 vehicles leaving Sirte, destroying one vehicle. A group of 20 vehicles carrying Muammar Gaddafi broke off from the convoy and another air asset hit ten additional vehicles. NATO also claimed they had no knowledge of Gaddafi's presence at the time of the strike. Muammar Gaddafi died after being captured by rebel forces in the area.
