= Battle of Gharyan =

Battle of Gharyan may refer to:

- Battle of Gharyan (2011)
- Battle of Gharyan (2019)
