= Battle of Kikla (2014) =

- Part of Libyan civil war (2014-2020)
Date	24 November 2014
Location	Kikla, Libya
Result	Zintan Brigade victory

Belligerents
Fajr Libya	(Libya) Zintan Brigades

Commanders and leaders
Unknown	(Libya) Idris Madi

Strength
Unknown	Unknown

Casualties and losses
142	Unknown

The Battle of Kikla was a confrontation between Zintan Brigades and Fajr Libya in Kikla, Libya between 11 October and 24 November 2014.

== Battle ==
On October 11, 2014, the Zintan brigades attacked the Fajr Libya forces in Kikla. In the first two days, the fighting resulted in at least twenty deaths and dozens of injuries, according to medical sources.

On November 4, a doctor from Kikla stated on a local radio that the toll was 142 dead and 518 injured among the Fajr Libya forces. On November 24, the city of Kikla was completely conquered by the Zintan brigades.
