= Battle of Wazzin =

Conflict during the Libyan civil war

Coordinates: 31°56′32″N 10°39′45″E

- Part of the 2011 Nafusa Mountains Campaign
Date	21 April 2011 (first phase); 24–28 April 2011 (second phase); 29 April – May 2011 (third phase); 11–29 July 2011 (fourth phase)
Location	Wazzin, Libya and Dehiba, Tunisia
Result	Anti-Gaddafi victory: Loyalist forces occasionally shelled the crossing for months afterward.; Fighting ongoing after the Libyan Army clashes with the Tunisian Army
Territorial changes	Rebel forces capture Wazzin on 21 April.; Loyalist forces retake the border crossing on 28 April.; Rebels retake Wazzin on 4 May

Belligerents
(Libya) Anti-Gaddafi forces: National Liberation Army; Tunisia: Tunisian Army; Tunisian Police	Libyan Arab Jamahiriya

Commanders and leaders
(Libya) Mustafa Abdul Jalil (Tunisia) Fouad Mebazaa	(Libya) Col. Shu'ayb al-Firjani

Casualties and losses
Unknown (1st phase); 3 killed (2nd phase)*; 11 killed (3rd phase); Tunisia: 1 civilian wounded Several houses destroyed or damaged	15 killed 14 captured (1st phase) 23 killed (3rd phase)
- *Unconfirmed report that up to 20 people in total had been killed on 28 April

The Battle of Wazzin refers to a series of engagements during the First Libyan Civil War fought between Anti-Gaddafi forces and the Libyan Arab Jamahiriya for control of the town of Wazzin near the western Libya-Tunisia border.

The battle entered into Tunisian territory on several occasions, prompting clashes between the Tunisian Armed Forces and Gaddafi Loyalists.

== Background ==
In the early days of the war, towns in the Nafusa Mountains quickly joined the uprising against Muammar Gaddafi,but soon came under attack by loyalist forces. Rebels seized Wazzin but loyalists regained control, cutting off the supply line to the rebel-held mountain towns. To relieve the military and humanitarian pressure on their besieged towns, the rebels fought to retake the crossing.

== Battle ==
On 21 April, rebel forces assaulted Wazzin, but loyalist soldiers resisted them. Their advances were initially slow, but eventually overwhelmed Gaddafi's men, taking the town of Wazzin before swiftly capturing the crossing itself, causing Gaddafi's men to be trapped between the Tunisian border and the advancing rebels. In the end, 105 loyalist soldiers retreated into Tunisia, where they surrendered to Tunisian officials.

All of Gaddafi's men returned to Libya without charge; however, 13 men captured by the rebels remained in their hands.

With the border post in rebel hands, they began bringing supplies from Tunisia into the besieged towns of the Nafusa Mountains.

On 24 April, loyalist forces began shelling the border post in an attempt to recapture it, though no casualties were reported.

On 28 April, loyalist forces re-captured the Wazzin border crossing with Tunisia after a swift advance in which they pushed the rebels back over the border into Tunisia where the fighting continued on the edge of the Tunisian border town of Dehiba. State TV stated that several rebels were killed and others captured in the attack on the border post. Later during the day, the rebels attempted a counter-attack. Initially, they claimed to have re-taken the post. However, Reuters denied it later by confirming that the loyalists were still in full control. During the confusion, when it was thought that the rebels had won, scores of civilian vehicles attempted to re-enter Libya from Tunisia. But, they quickly turned back when they found Gaddafi's forces were still at the border crossing. Heavy fighting continued into the night, with rebels apparently massing for a renewed attack against the better-armed loyalists and during the evening the rebels once again claimed to have re-taken the crossing after they received reinforcements from Zintan. Still, this claim was also later found to be untrue.

The next morning, loyalist troops advanced from the crossing post of Wazzin in pursuit of the rebels, who had retreated onto Tunisian soil after a night of fighting, over the border and engaged them in the center of the town of Dehiba. Soon after that, clashes between Gaddafi and Tunisian troops were reported. The Tunisian military soon seized loyalist troops and led them back over the border. At the same time, the rebels again claimed to have re-taken the border post. However, Al Jazeera confirmed that the green flag of Gaddafi's Libya was still flying over the border post, thus proving that government troops were still in control. Control of the post shifted back and forth in the following days.

=== Libyan Army enters Tunisia ===
By 29 April, the situation on the border with Tunisia had begun to deteriorate rapidly. Rebel forces were frequently using the border region as a way to evade capture by Gaddafi forces, as well as a principal resupply route. In response, the loyalist forces launched an artillery barrage on the Tunisian town of Dehiba and advanced across the border. Elements of the Tunisian Army and border police, who had only recently returned to their posts following the border violation on 28 April, responded with deadly force to the incursion. By mid-afternoon, press reports had come in stating that the Tunisian military was engaged in combat with the Libyan Army in central Dehiba. Later in the day, fights between pro-Gaddafi forces and the Tunisian army had ceased. The Tunisian military had captured and disarmed pro-Gaddafi soldiers and then sent them back to Libya.

On 7 May, renewed fighting in Wazzin led to more shells falling in Tunisian territory, sparking mass evacuations in the border town of Dehiba. Roughly 100 shells fell within Tunisian territory causing one house to be damaged, although none were killed. The Tunisian authorities stated that the situation was 'very dangerous' and that they would do everything they had to in order to protect their civilians.

Nine days later, on 16 May, Tunisian troops stopped 200 loyalist soldiers from crossing into Tunisia and attempting to outflank the rebels. The soldiers cooperated and there was no confrontation.

On 9 July, there were sketchy reports that Gaddafi's men were still attacking Wazzin and of a large loyalist army amassing nearby, possibly with the intention of retaking the crossing.

On 29 July, rebels attacked loyalists in nearby Ayn Ghazaya. Heavy fighting ensued, and rebels shut down the crossing until it was more secure.
