= Dehiba =

- Commune and town
- Interactive map of Dehiba
- Location within Tunisia
- Coordinates: 32°01′N 10°42′E
- Country: Tunisia
- Governorate: Tataouine Governorate

Population (2014)
  - Total: 4,295
- Time zone: UTC+1 (CET)

Dehiba (Arabic: الذهيبة Dehiba) is a town and commune in the east of Tataouine Governorate, Tunisia. It lies some four kilometers west of the border of Libya, itself about the same distance east from the Libyan town of Wazzin.

During the 2011 Libyan civil war, the border crossing became crucial as a vital transport link for supplies to beleaguered civilians and rebel military forces in the Nafusa Mountains front.

Tented camps were set up near Dehiba to accommodate refugees from the Libyan conflict, mainly consisting of the inhabitants of the heavily disputed mountain towns nearby. The Libyan and Tunisian populations involved are mainly Imazighen (or Berbers), who share a common culture and language as well as family relationships.

Skirmishes took place between anti-Gaddafi rebels and Libyan government forces for control of the border crossing which spilled over into the town of Dehiba and its surrounding area. Tunisian troops also were reportedly involved in the exchanges of fire. On 17 May, and again on 14 June, Libyan government forces fired Grad rockets across the border in the vicinity of Dehiba, without causing damage.

== See also ==
- List of cities in Tunisia
- Battle of Wazzin

== Climate ==
The highest recorded temperature in Dehiba was 54.8 °C (130.6 °F) in July 1927.
