= 'Ayn al Ghazaya =

ʿAyn al Ghazāyā الغزايا Ghezaia
- Village
- Location in Libya
- Coordinates: 31°54′14″N 10°48′38″E
- Country: Libya
- Region: Tripolitania
- District: Nalut
- Elevation: 1,942 ft (592 m)
- Time zone: UTC+2 (EET)

ʿAyn al Ghazaya (Arabic: الغزايا) is a village in Nalut District in northwestern Libya. It lies on a crossroads on the Wazzin–Nalut road on the northern edge of the Tripolitanian Plateau in the Nafusa Mountains.

== History ==
ʿAyn al Ghazaya was a Gaddafi stronghold during the 2011 Libyan civil war, and provided a base for loyalist troops in the 2011 Nafusa Mountains Campaign. After the some 5,000 inhabitants were removed to Tripoli, it was captured by the rebel forces on 29 July 2011.
