= Qotros =

Village in Libya

Qotros is a village located in Libya, in the Nafusa Mountains, near Rahibat (Omsin).

Amazigh village consists of a mixture of Nafusi and Arabs, divided into tribes.

== Population ==
There are 4000 inhabitants in the village (70% Arabs, 30% Amazigh).

== History ==
In the past, the village was one of the largest cities in the region, and was characterized by a geographical location where caravans regularly passed through. One of the leading Islamic scholars in this village was Abu Amrous bin Fatah Msakni.
