= Al-Qawalish =

Al-Qawalish القواليش El Guwaleesh
- Village
- Location in Libya
- Coordinates: 31°59′59″N 12°37′48″E
- Country: Libya
- Region: Tripolitania
- District: Jabal al Gharbi
- Time zone: UTC+2 (EET)

Al-Qawalish (Arabic: القواليش. also spelled Gwalish or Qwalish) is a village in the Nafusa Mountains of Libya, located about 113 kilometres (70 mi) southwest of Libya's capital Tripoli. Al-Qawalish is divided into two parts: west Al-Qawalish and east Al-Qawalish, separated by a canyon and is home to approximately 7,000 people.

== Libyan civil war battle ==
Al-Qawalish was captured by Libyan rebels on 7 July 2011 during the Nafusa Mountains campaign of the Libyan civil war. Nine rebels were killed in the six-hour battle, with no information on casualties from the pro-Gaddafi forces.

Previously between 30 June and 3 July, rebels attempted to advance from Kikla toward the town of al-Qawalish. If they took the town the road would be open to Gharyan. However, the rebels were unable to move forward and nine opposition fighters were killed and dozens wounded. During the battle, loyalist snipers took positions on a water tower between al-Qawalish and rebel positions, just a few hundred meters away, at Kikla.

On 6 July, rebels launched an attack on al-Qawalish with hundreds of fighters. They did so after NATO aircraft intensified bombing of the area and finally gave rebels the green light to advance. After several hours rebel fighters advanced a couple of kilometers towards al-Qawalish. Al-Qawalish was finally captured after six hours of fighting. One rebel fighter was reportedly killed and five wounded during the opposition offensive. It was unclear how many government soldiers were killed.

On 13 July, loyalist forces attacked al-Qawalish again, and this time the rebels retreated. Some of them claimed the reason being for the pull-back that they ran out of ammunition. Government troops started the attack after a group of rebels attempted to advance east of the town toward Gharyan. The loyalists quickly swept through Qawalish from the east and reached as far as the checkpoint on the western edge of the village. Still, by the evening, the rebels counter-attacked and after a five-hour battle they retook the town and chased loyalist forces to the outskirts of Asabah. During the fighting, two rebels were killed and 17 wounded.
