= Nafusa Mountains campaign =

Series of battles in the Libyan Civil War (2011)

- Part of the Libyan Civil War
Date	1 March – 18 August 2011
Location	Nafusa Mountains, Libya
Result	Indecisive: Rebels start an offensive toward the coast in mid-August.
Territorial changes	Pro-Gaddafi forces retake Gharyan, Kikla, Yafran and Rayayna from early March to late May, but lose all of their gains except Gharyan in June.; Rebel-held al Galaa cut off and surrounded by pro-Gaddafi forces until the recapture of Yafran; Rebels capture and hold the Wazzin border crossing, with some clashes spilling into Tunisia.; Rebels capture all towns around the mountains from June to August.; Rebels capture Gharyan on 18 August.

Belligerents
(Libya) Anti-Gaddafi forces; National Liberation Army; Tunisia; Tunisian Army; Tunisian National Guard; (Tunisia) Police Force and Customs Officials; (United Nations) UNSC forces; NATO command	Libyan Arab Jamahiriya

Commanders and leaders
(Libya) Col. Mokhtar Milad Fernana (Zintan commander) (Libya) Cdr. Mohammed Ali Madani † (1st Zintan commander) (Libya) Cdr. Osama Juwaili (2nd Zintan commander) (Libya) Cdr. Ali al-Hajj (Yafran commander)	(Libya) Col. Shu'ayb al-Firjani (Zintan area)

Strength
7,000~ 200+ rest of Nafusa mountain Towns	2,000–4,000; 40–50 tanks 40 technicals (Nalut-Zintan); 8 MRLs (in Zintan)

Casualties and losses
517–534 killed* 136 missing	397 killed** 215 – 295 captured** several tanks destroyed** 10+ tanks or armoured vehicles captured
- *The number of dead on the rebel side also includes civilians. **Based largely on unconfirmed rebel claims

The Nafusa Mountains campaign was a series of battles in the Libyan Civil War, fought between loyalist pro-Gaddafi forces and rebel anti-Gaddafi forces in the Nafusa Mountains and, at a later period, in the surrounding plains of western Libya. The mountain range is of strategic importance due to its close proximity to Tripoli, the Libyan capital. Along with the city of Misrata, the Nafusa Mountains region was one of the major rebel strongholds in the Tripolitania region of the country.

== Massacre Of Iznasen ==
The Nafusa mountains are heavily populated by ethnic Berbers, a group which suffered intense persecution under Gaddafi's rule. Gaddafi imposed bans on the teaching of the Berber language and on the use of traditional Berber names. In a leaked 2008 diplomatic cable, Gaddafi warned Berber leaders "You can call yourselves whatever you want inside your homes – Berbers, Children of Satan, whatever – but you are only Libyans when you leave your homes."

One of the first cities to stage protests against Gaddafi's rule in February 2011, was the town of Zintan. Zintan was home to several former Libyan military officers who participated in the failed 1993 Libyan coup attempt; the city is thought to have high anti-Gaddafi sentiment.

Very soon, the protests spread to the whole country and by the end of February most of the towns in the Nafusa Mountains were under opposition control.

== Campaign ==
=== Loyalists retake Gharyan, rebels surrounded ===
1–20 March

On 1 March, loyalist forces started offensive operations south of Tripoli with the aim of retaking territory lost in previous days to the rebels. Their first target was the city of Gharyan.

Gharyan was seen as a strategic town, because it was the largest in the Nafusa Mountains, a direct gateway to the Jabal al Gharbi District from Tripoli and was part of the defence ring loyalist forces were establishing around the capital.

During the night between the 1 and 2 March, loyalist forces came into the town, under the cover of darkness. On the morning of 2 March, the rebels realised that the town was overrun by government troops. Soldiers had a list of opposition members and started to round up all of the rebels in Gharyan. Gharyan had been retaken by the government, on the same day as the nearby city of Sabratha, located west of Tripoli.

As news of the retaking of Gharyan spread, the rebels found out that Gaddafi's forces were preparing an assault to retake Zintan, the first town in western Libya to throw off his rule. Around 40 trucks and armoured vehicles fitted with anti-aircraft guns were spotted 30 kilometers away heading to the city. Young people in Zintan took the fight to pro-Gaddafi forces, launching a series of "preventative attacks" on army barracks, checkpoints and other installations to gather weapons and equipment. At sunset, the city had been attacked three times and all repelled.

On 6 March, loyalist forces attempted another attack on Zintan which resulted in the deaths of 5–6 rebels and later rebels claimed that some 20 loyalist soldiers were killed. Government troops did not manage to enter the town. However, they had surrounded it and positioned mobile Grad rocket-launchers on the outskirts. By this point, government forces had also surrounded the towns of Yafran and Nalut.

On 18 March, rebel forces from Nalut attacked a government checkpoint on the outskirts of the town. Four government soldiers and one rebel were killed in the fighting and 18 loyalist soldiers were captured.

=== Zintan offensive stopped ===
21–31 March

Held by anti-Gaddafi protesters by 1 March (Checkered: Maximum Loyalists gains, April–May) Rebel advances by 1 August Rebel gains after the western coastal offensive in August Last loyalist pockets

On 21 March, the pro-Gaddafi forces launched an offensive against the city. By 22 March, loyalist troops were pushed back from the eastern outskirts of the town, but were still holding a foothold in the northern outskirts. As of 24 March, heavy shelling of Zintan by artillery and tank fire was ongoing. The rebels claimed they captured or destroyed several tanks, seized trucks loaded with 1,200 Grad missiles and fuel tanks, and captured five Gaddafi troops. During the offensive against Zintan, 16–21 people were killed in the town, eight of them rebels.

At the same time as the attack on Zintan started, there was fighting at Yafran in which nine people were killed.

=== Shelling of towns, intermittent skirmishes ===
1–16 April

On 1 April, after a week of a lull in fighting, loyalist troops were on the move again. Government firing of Grad rockets was hitting the western side of Zintan. Government troops had surrounded the town of Kikla, 60 kilometers east of Zintan, and were attacking another nearby town of Aquilla.

On 3 April, Yafran was shelled by loyalist artillery killing two people.

On 4 April, government troops captured the town of Kikla and started a rocket bombardment of Nalut.

On 5 April, Al Jazeera English reported that the rebels in Nalut and Zintan infiltrated Yafran and helped their allies there to fight against government forces. They were able to push back Gaddafi's forces from Yafran.

On 8 April, Al Jazeera English reported that NATO airstrikes struck weapons depots belonging to pro-Gaddafi forces located 15 kilometers southeast of Zintan. Residents heard 14 explosions and saw some of the buildings burning.

On 9 April, refugees from al-Galaa told Reuters that Gaddafi's forces have been burning water wells with petroleum and killing sheep, and promised to "rape all girls".

On 12 April, Al Jazeera reported that anti-Gaddafi forces were able to take Zintan's western gate. Alongside this they were also able to stop loyalist forces from taking the road leading from Nalut to Tunis.

On 14 April, Al Jazeera English reported that rebels had repelled loyalist forces in the al-Haraba district, west of Rihaibat, after some minor clashes. However, the towns in the area remained under siege.

On 15 April, eight rebels were killed and 11 wounded in heavy fighting near Yafran in which they also captured several loyalist soldiers. The rebels also claimed that NATO air-strikes had hit loyalist armored units in the vicinity of both Yafran and Zintan.

=== New loyalist offensive, rebel fight for supply line ===
17 April – 1 May

On 17 April, a heavy artillery bombardment of all rebel-held areas in the Jabal al Gharbi District started and continued into the next day. The loyalist attack left 110 people dead, including both civilians and rebels, according to residents. Loyalist forces were reported by the rebels to be "within striking distance" of Jadu and Ar Rajban, but had been once again repelled from Zintan and Nalut.

The shelling continued on 19 April, with four more people killed in Nalut.

On 21 April, Al Jazeera reported that the opposition forces had seized the border crossing with Tunisia, Wazzin, forcing one hundred Gaddafi soldiers to retreat into Tunisia where they handed themselves in to Tunisian authorities. The rebels also claimed to have killed 15 soldiers and captured another 14 on the Libyan side of the border. However, all of the 100 soldiers returned from Tunisia into Libya the next day.

NATO reported that it conducted strikes against loyalist targets in the vicinity of Zintan on 22 April. Two tanks, two bunkers, and some buildings were claimed to have been hit.

On 23 April, rebels started to bring in supplies, through the border crossing at Wazzin, to the towns under siege. However, the same day it was reported that Yafran had been taken by loyalist forces.

On 24 April, a loyalist artillery barrage hit the border crossing at Wazzin in an attempt to recapture the town. Also, four people were killed and nine wounded when Grad rockets hit Zintan. The next day, two rebels were killed and three wounded in further fighting near Nalut in which the rebels claimed to have killed 45 loyalist soldiers and captured 17, although no independent sources could confirm the opposition's claims.

On 25 April, Voice of Russia reported that rebels were still resisting in Yafran in spite of the pro-Gaddafi forces advance into the town two days previously.

On 27 April, rebels claimed that loyalists fired at least 20 Grad rockets into the city centre of Zintan. Five houses were destroyed in the bombardment, which also damaged a local hospital and left three people injured. The Daily Telegraph reported that RAF warplanes under NATO command attacked loyalist vehicles in the region, striking a tank near Mizda and destroying a self-propelled gun near Yafran.

On 28 April, loyalist forces re-captured the Wazzin border crossing with Tunisia after a swift advance in which they pushed the rebels back over the border into Tunisia where the fighting continued on the edge of the Tunisian border town of Dehiba. State TV stated that several rebels were killed and others captured in the attack on the border post. Later during the day, the rebels attempted a counter-attack. Initially, they claimed to have re-taken the post. However, Reuters denied it later by confirming that the loyalists were still in full control. During the confusion when it was thought that the rebels had won scores of civilian vehicles attempted to re-enter Libya from Tunisia. But, they quickly turned back when they found Gaddafi's forces were still at the border crossing. Heavy fighting continued into the night, with rebels apparently massing for a renewed attack against the better-armed loyalists and during the evening the rebels once again claimed to have re-taken the crossing after they received reinforcements from Zintan. Still, this claim was also later found to be untrue.

The next morning, loyalist troops advanced from the crossing post of Wazzin in pursuit of the rebels, who had retreated onto Tunisian soil after a night of fighting, over the border and engaged them in the center of the town of Dehiba. Soon after that clashes between Gaddafi and Tunisian troops were reported, but the Tunisian news agency TAP said Tunisian forces only fired in the air and did not clash directly with the Libyans. The Tunisian military soon seized loyalist troops and led them back over the border. At the same time, the rebels claimed for a third time to have re-taken the border post which was apparently confirmed by an AFP news crew. However, after nightfall, Gaddafi's forces resumed their bombardment of the crossing in an apparent attempt to return and the government said it had regained control over the Libyan side of the border. Meanwhile, air strikes hit Gaddafi forces surrounding the town of Zintan.

On 1 May, a caller on Al Jazeera said that the city of Zintan came under attack from Grad missiles the previous day, and pro-Gaddafi forces attempted to enter the town. During the bombardment, NATO planes could be heard overhead. The next day, it was reported that rebels in the town of Yafran were under heavy siege and running out of vital supplies, contradicting earlier reports by the rebels that the town was captured by loyalist forces. In addition, rebels had apparently retaken the border crossing at Wazzin, while they claimed that NATO air-strikes destroyed 10–12 loyalist vehicles east of Zintan.

=== War of attrition, new loyalist advances ===
1 – 30 May

On 3 May, forces loyal to Libyan leader Muammar Gaddafi bombarded the rebel-held town of Zintan in the Western Mountains with over 40 Grad rockets late on Tuesday, a rebel spokesman said. "They were fired in two salvoes," the spokesman, named Abdulrahman, said by telephone. "The last salvo landed moments ago. We can hear NATO aircraft overhead now." A Libyan ambulance driver from Zintan who crossed into Tunisia on Tuesday told Reuters the town had come under intense shelling by pro-Gaddafi forces. It was reported that 55 civilians were killed or wounded in the shelling.

On 7 May, 11 rebels were killed and 50 wounded, some critically, during another advance by loyalist troops towards Zintan's eastern edge.

On 11 May, it was reported that two rebels were killed and 15 wounded after coming under sniper fire in the village of Rya Ina, 9 miles east of Zintan. Loyalist snipers also fired on an ambulance transporting a wounded person, but no casualties were reported. Six rebels were also killed in an attempt to block a road used by loyalists, which resulted in an exchange of fire with pro-Gaddafi villagers.

On 18 May, rebels in the Nafusa Mountains issued a call for help to the National Transitional Council in the hopes of alleviating the constant loyalist siege on their towns. The same day, Al Jazeera English, citing rebel fighters from in and near Yafran, reported that the town had been cut off from food and medical supplies as a result of loyalist attacks with rockets and Grad missiles. Pro-Gaddafi forces were intensifying their shelling of towns in the upper part of the mountain range in an attempt to dislodge rebels from the high ground.

At dawn on 19 May, Gaddafi forces have unleashed their biggest attack yet against Zintan. The attack started when about 150 loyalist infantry troops began firing on three fronts near the town. They were supported by about 40 vehicles, including long-range "Grad" rocket launchers and 14.5 mm heavy machine guns with a range of 6 kilometers. The offensive continued well into the next day during which one rebel was killed and several wounded. On 21 May, the rebel commander in Zintan, Haji Usama, stated that he believed the intense loyalist attack was launched in order to capture the nearby town of Rayayan, the eastern half of which declared its support for the rebels a month previously. Although, the western half of Rayayan was reported to have stayed loyalist, partially due to the fact that former Gaddafi intelligence head Nasar al-Mabout lives there. Later, it was confirmed that, during the two days of heavy fighting, loyalist forces had managed to advance through the village of Al Rayayan and break through two rebel defence lines outside Zintan, despite NATO bombing runs on government troops and ammunition depots in the area.

By 22 May, the town of al-Galaa, with a population of 16,000 people, was reported to be on the verge of being overrun by loyalist forces. Also, government troops had managed to captured the western part of Yafran, which includes the hospital, while rebels were still holding on to the eastern section of the city. Some 1,000 people were still in Yafran, half of them rebels. Loyalists once again attempted to capture the Wazzin border crossing, according to rebels. One rebel and nine loyalists were killed before the pro-Gaddafi forces retreated back to positions in the vicinity of Rayayan.

Meanwhile, allegiances amongst part of the Nafusa mountain population remained unclear, as the towns (generally held by forces loyal to Gaddafi) on the plains north of the mountain provide a lot of the food resources in this arid region. Military campaigning from the rebel forces on 22 and 23 May, to take definite control on the mountain towns of Tamzin and Ar-Rayyan (Al Rayayna) met with mixed success. Reportedly, many villagers and townspeople were hesitant to take sides in the conflict, in part due to fear of reprisals from Gaddafi forces.

On 24 May, rebel commanders in Zintan stated that villages in Zintan's surroundings were in danger of falling very soon. By this point, loyalist forces were only 10 kilometers from Zintan.

On 27 May, overnight the town of Zintan came under heavy rocket attack from Gaddafi forces, a foreign doctor told Reuters. "There must have been about a hundred (strikes). I wasn't counting, but there were four or five rockets every half an hour or 15 minutes," Anja Wolz of Doctors Without Borders said by telephone. He stated that no one was seriously hurt, but the next day the doctors evacuated from the city due to the shelling.

On 28 May, the rebels stated that five civilians died in Yafran and al-Galaa due to the fighting and of heart attacks. They also claimed to have attacked loyalist forces at Kikla and captured 32 government soldiers in fighting that also killed three rebels. Also, a rebel spokesman confirmed that Yafran had fallen under loyalist control. Al-Galaa and a few small towns to the east of Yafran remained under tenuous rebel control.

=== Rebel counterattack ===
1 June – 6 July

On 1 June, rebels captured the towns of Shakshuk and Gasr Al-Hajj, located in the plains north of the mountains. Shakshuk is home to a critical power station that supplies electricity to many towns in the mountains, and rebels hoped to use it to bring electricity back to the mountains. On 2 June, rebels reported that they had recaptured Yafran from loyalist forces as part of the same offensive supported by NATO airstrikes on loyalist positions near the town. Rebel fighters in Zintan reported that they had recaptured the town of Kikla and were surrounding al-Rayayna and Bir Ayyad which lies between Zintan and the besieged towns of Yefran and Al Galaa.

On 4 June, rebels captured the crossroads town of Bir Ayyad, which opened the road to the besieged cities of Yafran and Al Galaa.

On 6 June, Reuters journalists entered Yafran with rebel fighters, confirming earlier rebel reports that they had completely retaken the city.

On 12 June 10 rebels were killed and 49 wounded in artillery attacks on Zintan. At the same time, rebels started their offensive on the village of Rayayna where they took control of half of the village.

On 13 June, rebels captured the whole village of Al-Rayayna, where rebels claimed that 20 civilians had been killed. Rebels also attacked loyalist positions in nearby Zawiet al-Baqool, but the government troops still held firm. Talha Al-Jiwali, a rebel fighter, claimed that 100 loyalist soldiers died in both battles, while nine rebels were killed and 35 wounded at Al-Rayayna.

On 14 June, rebels recaptured the town of Kikla after Gaddafi forces pulled out of the town and retreated at around 9 kilometers of the city. Gaddafi troops also shelled the rebels around the border of Tunisia, with some rockets landing again on Tunisia soil.

By 15 June, rebels had taken control of the previously contested town of Zawiet al-Baqool, located 20 kilometers from Zintan. Pro-Gaddafi positions on the outskirts of the town were deserted, and retreating loyalist troops had left behind clothes, shoes and ammunition. Rebels also claimed that after the capture of the town, they were moving on to the loyalist held towns of Lawania and Ghanymma. On the same day, rebels took over Lawania. Meanwhile, Reuters correspondents in Gharyan reported that the city, occupied by loyalist forces since the beginning of March, was experiencing some unrest as rebels pushed closer to it.

On 17 June, rebels attacked the loyalist-held towns of Takut and Ghazaya, located north of Nalut. These towns had served as the base of operations from which loyalist troops had been attacking the Wazzin border crossing and Nalut. NATO had also struck loyalist positions in 'Ayn al Ghazaya.

On 18 June, heavy battles took place north of Nalut in the village of Takut, which was attacked by rebels day before. Eight rebels were reportedly killed and 13 wounded in the fighting while rebels claimed that they had killed 45 loyalists and destroyed six armoured vehicles.

By 20 June, rebels stopped their offensive against Ghazaya, after not being able to dislodge Gaddafi forces in the town during three days of fighting in which 15 opposition fighters were killed and 48 wounded. Also, rebels claimed to have shut off a pipeline in Rayayna that supplies the oil refinery in the loyalist-held city of Zawiya with crude oil from the Ubari oilfield. The report was later confirmed by The New York Times journalists. The following day, Human Rights Watch confirmed that loyalists had planted over 150 anti-personnel landmines in at least one location in the mountains near the Tunisian border.

On 26 June, loyalist forces tried to attack rebel fighters in Bir Ayyad from behind, thus cutting them off. In response rebel fighters launched a counter-attack on Bir al-Ghanam, located 50 kilometers south of Zawiya. At least two rebel fighters were killed during the fighting.

On 28 June, rebels managed to capture Al Qaa military barracks and ammunition depot, some 20 kilometers south of Zintan. Rebel fighters attacked the base at 6:00 am with one group assigned to attack the base and a second to cut off reinforcements. At noon about 100 loyalist soldiers retreated to the nearby Twama base. Rebels lost two fighters in the battle and eight remained wounded. The capture was confirmed by an Al Jazeera report (with video) which also noted that the weapons included two Russian tanks and that these ammunition gains would provide an "enormous morale booster" and greatly increase "momentum...that the rebel forces have been building up for quite a while". Later, a Reuters reporter stated that the rebels were actually not able to get all of the weapons because they were prevented after a fire that broke out across the whole depot.

The next day, 29 June, it was confirmed that, despite reports of a significant capture in arms by the rebels, they mostly captured ammunition and rockets, but no weapons to fire them from. Rebels had captured only two T-55 tanks, dozens of military vehicles, dynamite, 9M32M missiles (but without the missile launchers), boxes of ammunition (without guns for the ammunition), and dust-covered bombs. Most of the ammunition and bombs dated back decades, some to even 1972. Also, it was revealed that one of the two rebels killed did not die in battle but when he was attempting to forcefully open one of the boxes, like many others, who ripped apart ammunition cases with crowbars or gun butts. In addition, most of the 70 storage bunkers at the base were already previously partly or totally destroyed by NATO's airstrikes. Only a handful were still intact. By day's end the rebel momentum seemed to have faltered as hundreds of people fled the base, after a rumor that the pro-Gaddafi soldiers were returning, which they did not. A rebel from Jadu stated that, in contrast to previous rebel claims of a momentum gathering for a push on the capital, talk of an attack on Tripoli was premature. In his words "We are going to have to organize ourselves out here first."

On 1 July, the rebel attack on Bir al-Ghanam faltered. Rebels were massing earlier in the day on a ridge near the town for an attack on the city. However, later, a heavy loyalist rocket barrage from inside Bir al-Ghanam hit the rebels forcing them to retreat from their positions on the outskirts of the town. Some of the rockets were landing as far back as Bir-Ayyad, 30 kilometers to the south. In the afternoon, a Reuters reporter claimed that the rebels had returned to the same positions on the outskirts of Bir al-Ghanam. However, the next day, a rebel military spokesman confirmed that the opposition forces had still not re-captured their previous positions and were hoping to accomplish that within the next 48 hours.

During fighting between 30 June and 3 July, the rebels attempted to advance from Kikla toward the town of al-Qawalish (which holds a western and an eastern part, separated by a canyon). If they took the town the road would be open to Gharyan. However, the rebels were unable to move forward and nine opposition fighters were killed and dozens wounded. During the battle, loyalist snipers took positions on a water tower between al-Qawalish and rebel positions, just few hundred meters away, at Kikla.

On 6 July, rebels launched an attack on al-Qawalish with hundreds of fighters. They did so after NATO aircraft intensified bombing of the area and finally gave rebels the green light to advance. After several hours rebel fighters advanced a couple of kilometers towards al-Qawalish. Al-Qawalish was finally captured after six hours of fighting. One rebel fighter was reportedly killed and five wounded during the opposition offensive. It was unclear if any government soldiers were killed. After the fall of al-Qawalish, the town was looted and burned by rebel forces over a period of two days, due to animosity between the Berber and the smaller Mashaashia tribe which takes residence in the village. Reports also emerged of burning, looting and even abuse of civilians in at least three other towns and villages that had been recently captured by the rebels. In addition, the bodies of five loyalist soldiers were found rotting in a heap on the road between Qawalish and Um al-Jersan. They appeared to have been killed execution style, with three of them having their arms or legs bound.

=== Rebel advance stopped ===
7–27 July

On 10 July, rebel-held al-Qawalish came under rocket attack by loyalist forces from Asabah, but the rebels did not retreat.

On 13 July, loyalist forces attacked Qawalish again. This time the rebels retreated, some of them claiming that they had to pull back because they ran out of ammunition. Government troops started the attack after a group of rebels attempted to advance east of the town toward Gharyan. The loyalists quickly swept through Qawalish from the east and reached as far as the checkpoint on the western edge of the village. However, by the evening, the rebels counter-attacked. After a five-hour battle, they retook the town and chased loyalist forces to the outskirts of Asabah. During the fighting, eight rebels were killed and 27 wounded.

On 14 July, rebels retreated back to al-Qawalish from the outskirts of Asabah after reaching within 6 km of the hamlet in order to regroup. The same day, rebels stated that they had run into and cleared a minefield made by loyalist forces near al-Qawalish.

On 24 July, Libyan opposition forces repelled an offensive by government troops against Qawalish. Witnesses said dozens of civilians were sent to the area just before the attack by the loyalists. The opposition forces claimed that the civilians were being used as human shields by government troops. However, the Libyan government stated that they were all Gaddafi supporters and state TV showed a convoy of civilians waving green flags which they stated was attacked by the rebels. One rebel was killed during the fighting, the 16-year-old son of the top rebel Zintan commander.

As the offensive in the eastern part of the mountains halted, rebels in the western part of the mountains planned a new offensive. On 27 July, correspondents reported seeing around 20 pickup trucks moving towards Nalut, while 30 more were congregating to the east. Omar Fakkan, a rebel commander, reported that rebels from Nalut and nearby towns were massing for a new offensive against 'Ayn al Ghazaya to be begun in the upcoming days.

=== Late July rebel offensive ===
28–31 July

On 28 July, rebels confirmed their earlier plans and attacked 'Ayn al Ghazaya and four other villages on the road between rebel-held Shakshuk and Ghazaya with infantry, technicals, tanks and rocket artillery. Hundreds of rebel fighters took part in the operation against an estimated 2,000 to 4,000 loyalist soldiers stationed in the valley. After several hours of fighting, rebel forces announced they had captured the towns of Takut, al-Ruwais, Badr and al-Jawsh, although loyalist forces retook al-Jawsh in a counterattack shortly afterwards. Further west, Ghazaya was bombarded by rebel artillery and tanks in an attempt to soften up defences before making an assault on the town. Eight hours since the start of the offensive, after heavy fighting and a bombardment by rebel artillery, the opposition claimed that loyalist troops pulled out of the town of Ghazaya. But that claim was not confirmed by either Al Jazeera or any other sources. Also, later in the evening, The Guardian newspaper stated that fighting was still ongoing in the outskirts of the town. The rebels also reported they captured the towns of al-Ruwais and Badr, and surrounded Umm al-Far. According to the opposition, they were negotiating with loyalist troops inside Umm al-Far. Four rebels were killed during the offensive and 20 wounded. The number of casualties among loyalist forces was unknown but 18 government soldiers were captured by the opposition troops. The Gaddafi government claimed that 190 rebels were killed by 29 July, since the start of the offensive.

On 30 July, the rebel offensive in the valley continued with opposition forces attacking the last loyalist stronghold in Tiji and surrounding the area. They were up against an estimated 500 loyalist soldiers. Up to this point, the rebels had succeeded in capturing the villages of Hawamid, Takut, and Ghazaya in their drive to clear pro-Gaddafi forces from the mountain region's surroundings.

On 31 July, rebels recaptured the previously gained and lost village of al-Jawsh and were engaged in a battle for the town of Tiji in a strong sandstorm. However, they lost al-Jawsh once again a day later when loyalists counterattacked, sending the rebels retreating half way along the road to the town of Shakshuk. Reports showed that rebels were not acclaimed as liberators in Ghazaya, as all the 5,000 inhabitants escaped to pro-Gaddafi zones to avoid them. Rebels acknowledged that Tiji was also a pro-Gaddafi town.

=== Rebel capture of Bir al-Ghanam ===
1–12 August

On 2 August, rebels had to stop their offensive on Tiji because they ran out of ammunition. The next day, three rebels were killed near Tiji by a Grad missile.

On 4 August, three rebels were killed near Bir al-Ghanam. Rebels also admitted that their offensive toward Tripoli had completely stalled after one month.

On 5 August, rebel officials said that they had set an ultimatum for Gaddafi forces to surrender in Tiji (which rebels claim is surrounded) by the following day. The rebels used loud-hailers to appeal to a tribal chief close to Colonel Gaddafi, to evacuate civilians from Tiji and broker the withdrawal or surrender of loyalist forces.

On 6 August, rebels launched another attack on Bir al-Ghanam with hundreds of fighters, hoping to take the small town and thus opening their way towards Zawiya and other coastal cities. A few hours later, Bir al-Ghanam was under rebel control. Eight rebel fighters were killed during the attack while the number of killed loyalist forces remained unknown. According to the AFP, rebels were able to advance within 20 km of the city of Sorman before encountering heavy resistance from loyalist forces and traded tank fire with them on the road to the coast.

On 7 August, the Libyan government announced that its forces had recaptured Bir al-Ghanam from anti-Gaddafi forces. This was denied by the rebels who claimed that, on the contrary, they were able to push 10 more kilometers northeast from Bir al-Ghanam and were preparing to push towards Zawiya. Rebel claims were later confirmed by an Al Jazeera and Reuters correspondent in the Nafusa mountains who also confirmed that rebels managed to push 30 kilometers towards city of Sorman and were positioned 50 kilometers outside of it.

On 10 August, five rebels were killed and 10 wounded in fighting near Bir al-Ghanam. Rebel commanders claimed to be 5 kilometers from Sorman's outskirts, and 20 from Zawiya's outskirts and were also making advances on the road towards the town of 'Aziziya directly south of Tripoli.

On 11 August, rebels captured the village of Shalghouda and claimed the capture of the villages of al-Nasr and Bir Shuaib, some 25 kilometers from Zawiya. One rebel fighter was killed and four wounded.

=== Rebel recapture of Gharyan, end of campaign ===
13–18 August

On 13 August, opposition forces managed to enter the strategic town of Gharyan and capture the city center after a four-hour battle which resulted in loyalist troops retreating. However, after a brief lull, government forces returned into Gharyan with a large number of reinforcements, and fighting in the city resumed.

On 14 August, rebels stated that they controlled "70 percent" of the city.

On 15 August, rebels reported they controlled Gharyan, although some reports suggested that fighting was still ongoing. The opposition forces also launched an attack against Tiji, where the Gaddafi government claimed 40 rebels were killed, though the rebels claimed they had taken the town. Later that day, Al Jazeera Arabic confirmed the fall of Tiji and stated that the rebels were moving against nearby Badr. Opposition forces also reportedly surrounded Assaba and were negotiating the surrender of loyalist soldiers trapped inside the village, though this claim could not be confirmed.

On 17 August, rebels claim to be in control of Badr.

On 18 August, journalists confirmed that the rebels were in complete control of Gharyan, thus effectively driving the last loyalist forces from the Nafusa Mountains and marking the end of the Nafusa Mountains campaign.

== Aftermath ==
=== Rebel advance towards the coast, new front opens ===
On 13 August, Reuters confirmed that the rebels moved north from Al Nasr and advanced 7 kilometers towards Zawiya.

On 14 August, rebels captured the city of Sorman and that they lost 10 dead and 34 wounded fighting there. There was also ongoing in fighting city of Sabratha, and the border crossing of Ras Ajdir had also been attacked. Later on the same day, a rebel spokesman announced the capture of Ajaylat, though this could not be confirmed A later journalist report confirmed that Sorman had fallen earlier, and stated that Sabratha had been taken on 15 August after loyalist forces fled in the afternoon.

=== Consequences ===
The conflict has had humanitarian impacts. Médecins Sans Frontières sent a team to help with wounded in Zintan. As of 21 May, Al Galaa was reported to be without water and electricity for seven weeks. Also, more than 45,000 Libyan refugees were reported in the Tunisian region of Tataouine.

In June 2011, Le Figaro reported that France secretly airdropped significant quantities of arms in the Nafusa Mountains for the Berber rebels. The arms included assault rifles, machine guns, rocket-propelled grenades, and European-made MILAN anti-tank missiles. The French government later confirmed the reports, stating that the airdrops had started in June. On 5 July, French defense minister Gérard Longuet declared that the airdrops had ceased.
