= Battle of Gharyan (2019) =

- Part of Libyan civil war (2014-2020)
Date	4 April 2019 – 26 June 2019
Location	Gharyan, Libya
Result	GNA victory

Belligerents
(Libya) House of Representatives: France	(Libya) Government of National Accord

Commanders and leaders
(Libya) Field Marshal Khalifa Haftar (LNA supreme commander)	(Libya) Prime Minister Fayez al-Sarraj (head of Presidential Council)

Strength
Unknown	Unknown

Casualties and losses
Dozens killed 18 Captured	Unknown

The Battle of Gharyan, which unfolded from April 2019 to June 2019, was a significant conflict in the ongoing struggle for control in Libya. The opposing forces were the Libyan National Army (LNA), led by General Khalifa Haftar, and the Government of National Accord (GNA), headed by Prime Minister Fayez al-Sarraj.

== Initial Offensives ==
The offensive commenced on April 4, 2019, with the LNA capturing Gharyan on the first day. Subsequently, on April 8, 2019, reports from Libya al-Ahrar TV, as cited by The Libya Observer, indicated the arrival of a team of French "military experts" in Gharyan. These experts reportedly established a control room to monitor the attack on Tripoli, suggesting international involvement in the conflict.

On April 10, the GNA reported launching airstrikes on LNA targets within Gharyan. By April 15, the LNA military information division announced the arrival of "large reinforcements" in LNA-controlled Gharyan, signaling preparations for an intensified assault on the capital, Tripoli.

== Haftar's advances and GNA counterattacks ==
On May 13, the GNA declared that Haftar's forces had gained control over Tripoli airport and secured full control over Gharyan. However, the GNA air force continued to target these areas. On June 26, the GNA claimed the recapture of Gharyan, citing the deaths of numerous LNA soldiers in the town and the capture of at least 18 others. GNA's air force further targeted LNA convoys withdrawing from the area.

Between 20 and 29 August 2019, the LNA made several unsuccessful attempts to recapture Gharyan. The GNA, on the other hand, claimed on October 7 that UAE's drones had carried out attacks in Gharyan, south of the capital Tripoli.
