= Wazzin =

Wazzin وازن; ⵡⴰⵣⴻⵏ (Berber languages)
- Town
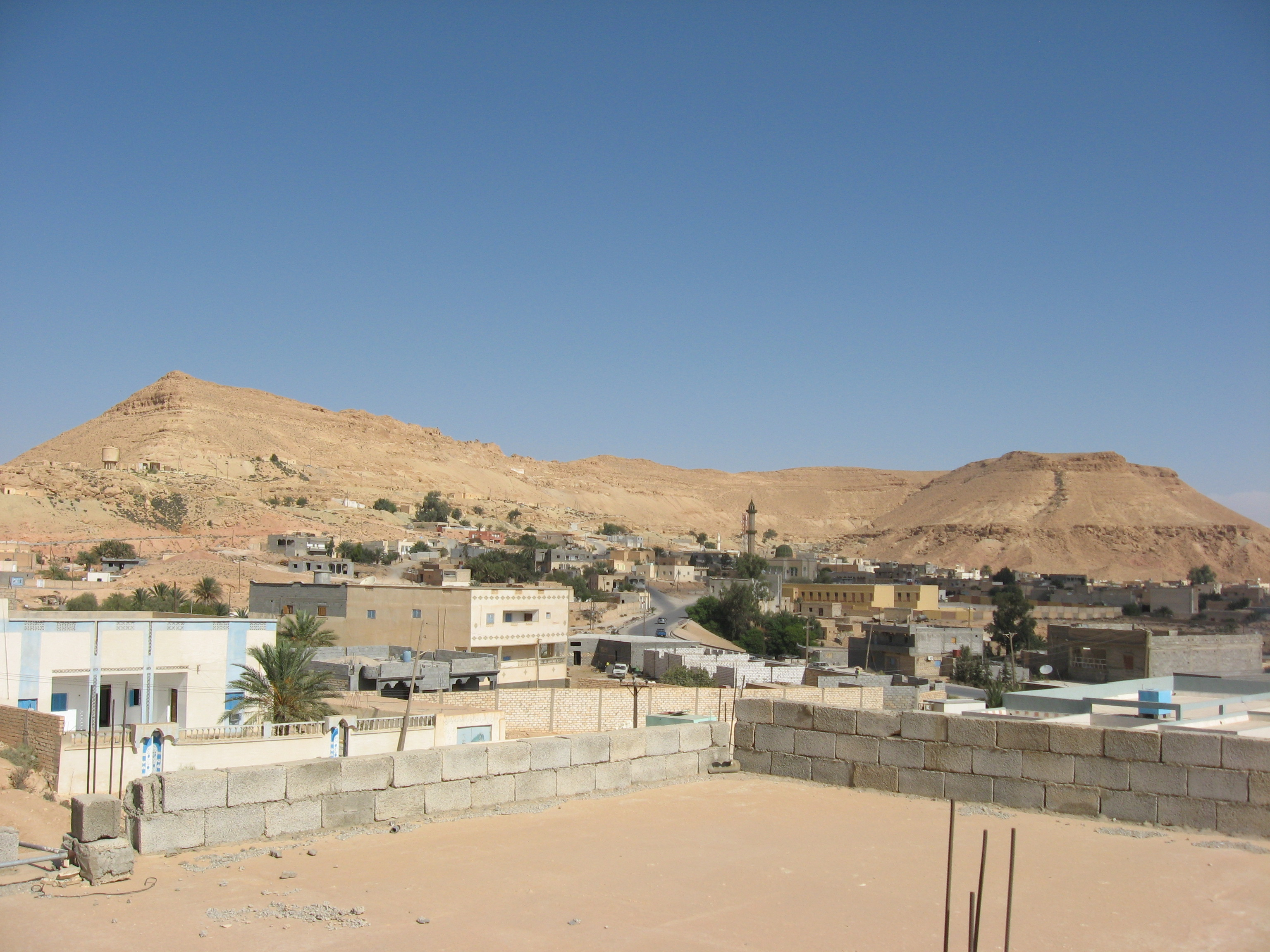
- Wazzin
- Interactive map of Wazzin
- Location in Libya
- Coordinates: 31°56′32″N 10°39′45″E
- Country: Libya
- Region: Tripolitania
- District: Nalut

Population (2006)
  - Total: 3,792
- Time zone: UTC+2 (EET)

Wazzin (Arabic: وازن Wāzzin; Berber languages: ⵡⴰⵣⴻⵏ, romanized: Wazen)) is a town in the western Tripolitania region at the western boundary of Libya. It serves as a border crossing to Tunisia. The town is located south-inland from the Mediterranean Sea coast, and is 360 kilometres (220 mi) west of Tripoli.

Wazzin is in the desert near the western end of the Nafusa Mountains range, in the Nalut District.

== History ==
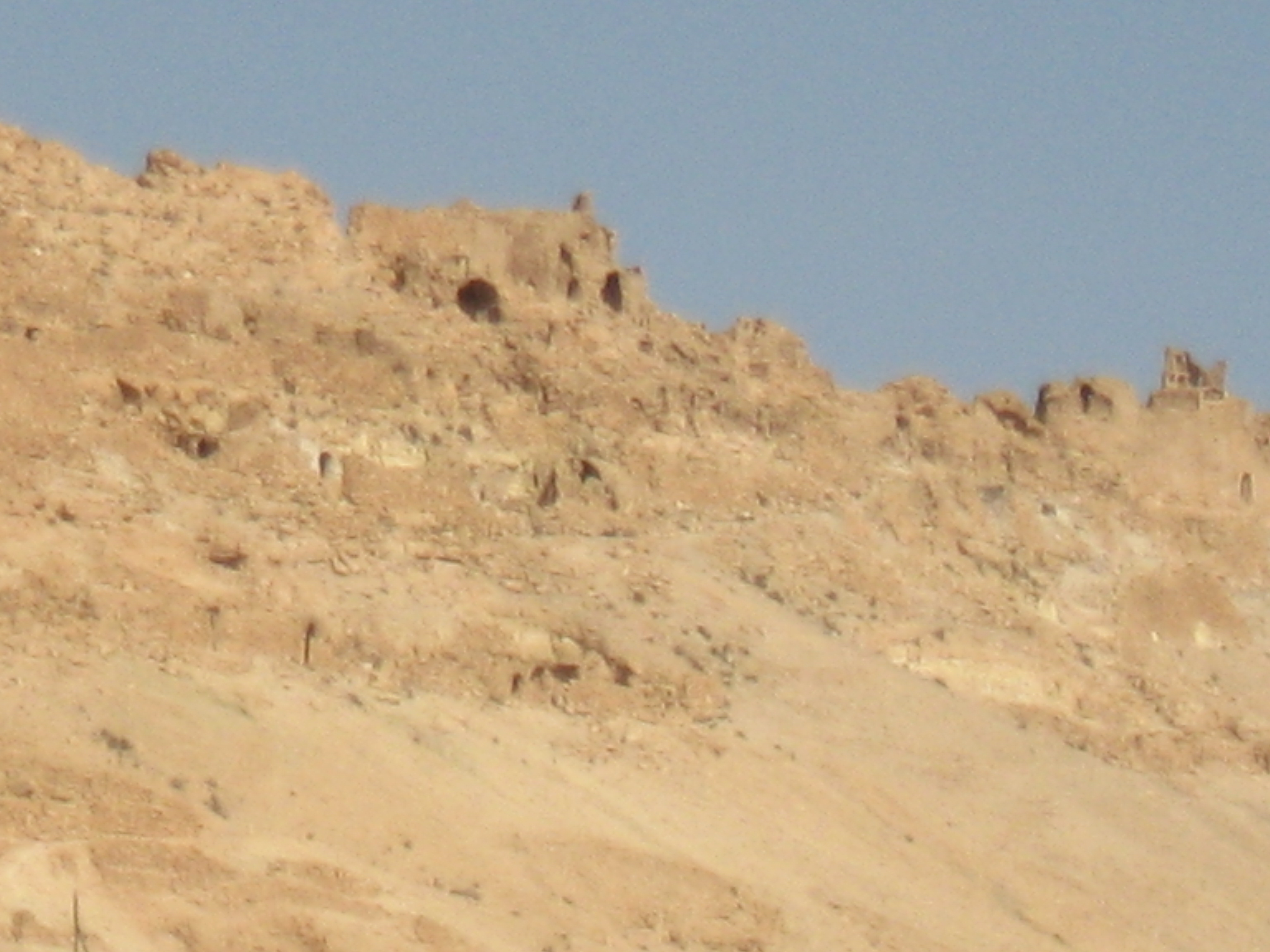
The ruins of Gasr Wazzin

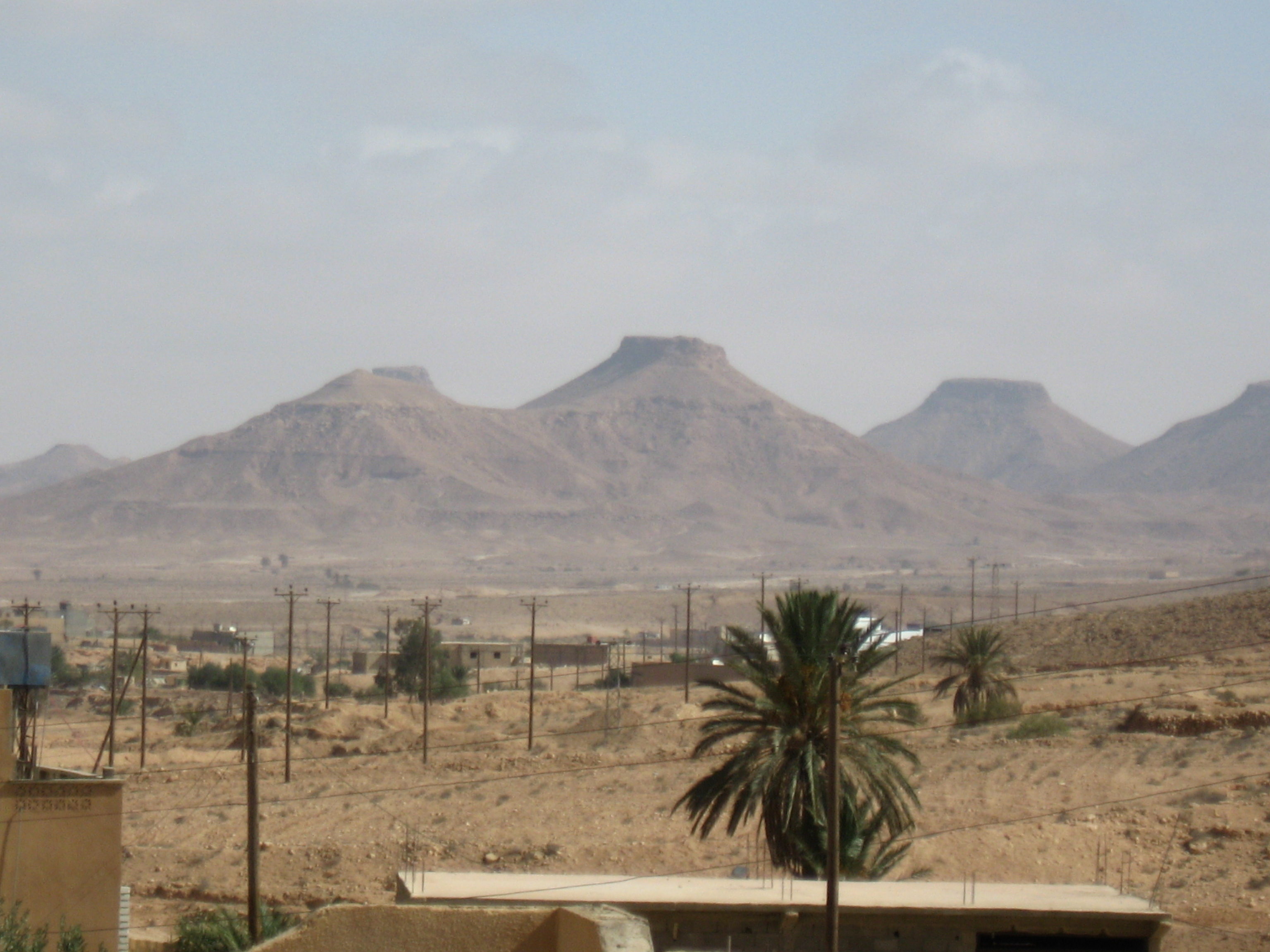
Wazzin in the desert, with the Nafusa Mountains.

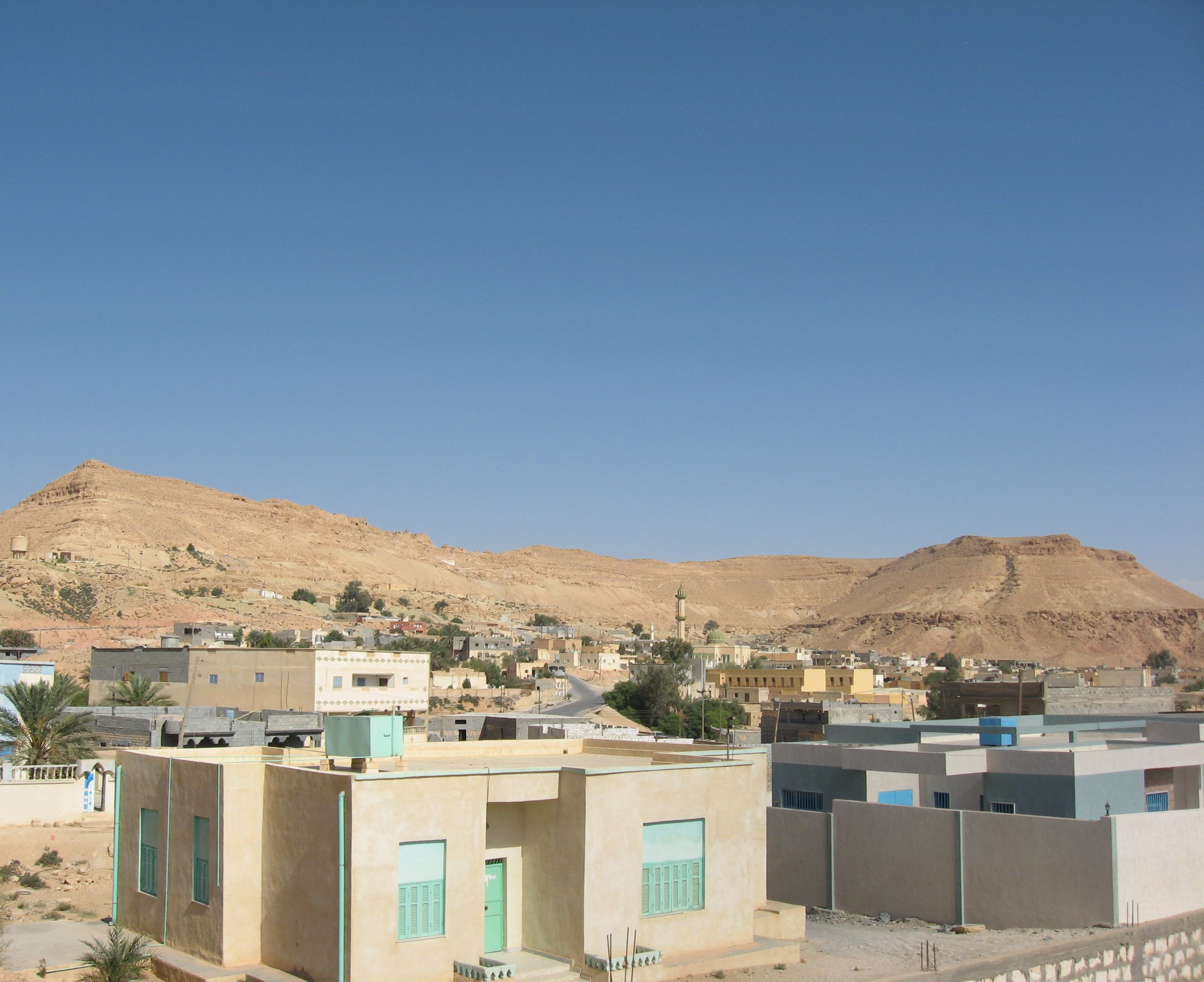
The town center.

=== Old town ===
The town is the seat of Gasr Wazzin, which was built in 1482 CE (860 AH anno hegirae). The Gasr has 360 rooms on 4 floors. The building has a rectangular shape, with a cistern for storing water in its center. It was used as a fortress and granary.

The Gasr Wazzin is surrounded by the old town district of present-day Wazzin, whose buildings are mainly gypsum based masonry. A network of tunnels is below this historic portion, and is reserved for women traveling around the old town, without encountering non-familial men.

=== 2011 Libyan civil war ===
On 21 April 2011, during the 2011 Libyan civil war, anti-Gaddafi fighters took over the control of the border crossing and 13 pro-Gaddafi officers defected to Tunisia. Since then control has been in flux. The Battles in Wazzin, the border, and nearby Nafusa Mountains are a campaign known as the 2011 Nafusa Mountain Campaign. The campaign has ended in a definite rebel victory with the capture of Gharyan, the last loyalist stronghold in the area.

== Demographics ==
The people of Wazzin are divided into two clans, Awlad Mahmoud and Arrbai'a, both of which have several subclans as shown in the table below.

Awlad Mahmoud	Arrbai'ah
Awlad 'uthman	Awlad 'li
Awlad 'abdurrahim	Awlad Mahammed
Awlad Jma'	Awlad Yahya
Annjajra	Awlad Sleman

== See also ==
- 2011 Nafusa Mountains Campaign
