= Bir al-Ghanam =

Bir al-Ghanam بئر الغنم
- Town
- Location in Libya
- Coordinates: 32°18′45″N 12°34′11″E
- Country: Libya
- Region: Tripolitania
- District: Zawiya

Population (2006)
  - Total: 3,375
- Time zone: UTC+2 (EET)

Bir al-Ghanam (Arabic: بئر الغنم) is a town in western Libya. It is located south of Zawiya. It was the site of several battles during the Libyan Civil War. It was occupied by anti-Gaddafi forces on 7 August, just a few weeks before they entered Tripoli.
