= Zintan Brigades =

Libyan rebel militia

Al-Zintan Revolutionaries' Military Council
- مجلس العسكري لثوار الزنتان
- Leaders: Kalifah Shahub; Osama al-Juwaili (2011-12); Muhammad Ali Madani †
- Dates active: May 2011 – present
- Headquarters: Tobruk
- Active regions: none
- Size: 2000 - 4000 {2012} Hundreds of fighters {2021}

The Zintan Brigades are armed units linked to the Libyan town of Zintan and its surrounding area, allied to the Libyan National Army. They played a large part in the Libyan Revolution which overthrew Gaddafi.

== Organization ==
The Zintan Brigades are under the leadership of the Zintan Revolutionaries' Military Council and currently consist of:

- The Lightning Bolt (Sawaiq) Brigade
- The Qaaqaa Brigade
- The Civic Brigade (لواء المدني)

The Airport Security Battalion (for Tripoli International Airport) was linked to the Zintan Brigades, but its current status is uncertain.

== History ==
The Zintan Revolutionaries' Military Council was formed in May 2011 to organize the military efforts and effectiveness of 23 militias in Zintan and the Nafusa mountains. The Council is one of the strongest militias in Libya. Zintani Brigades detained Saif al-Islam Gaddafi after his capture in November 2011. One of its leaders, Osama al-Juwali, served as the Libyan defense minister from November 2011 to November 2012. The brigade is currently led by Mukhtar Kalifah Shahub, a former Libyan navy officer. The group has various Arabic-language media outlets. These include a satellite channel called Libya al-Watan and several websites and pages on Facebook.

The Zintan Brigades have been a major part of the conflict since the launch of Operation Dawn against Tripoli International Airport, because they were responsible for its defense.
