= Kikla =

Kikla ككلة
- Town
- Location in Libya
- Coordinates: 32°04′06″N 12°41′40″E
- Country: Libya
- Region: Tripolitania
- District: Jabal al Gharbi
- Elevation: 709 m (2,326 ft)

Population (2006)
  - Total: 10,350
- Time zone: UTC+2 (EET)
- License Plate Code: 53

Kikla (Arabic: ككلة) is a town of approximately 10,000 inhabitants in Libya, most of whom are Berber (Amazigh) descent, and is approximately 150 kilometres south-west of the country's capital, Tripoli. It was also a battleground during the 2011 Nafusa Mountains Campaign of the Libyan Civil War. Kikla is also home to three older cities: Sidi Omer, Zawit Abu Madi and Ijhish. Other towns within Kikla are Likhzour (Arabic: لخزور), Takbal (Arabic: تكبال), Awlad Issa (Arabic: أولاد عيسى), Awlad Omran (Arabic: أولاد عمران), Mzaida (Arabic: المزايدة), Awlad Boziry (Arabic: أولاد بوزيري), Awlad Saeed (Arabic: أولاد سعيد), Awlad Sidi Omar (Arabic: أولاد سيدي عمر) and Amzir (Arabic: أمزير), the later in Berber languages(Tamazight) means waterfall. On 14 June 2011 Kikla was recaptured by the rebels.

== See also ==
- List of cities in Libya
