= Zintan =

City in Libya

Zintan Zintan / الزنتان
- City
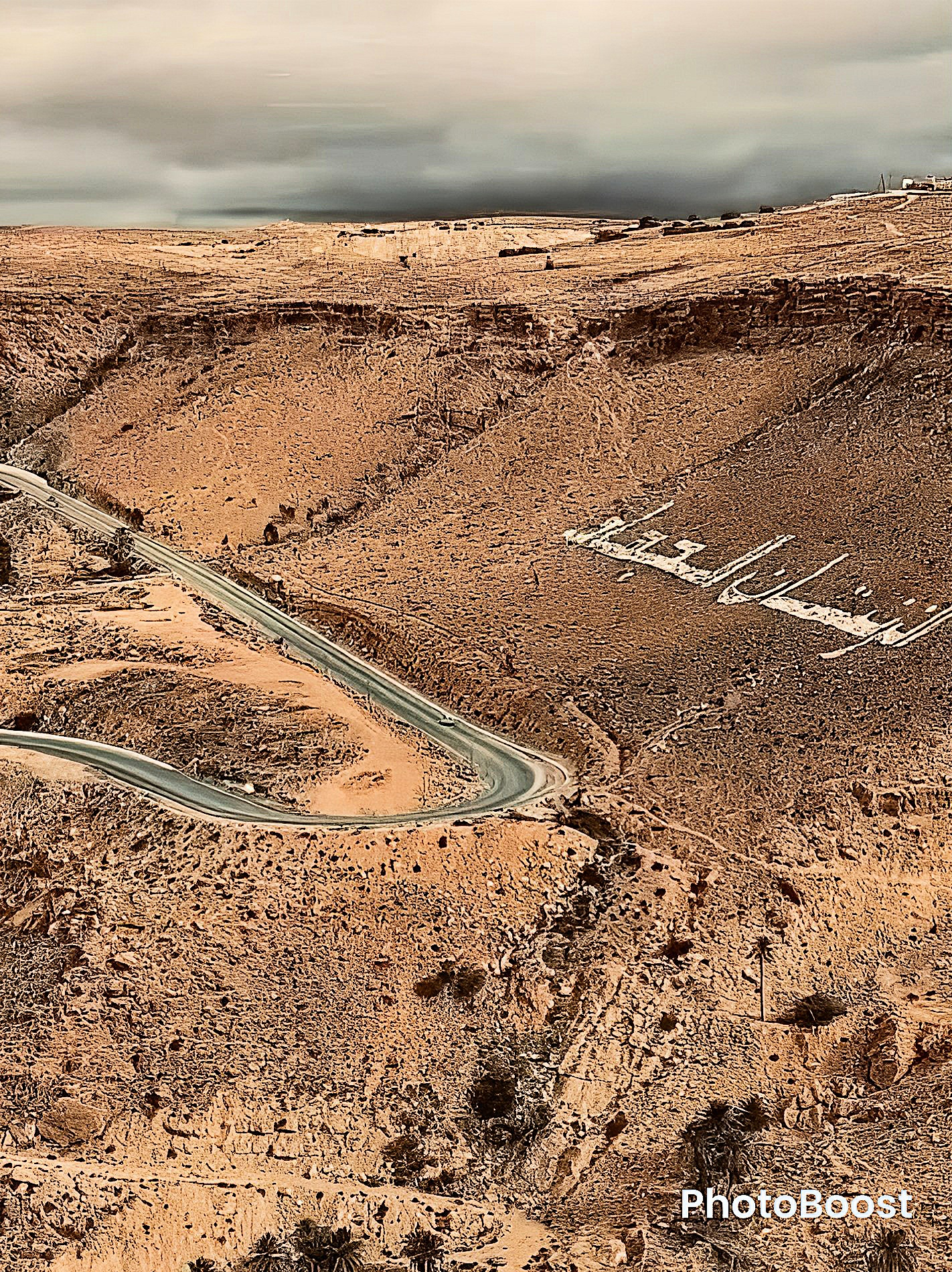

- Location in Libya
- Coordinates: 31°55′50″N 12°14′54″E
- Country: Libya
- Region: Tripolitania
- District: Jabal al Gharbi

Population (2011)
  - Total: 16,024
  - Demonym: Zintani
- Time zone: UTC+2 (EET)
- License Plate Code: 42

Zintan (Arabic: الزنتان, meaning "small castles") is a city in northwestern Libya, situated roughly 136 kilometres (85 mi) southwest of Tripoli, in the Nafusa Mountains area. The city and its surrounding area have a population of 16,024.

== History ==
The Roman garrison town of Tentheos was on the Nafusa mountain range in the hinterland of the Limes Tripolitanus, near the border.

== Civil War activity ==
Groups from Zintan joined in the Libyan Civil War in 2011. The Battle of Zintan reportedly began when the Gaddafi-led government forces arrived to recruit 1,000 soldiers. Insulted by the proposal to fight fellow Libyans, a group formed in Zintan to protest. As the group grew, pro-Gaddafi forces attacked but local groups counterattacked with seized weapons, "rout[ing]" a large, heavily armed government convoy on 19–20 March.

The Zintan people were responsible for the capture of Saif al-Islam, the second son of Muammar Gaddafi. He was captured on 19 November 2011, a month after his father's death, about 50 kilometres (31 mi) west of the town of Ubari near Sabha in southern Libya.

In 2015, during the Second Libyan Civil War, the area was damaged by a series of airstrikes from February to April.

In February 2026, Saif al-Islam Gaddafi, second son of son of Muammar Gaddafi, was assassinated during clashes in Zintan.

== Notable people ==
- Osama al-Juwaili (born 1961), politician
- Saif al-Islam Gaddafi (1972-2026), politician and son of Muammar Gaddafi

== See also ==
- Tripolitania
