= Nafusa Mountains =

Mountains in Libya

Jabal gharbe (Berber languages: الغربي ⵏالجبل) (Arabic: الجبل الغربي) is a mountain range in the western Tripolitania region of northwestern Libya. It also includes the regions around the escarpment formed where the northern end of the Tripolitanian Plateau meets the Mediterranean coastal plain or the Jefara.

== History ==
=== Antiquity ===
The Nafusa Mountains supported agriculture without significant interruption from the pre-Roman period onward. Its rugged terrain, cut through by deep gorges and wadis, made it naturally defensible. The inhabitants managed water resources carefully, constructing wadi walls that enabled the cultivation of olives and grain. The population was originally entirely Berber, settled in nucleated communities rather than dispersed across the landscape, due to the region's water scarcity.

During the Roman imperial period, the Nafusa Mountains contained a number of agricultural settlements and fortified farms. The remains of mausolea (such as Henscir Suffit and Henscir al-Ausaf) and necropolises are also still visible today. Especially characteristic to this period are ashlar masonry structures, sculptural decoration on funerary monuments, and cisterns that Francesco Corò, who described the area in the 1920s, attributed to Roman agricultural activity. Roman period sites are distributed across the entire length of the Nafusa Mountains rather than being confined to its eastern portion alone. The road network remains poorly understood, as no milestones have been recovered within the mountain area itself, though milestones attesting to roads toward the pre-desert have been found south of Zintan. Latin inscriptions are rare, and have not been found further west than Qasr el-Gezira within the Jabal proper.

Evidence for Christian (including Byzantine) occupation of the region is sparse. Several church sites have been identified, including those at el-Asabaa, Wadi Crema, Henscir Taglissi near Msuffin, and Giuma Rumi Cur. A limestone block bearing a chi-rho monogram, recovered from Tarmisa, is now held in the Museum of Libya in the capital, Tripoli. The extent of Byzantine-period settlement remains difficult to assess given the limited archaeological work conducted in the region. It remains uncertain whether the Christian community attested in the coastal area of Tripolitania, active at least until the 11th century, had a parallel presence in the mountain interior. In later periods, columns, capitals, and ashlar blocks from the Roman and Byzantine periods were reused as spolia in mosque arcades and walls across a wide geographic range, from Nalut in the west to the environs of Jadu in the east.

=== Ibadi imamate ===
In the aftermath of the great Berber Revolt of the 8th century, Ibadi missionaries that had fled from the Umayyad Caliphate took refuge in the Nafusa Mountains. Preachers converted and organized the native Nafusa people into a fighting force. Under the leadership of Imam Abu al-Khattab al-Ma'afari, the Nafusa descended from the mountains and proceeded to conquer all of the crumbling Fihrid emirate of Ifriqiya - capturing Tripoli in 757 and Kairouan in 758. But the Abbasid Arab governor of Egypt invaded Ifriqya, defeated the Nafusa in a battle at Tawergha in 761 (his third attempt - his first two armies had been repulsed) and put an end to their putative new state. However, the Nafusa mountains themselves remained unconquered. Throughout the 9th century, while the Aghlabids ruled in Ifriqiya, the Ibadi maintained an independent puritan republic in the Nafusa mountains. The Imamate of Nafusa was in close alliance with the other Ibadi remnant, the Rustamid dynasty in Tiaret, both constant thorns on either side of the Aghlabids, in communication with each other across the back highlands of North Africa.

In 879, the Tulunids of Egypt invaded Aghlabid Ifriqya and captured Tripoli. But the Nafusa challenged and destroyed the Egyptian army in 880. Again the Nafusa victory was short-lived. In 896-97, the Aghlabid emir Ibrahim II of Ifriqiya recovered Tripolitana and defeated the Nafusa in a great battle at Manu (south of Gabès). In the aftermath, citing them as heretics, Ibrahim II executed all the Nafusa prisoners and put an end to their independent imamate (Tahert fell shortly after, in 911). Despite the destruction of their states, Ibadi Islam remained a strong (if clandestine) faith among the Berbers of the Nafusa mountains for centuries after, down to the modern day. The lingering heterodoxy of the Nafusa people has placed them frequently at odds, or under suspicion, by the largely orthodox Sunni population of the rest of Libya.

=== 2011 Libyan civil war ===
This distinct culture, suppressed and oppressed by the Libyan regime, has risen to new prominence in the course of the Libyan Civil War (2011), when their initiatives led to the Nafusa Mountains becoming a major front in that war. The terrain and topography of the region are critical strategic factors, constraining mechanised advances from the flat plain and plateau, and favouring guerrilla tactics based on close local knowledge and the advantage of high ground. By the end of June 2011 the Nafusi people had almost succeeded in liberating themselves completely from the control of the regime.

== Geography ==
The Nafusa Mountains form the boundary between the Libyan coastal plain, known as the Jafara, to the north, and the Tripolitanian Plateau to the south. The beds (strata) of the Tripolitanian Plateau slope downwards to the south and tilt upwards towards the north creating the highest portion of the plateau as the Nafusa mountains which rise to over 750 m (2,500 ft). The plateau ends abruptly on the north with an escarpment which has up to 350 m (1,100 ft) of topographic prominence. A series of deep valleys which drain north toward the Jefara cut into this escarpment. It extends about 250 km (160 mi) within Libya, from just east of the city of Gharyan (about 60 km (40 mi) south of Tripoli) in the east to the city of Wazzin at the Tunisian border in the west. Spurs and isolated upthrusts continue into Tunisia, but this region is almost unpopulated, in marked contrast to the situation in Libya.

The mountain area is rarely more than 25 km (16 mi) in depth, from its southern boundary, the flat arid plateau some 650 m (2,100 ft) above sea level, to its northern limit on the plain, where the land falls to below 150 m (490 ft). Much of the 500 m (2,000 ft) drop in level is accomplished abruptly, at the escarpment, where local topographic prominences may be up to 350 m (1,100 ft). It is from below, on the plain, viewing the steep slopes and sharply-etched skyline that the area appears mountainous; from the plateau the land appears merely hilly, and in fact it is rather flat apart from the effects of differential erosion.

Towns in the mountains include Gharyan, Yafran, Zintan, Qotros, Jadu, Kabaw, Al-Qawalish and Nalut, which have all been the sites of military action during the 2011 civil war. Since 2007, the mountains stretch across two districts: Jabal al Gharbi District and Nalut District.

== Economy ==
The mountain villages raise primarily goats, olives and grain, but also have fig and apricot orchards.

Ethic composition of the Libyan population in 1974. The orange arc in the Northwest shows the Berber population in the Nafusa Mountains.

== 2011 Libyan civil war ==
The Nafusa Mountains became first a hotbed for anti-Gaddafi protests (with protests breaking out relatively early in Nalut and Zintan) and then a rebel stronghold, an island of rebel control in the mainly Gaddafi-controlled western part of the country. During the early stages, forces allied to the national transitional government succeeded in evacuating most non-combatants into Tunisia; the Wazzin border crossing was captured and held to ensure supply lines from Tunisia; all the mountain towns were retaken; and the front extended to the plains, cutting regime communications lines and allowing electricity to be restored. They were the first rebel combatants to be supplied with arms by air-drop.

In the course of the civil war, many towns in the area were subjected to shelling by artillery and rockets from both sides, with much damage to infrastructure. Regime forces cut off electricity and water supplies. Médecins Sans Frontières sent a team in Zintan to help the large number of wounded. Al Galaa was without electricity and water for seven weeks, and more than 45,000 refugees fled for safety to the adjoining Tunisian region of Tatouine, where many had relatives.

=== Cultural renaissance ===
As towns and villages in the Nafusa Mountains and surrounding areas were liberated from control by forces loyal to Muammar Gaddafi in early summer 2011, and while fierce fighting continued, Berber exhibitions and workshops sprang up to share and spread the Tamazight culture and language, after four decades during which there were severe punishments for speaking and writing Tamazight openly.

== See also ==
- Cave dwelling Jews
