= Mizda District =

Former district of Libya

Coordinates: 31°26′N 12°59′E

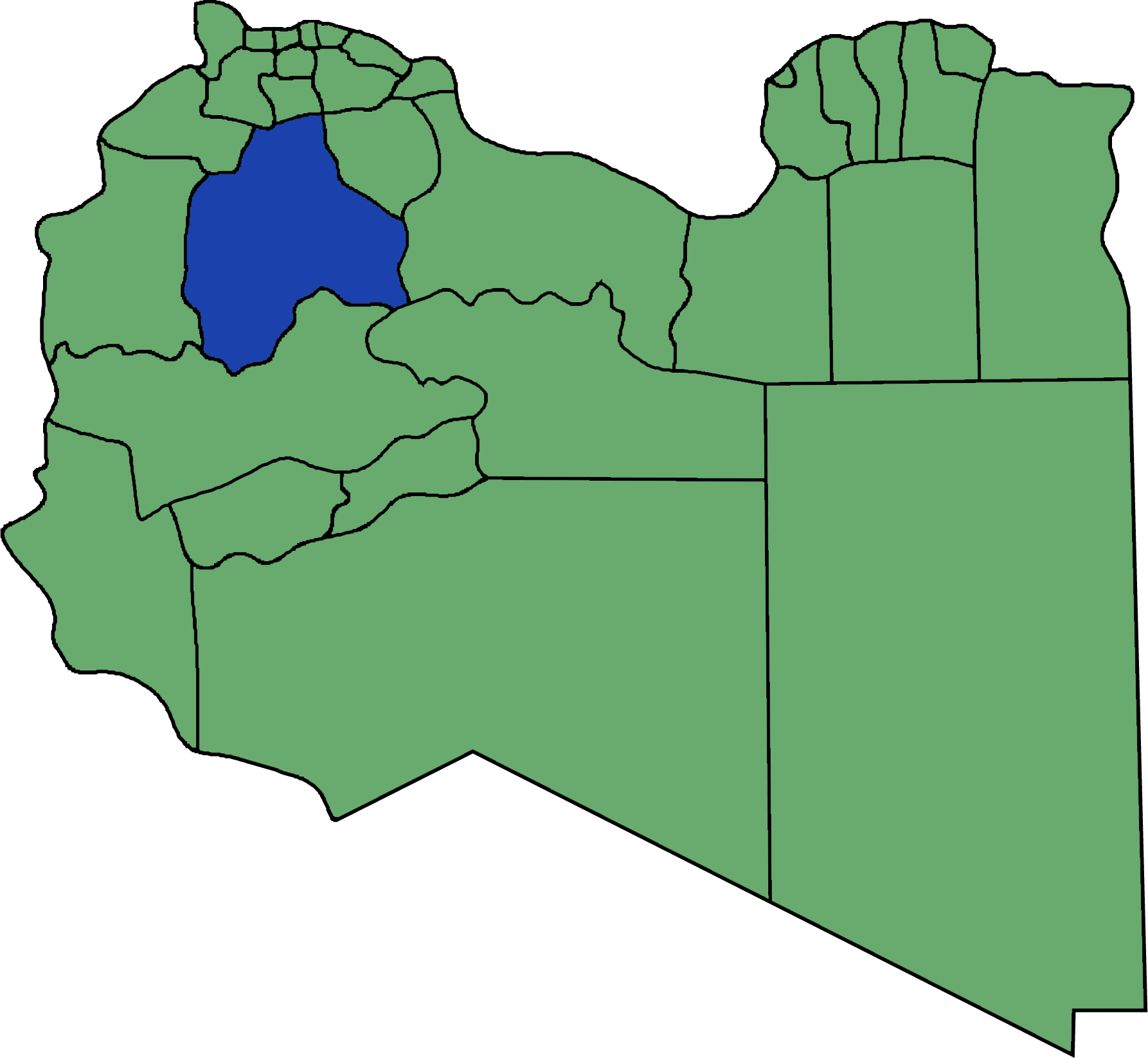

Mizda was one of the districts of Libya. In the 2007 reorganization of Libyan districts its territory became part of Jabal al Gharbi District.

Prior to 2007 Mizdah bordered the following districts:

- Bani Walid - northeast
- Sirte - east
- Al Jufrah - southeast
- Wadi Al Shatii - south
- Ghadames - west
- Nalut - northwest, south of Yafran
- Yafran - northwest, north of Nalut
- Gharyan - north
- Tarhuna wa Msalata - northeast, at a quadripoint

At the time Mizda bordered more districts than any other Libyan district.

== Settlements ==
The following are important settlements in the former Mizda District:

- Mizda (مزدة) a town at 31° 25' 20"N 12° 57' 0"E
- Nasmah (-نسمة) a village at 31° 23' 0 N 13° 17' 0 E
- Bi'r Abu al Ghurab or Abu West (أبو الغرب) a village at 30° 38' 0 N 13° 36' 0 E
- Al Qaryah al Gharbīyah (القرية الغربية) at 30° 24' 24" N 13° 25' 14" E
- Tabaqa (طبقة) at 30° 25' 53" N 13° 19' 7" E
- Ash Shuwayrif or Esc Sciuere (الشويرف) at 29° 59' 20" N 14° 15' 20" E
- Fessano or Fisānū (فسانو) also Fessano Almchachep (منطقة فسانو) or Sawani Fassanu at 31° 18' 19" N 12° 47' 42" E
- Qaryat (القرية الشرقية) at 30° 23' 17" N 13° 34' 50" E
- Ash Shaqiqa (الشقيقة) a village at 31° 38' 22" N 12° 48' 24" E
