= Kabaw =

Kabaw كاباو Kabao, Cabao
- Town
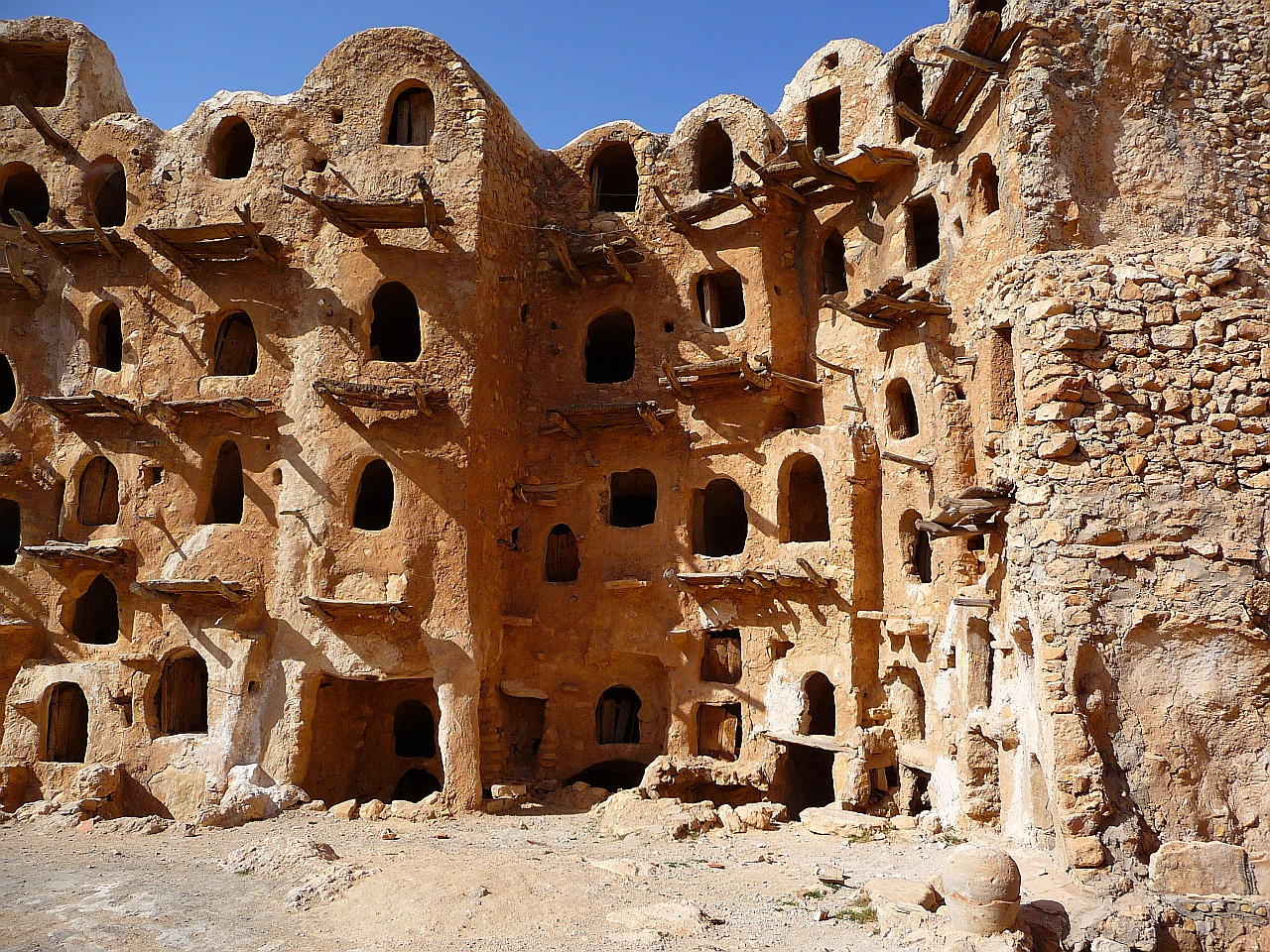
- Near Kabaw

- Location in Libya
- Coordinates: 31°50′40″N 11°20′23″E
- Country: Libya
- Region: Tripolitania
- District: Nalut
- Elevation: 2,110 ft (643 m)
- Time zone: UTC+2 (EET)
- License Plate Code: 48

Kabaw, Kabao or Cabao (Arabic: كاباو) is a town in the Nalut District in northwestern Libya. It lies just 9 kilometres (6 mi) off the Gharyan–Nalut road and about 70 kilometres (43 mi) west of Jadu, on the northern edge of the Tripolitanian Plateau in the Nafusa Mountains.

== History ==
Historically, Kabaw was a Berber town in the Ghadames administrative area. After World War II, it was occupied by the French military and governed from Tunisia. Kabaw is one of the many towns in the Jebel Nafusa region that has been inhabited by the Amazigh (Berbers) for thousands of years. The town has played a key role in preserving Amazigh language, traditions, and architecture, even as various foreign powers ruled over Libya.

Ottoman and Italian Rule

During the Ottoman period (1551–1911), Kabaw—like many other Nafusa towns—was part of the broader administration of Tripolitania. It was known for its defensive fortifications and unique communal granaries. Under Italian colonization (1911–1943), Kabaw and other Amazigh towns resisted Italian rule, with many locals participating in uprisings alongside Libyan nationalists like Omar Mukhtar. It was returned to Libyan control in 1951.

== Attractions ==
Kabaw is home to the ghurfas or "Ksar Kabaw" a Berber hilltop village-fort, now abandoned. The ghurfas is built mainly of rock, gypsum and adobe, with doors made of palm wood.

The Spring Qsar Festival is held in April almost every year.
