= Ksar Nalut =

Coordinates: 31.8680°N 10.9855°E

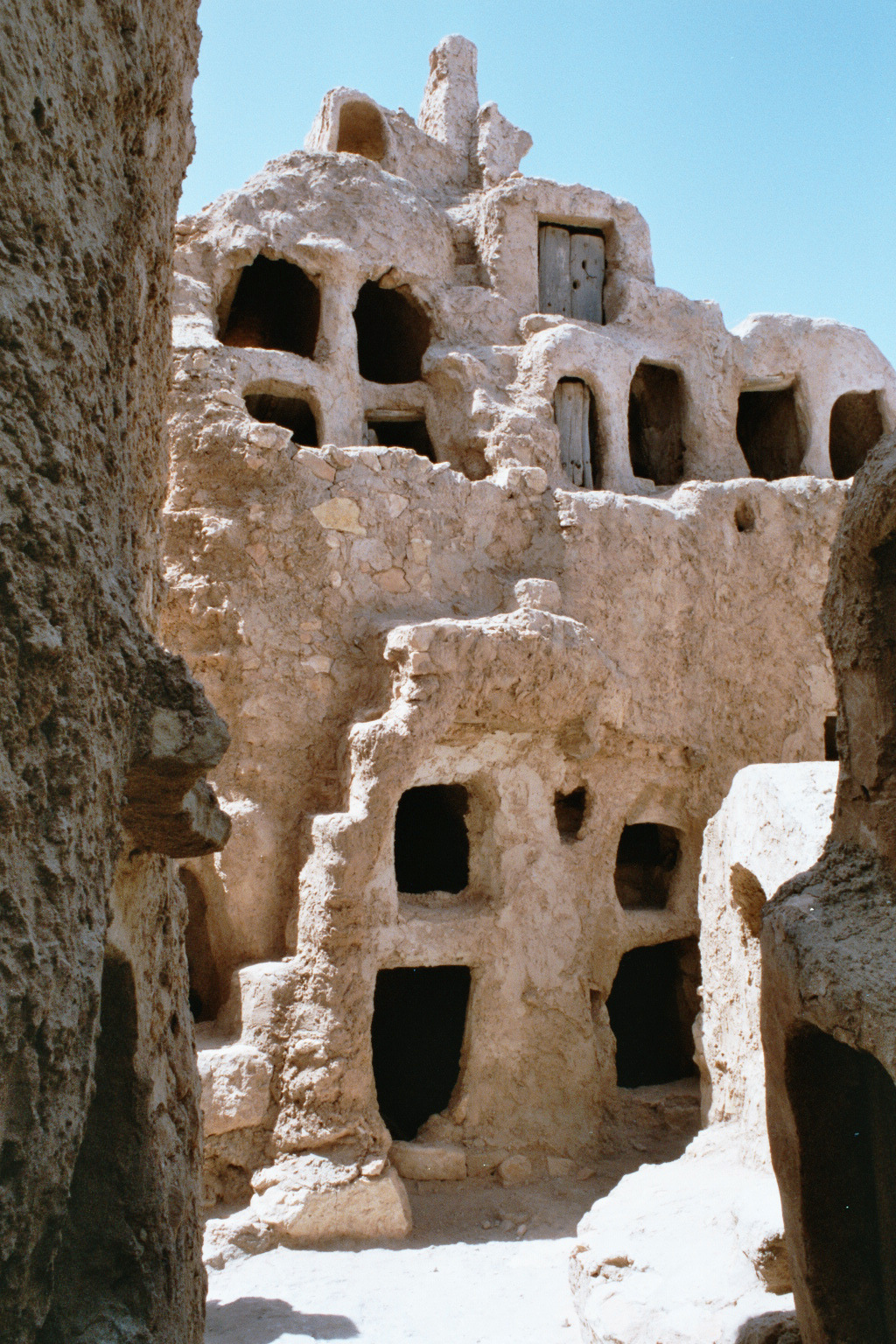
Ksar Nalut in Libya

Ksar Nalut (Arabic: قصر نالوت, in Berber: aɣrem Nalut or aghrem Nalut) or Ksar Lalot is a fortified ksar (granary), in Nalut, Nalut District, Western Libya. Like other ksars created by North African Berber communities, it is located on a hilltop to help protect it from raiding parties.

The Nalut Kasr, constructed in the 11th century and abandoned since the 1960s, is a tourist destination.
