= Tandemira =

Tandemira تندميرة
- Town
- Country: Libya
- Region: Tripolitania
- Time zone: UTC+2
- License Plate Code: 24

Tandemira (Arabic: تندميرة) is a small village located on the Nafusa Mountain in Libya, situated between the regions of Kabaw and Al-Haraba. It is bordered by Al-Haraba to the east and Kabaw and Tamzin to the west. Tandemira has a population of approximately 5,000 people, with most of them engaged in agriculture, sheep farming, and trade.

The village features several mosques, the most notable of which are: Abu Mansour Elias Mosque, Abu Qashqash Mosque, Sheikh Omar Bin Issa Al-Tandimarti Mosque, and Abu Nasr Mosque, which is located right on the edge of the mountain, overlooking the Tiji area.
