= Al Fejeij =

Al Fejeij الفجيج Al Fjeij
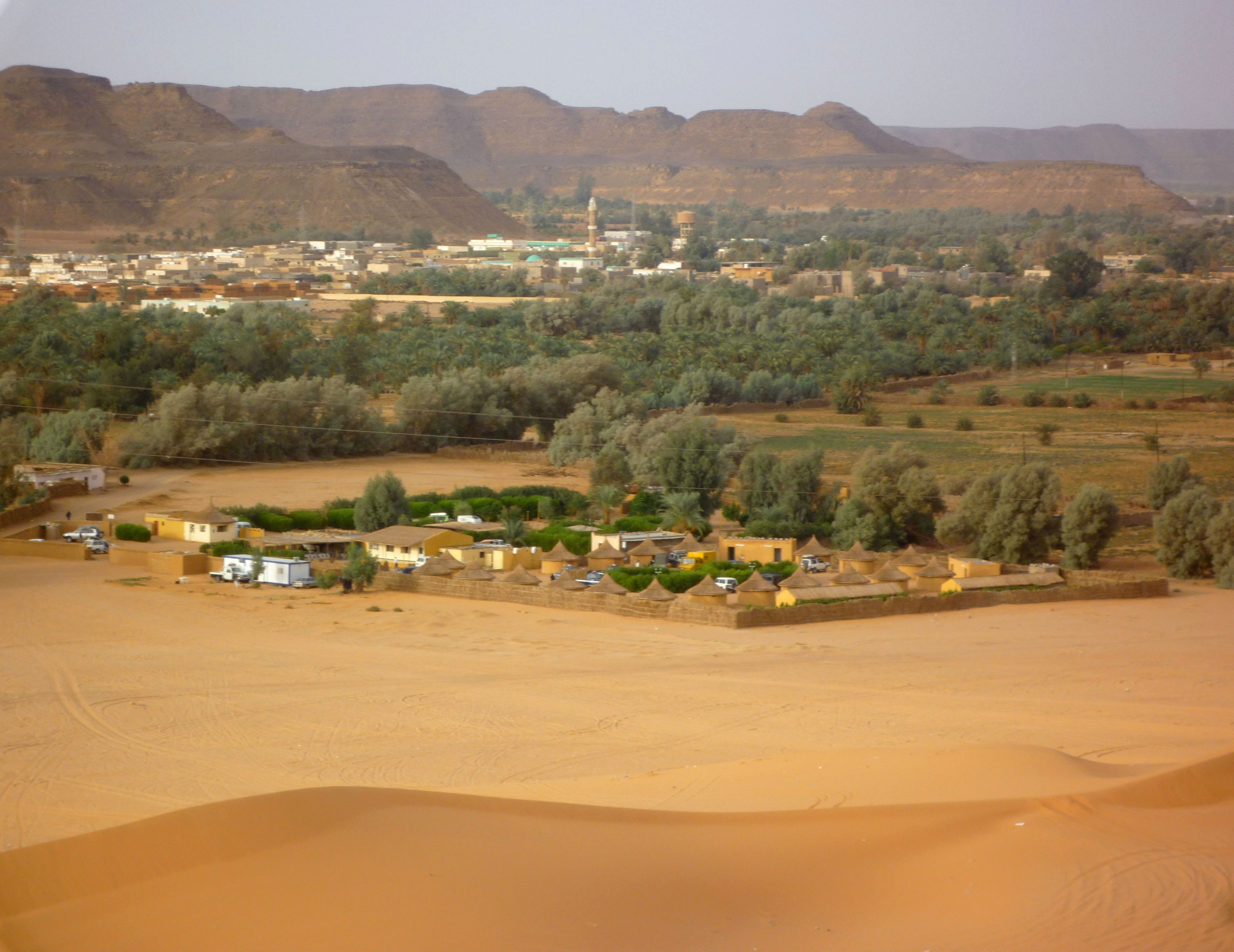

- Location in Libya
- Coordinates: 26°33′00″N 13°13′59″E
- Country: Libya
- Region: Fezzan
- District: Wadi al Hayaa

Population (2006)
  - Total: 3,367
- Time zone: UTC + 2

Al Fejeij, or Al Fjeij is an oasis in southwestern Libya. It is located 52 km (32 mi) east of Ubari, on the crossroads between Sabha-Ubari road, and the south road to Tesawa, and Murzuk.
