= El Msufiin =

Village in Tripolitania, Libya

Coordinates: 32°03′N 12°59′E

El Musfiin أمسوفين El Musfiin, Emssoffeen
- City
- Location in Libya
- Country: Libya
- Region: Tripolitania
- District: Jabal al Gharbi

El Musfiin or Emssoffeen (Arabic: أمسوفين) is a locality in the Jabal al Gharbi District of Libya, located in the Nafusa Mountains.

== Geography ==
El Musfiin is located on a hilltop.

== Archaeology ==
About 500 meters southwest of el-Msufiin lies the ruin of Henscir Taglissi, on the right bank of the Wadi en-Nzasat. This is the original findspot of the late-antique Christian inscriptions known as IRT 863. First recorded in 1773, when some blocks were still in situ, additional fragments were recovered in the 20th century through survey and limited excavation. The material consists of multiple inscribed stone blocks bearing Christian texts, including short invocations and praises to God, likely forming a continuous decorative program on a building, including lintels marked with the Chi-Rho monogram, in some cases flanked by Alpha and Omega; many were later lost or displaced, and one was reused in the outer wall of a small mosque at el-Msufiin.
