= Zaltan =

Town in Nuqat al Khams, Libya

Zaltan زلطن Zelten
- Town
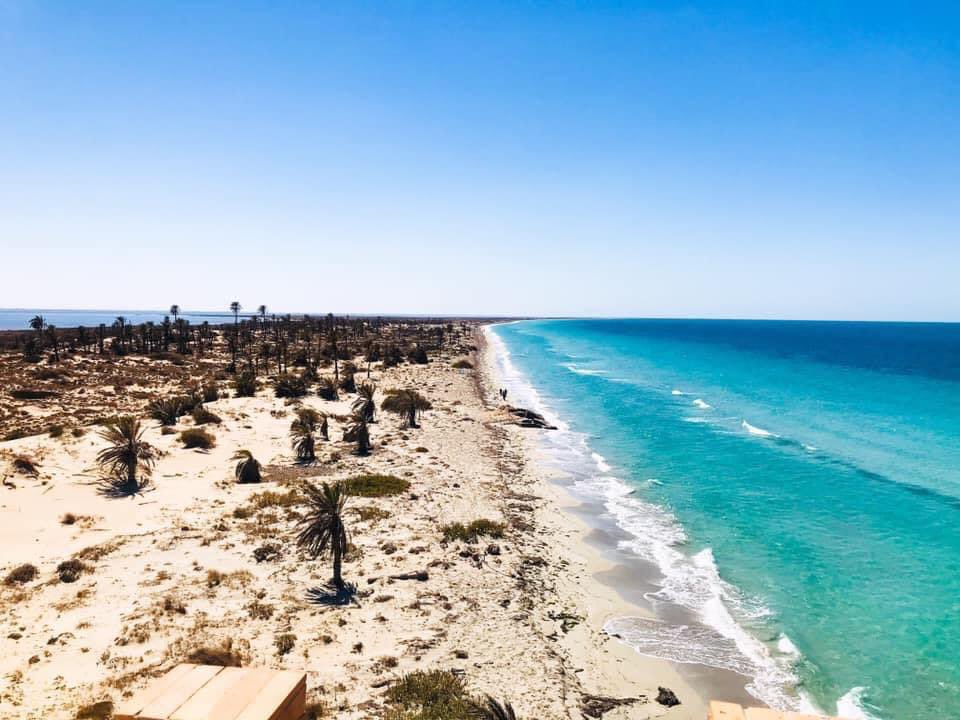

- Location in Libya
- Coordinates: 32°57′00″N 11°51′57″E
- Country: Libya
- District: Nuqat al Khams
- Elevation: 4 m (13 ft)

Population (2009)
  - Total: 17,700
- Time zone: UTC+2 (EET)
- License Plate Code: 61

Zaltan or Zelten (Arabic: زلطن) is a town in the district of Nuqat al Khams of northwestern Libya. The town, which has a population of around 17,700 (2009), is on the Mediterranean coast. It is located around 140 kilometres (87 mi) west of Tripoli.

== History ==
The town has been in existence at least since Roman times. Archaeological excavations have uncovered parts of the old town as well as Roman olive presses.

== Economy ==
The surrounding area is used primarily in dryland farming with barley, wheat, olives, dates, citrus fruits, figs, and grapes grown for export. There is a secondary trade in livestock, primarily sheep, goats and camels, brought in from outlying communities. Salt has been collected in pans since Roman times. Zaltan's proximity to the Tunisian border has made Zaltan a regional center for trade. Olive and palm oil are produced locally.

== Culture ==
There is a small museum in Zaltan displaying some of the local archaeological finds. An annual poetry festival is also held in the town.

== See also ==
- List of cities in Libya
