= Hagiara =

- Town
- Location in Libya
- Coordinates: 27°01′0.0012″N 14°28′6.0″E
- Country: Libya
- Region: Fezzan
- District: Sabha
- Elevation: 1,404 ft (428 m)
- Time zone: UTC+2 (EET)

Hagiara (Arabic: الحجارة) is a Saharan desert oasis town in the Fezzan region of southwest Libya. Geographically it is located at the Sabha District, and is roughly 3.8 km south-east of the district's capital, Sabha.

== See also ==
- List of cities in Libya
