= Tabaqah =

Tabaqah or Tabqa may refer to:

- Tabqa, a city in Syria near the Tabqa Dam
- Tabqa Dam, a dam on the Euphrates River near Tabqa
- At-Tabaqa, a Palestinian village near Hebron
- Tabaqa, Jordan, an archeological site; see Natufian culture
- Tabaqa, Libya, a town in western Libya
- Tabaqah, Oman, a settlement in Oman
- Tabaqat Fahl/Fahil, Jordan, a village next to the archeological site of the ancient city of Pella

== See also ==
- Tabgha, an area situated on the north-western shore of the Sea of Galilee in Israel
