= Nasmah =

Nasmah is a settlement located in the Jabal al Gharbi district of Libya (following the 2007 administrative reorganization that incorporated the former Mizda district). Situated at an approximate elevation of 336 meters above the sea level, the local area is traditionally inhabited by members of Awlad Abu Seif tribe.

31°23′N 13°17′E
