= Ghadames District =

Former district of Libya

Coordinates: 30°08′N 9°30′E

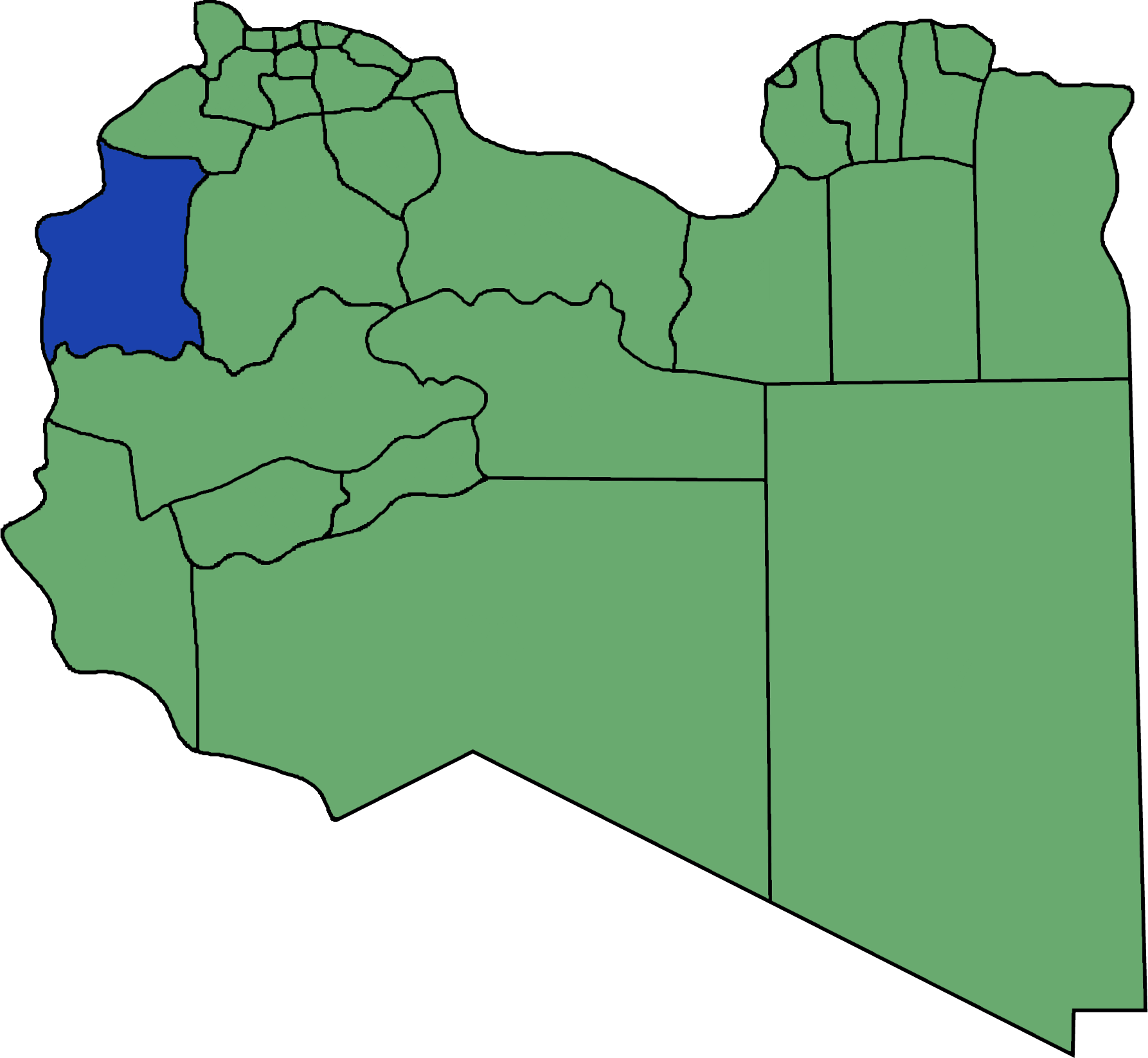

Ghadames or Ghadamis (Arabic: غدامس, Libyan vernacular: ġdāməs) was a district of Libya until 2007. Its territory is now part of Nalut District. It was in the northwest of the country with its capital at Ghadames.

To the west, Ghadamis bordered the following regions of Tunisia and Algeria:

- Tataouine Governorate, Tunisia - north
- Ouargla Province, Algeria - northwest
- Illizi Province, Algeria - west

Domestically, it bordered the following districts:

- Nalut - northeast
- Mizda - east
- Wadi Al Shatii - south
