= Umm al Ahrar =

Umm al Ahrar Umm al Aḩrār
- Town
- Location in Libya
- Coordinates: 27°31′0.01″N 15°00′00″E
- Country: Libya
- Region: Fezzan
- District: Sabha
- Elevation: 1,210 ft (370 m)
- Time zone: UTC+2 (EET)

Umm al Ahrar or Umm al Aḩrār (Arabic: أم الأحرار) is a Saharan desert oasis town in the Fezzan region of southwest Libya.

== See also ==
- List of cities in Libya
