= Mizda =

Mizda مزدة
- Town
- Location in Libya
- Coordinates: 31°26′42″N 12°58′59″E
- Country: Libya
- Region: Tripolitania
- District: Jabal al Gharbi
- Elevation: 454 m (1,490 ft)

Population (2011)
  - Total: 23,216
- Time zone: UTC+2 (EET)
- License Plate Code: 38

Mizda or Mesdah (Tamazight: ⵎⵉⵣⴷⴰ, Mizda) is a town in the Nafusa Mountains in Libya. It was the capital of the former Mizda District.

Just to the west of Mizda is the Mizda Army Base at 31°25′29″N 12°56′54″E

The Berber tribe Awlad Abu Say is centered around Mizda and Gharyan to the north.

== See also ==
- List of cities in Libya
