= Sabha District =

District of Libya

Coordinates: 27°02′N 14°26′E

Sabha سبها
- District
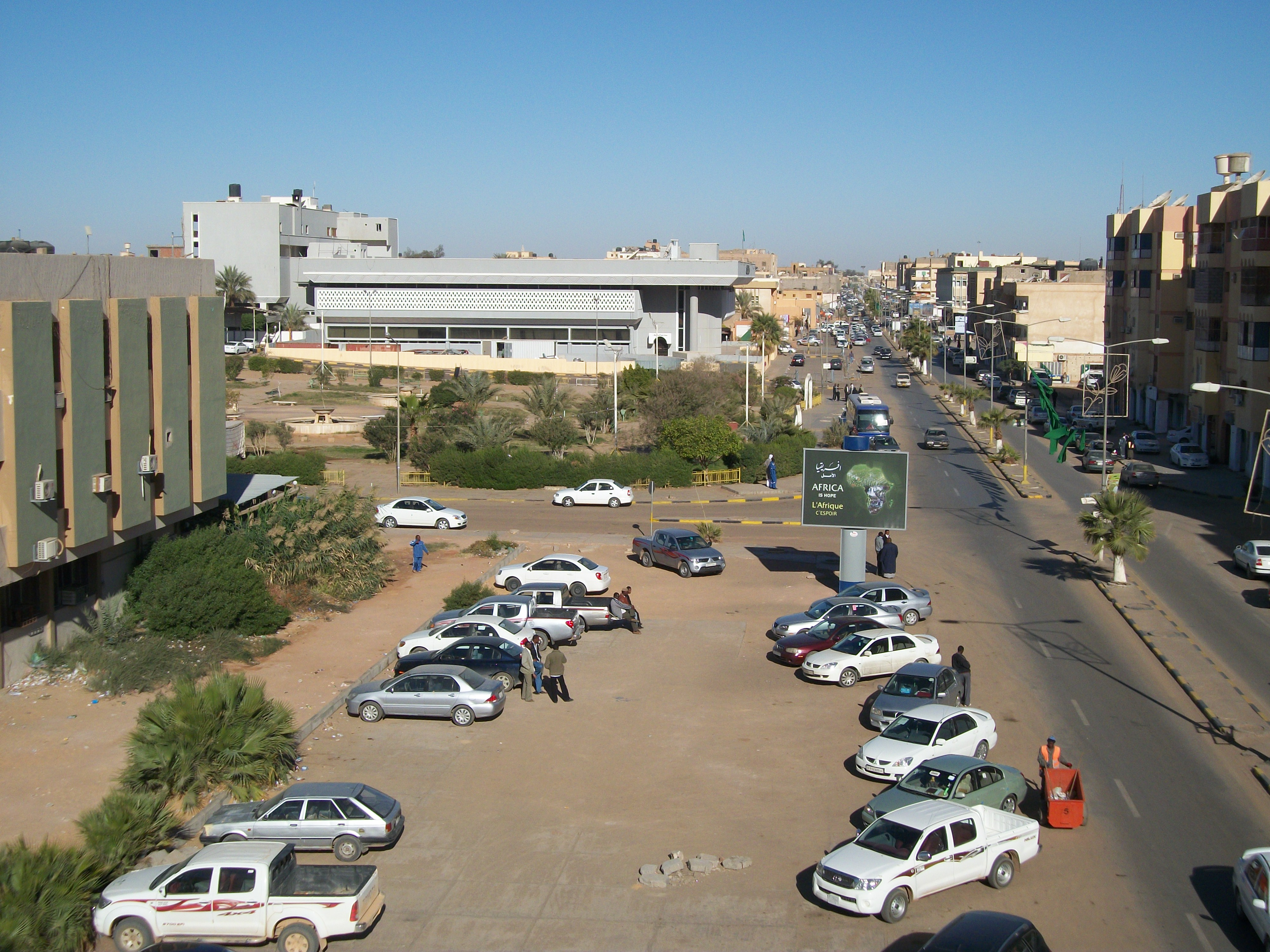

- Map of Libya with Sabha district highlighted
- Country: Libya
- Capital: Sabha

Area
  - Total: 15,330 km^{2} (5,920 sq mi)

Population (2006)
  - Total: 134,162
  - Density: 8.752/km^{2} (22.67/sq mi)
- License Plate Code: 1

Sabha (Arabic: سبها Sabhā) is one of the districts of Libya, situated near the center of the country in the Fezzan region. The city of Sabha serves as its capital. The district shares borders with the following districts: Wadi Al Shatii to the north, Al Jufrah to the east, Murzuq to the south, and Wadi Al Hayaa to the west.

As per the 2012 census, the total population in the region was 157,747, with an average household size of 6.9. The district had a total of 22,713 households, of which 20,907 were Libyan households. The population density of the district was 1.86 persons per square kilometer.

== Geography ==
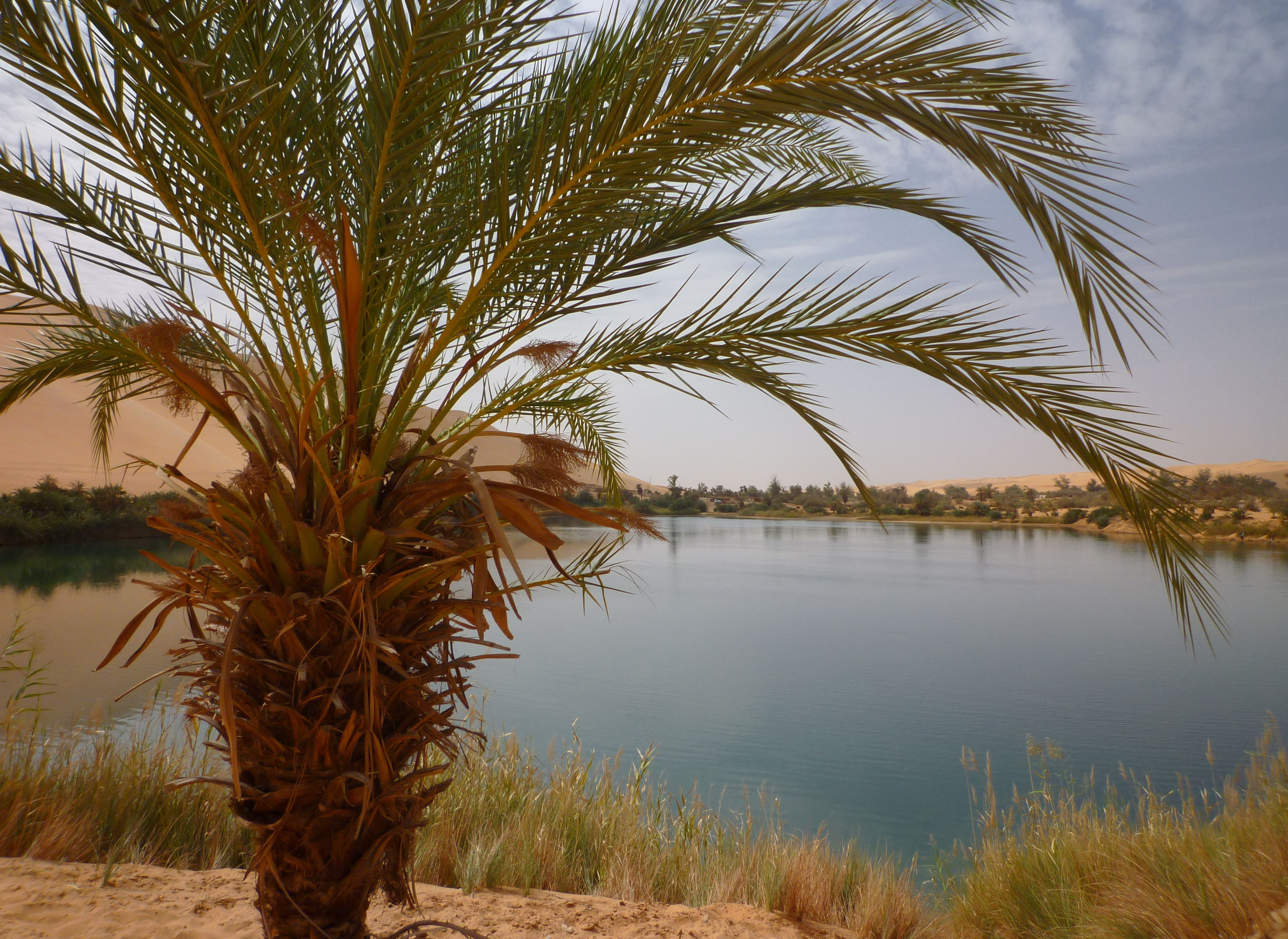
The Gaberoun oasis, in Sabha District.

Sabha District borders the districts of Wadi Al Shatii in the north, Al Jufrah in the east, Murzuq in the south and Wadi Al Hayaa in the west. Sabha District is in the Fezzen region (Libyan Desert), a section of the Sahara Desert. The Sabha Air Base is in the district. The Gaberoun oasis, on a spring-fed lake, is a popular tourist attraction in the district. Libya has mostly a flat undulating plain and occasional plateau, with an average elevation of around 423 m (1,388 ft). Around 91 per cent of the land is covered by desert, with only 8.8 per cent agricultural land (with only 1% arable lands) and 0.1 per cent of forests. The climate is desert in most parts of the district. Dust storms lasting four to eight days is pretty common during Spring. Triplotania is the northwest region, while it is Cyrenacia in the east and Fezzen in southwest. Fezzen is mostly full of deserts. The region receives an annual rainfall of 2.5 in (64 mm). There are no perennial rivers in the region, but the region is abundant with groundwater aquifers.

== Demographics ==
Per the census of 2012, the total population in the region was 157,747 with 150,353 Libyans. The average size of the household in the country was 6.9, while the average household size of non-Libyans being 3.7. There were totally 22,713 households in the district, with 20,907 Libyan ones. The population density of the district was 1.86 persons per sq. km. Per 2006 census, there were totally 43,010 economically active people in the district. There were 18,172 government employees, 5,114 employers, 16,974 first level workers and 001-second level workers. There were 8,114 workers in state administration, 6,733 in agriculture, animal husbandry and forestry, 7,341 in agriculture & hunting, 7,931 in education, 3,840 in private enterprises, 1,340 in health & social work, 2,277 in production, 8,395 in technical work and 905 service workers. The total enrollment in schools was 45,581 and the number of people above secondary stage and less than graduation was 2,529. As per the report from World Health Organization (WHO), there were one communicable disease centres, 12 dental clinics, one general clinics, four in-patient clinics, seven out-patient clinics, 57 pharmacies, 25 PHC centres and one polyclinic.

== Politics ==
The major settlements of Sabha District include Sabha, Samnu, Tamanhant, Umm al `Abid, Umm al Ahrar and Al Mahdia. Libya became independent in 1951 from the colonial empire and generally known for its oil rich resources. As a part of decentralization in 2012, the country is administratively split into 13 regions from the original 25 municipalities, which were further divided in 1,500 communes. As of 2016, there were 22 administrative divisions in the country in the form of districts. In the Libyan Civil War, Gaddafi forces maintained control of large parts of the district and city longer than elsewhere in the country. The National Transitional Council took control of the city on 11 September 2011.
