= Gaberoun =

Oasis in Libya

- قبر عون (Arabic); Lago Gaberoun (Italian)
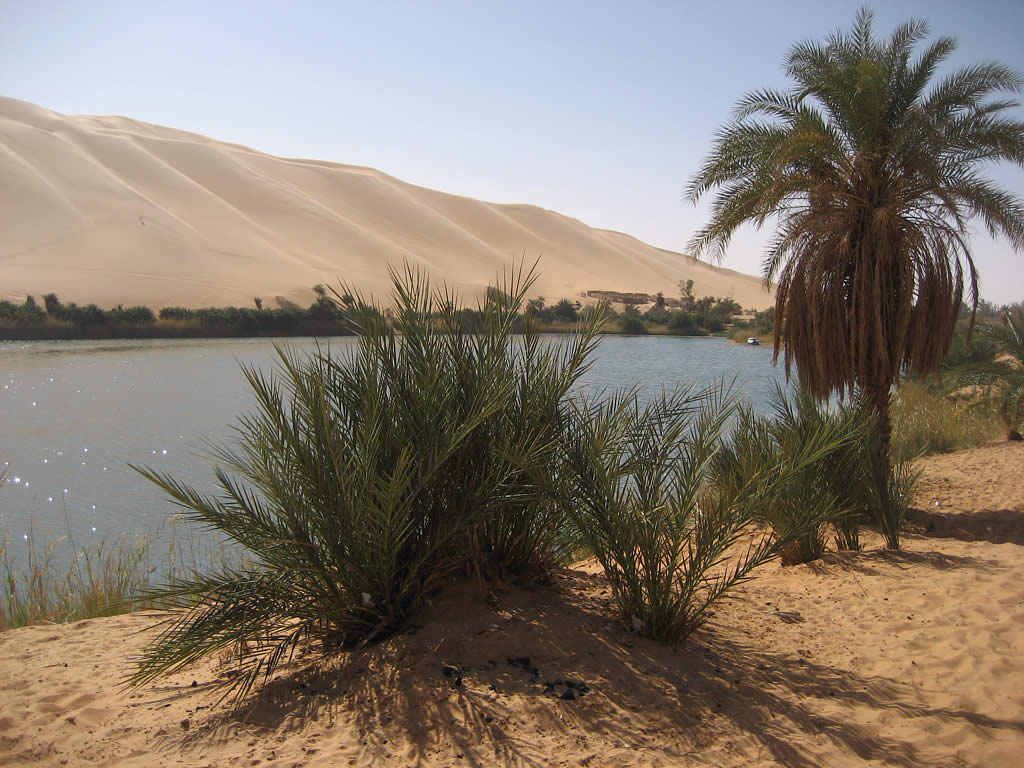
- Gaberoun Salted Lake

- Location within Libya
- Interactive map of Gaberoun
- Location: Wadi al Hayaa District, Fezzan
- Coordinates: 26°48′11″N 13°32′7″E
- Basin countries: Libya
- Max. depth: 7.5 metres (25 ft)

Gaberoun (Arabic: قبر عون; Italian: Lago Gaberoun, alternate spelling Gaber Awhn, Gabr Awhn, Gabr Own, Gabraun) is an oasis with a large lake in the Idehan Ubari desert region of the Libyan Sahara. Administratively, it is located Wadi al Hayaa District of the Fezzan region in southwestern Libya. A rudimentary tourist camp is located on the northeastern shore, including an open patio, sleeping huts, and a souvenir shop (attended by a Tuareg in full costume) in the winter. The lake is very salty; swimming can be pleasant despite the salt water crustaceans. Mosquitoes are abundant, especially in the summer. October to May is considered the best time to visit as the climate is milder.

== History ==
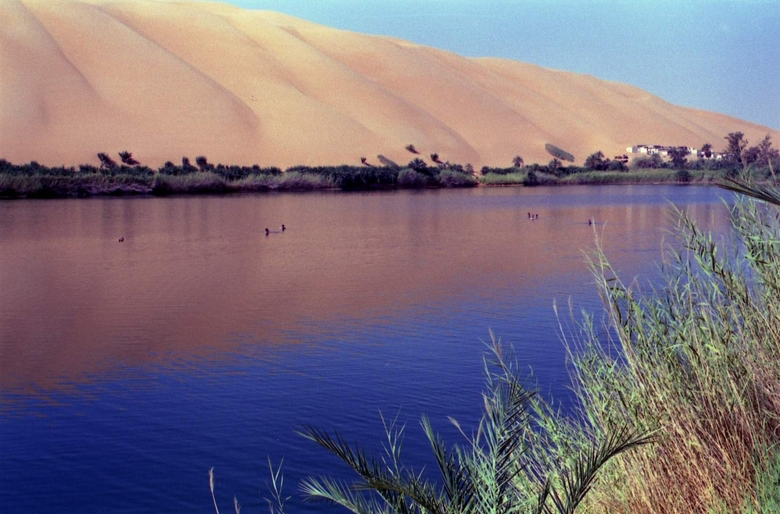
Gaberoun Oasis, the lake and sand dunes.

A small tribe inhabited the oasis; the ruins of their settlement are scattered between the palms at the north-western shore of the lake. It is said that one of their sources of subsistence was the worm-like crustaceans they fished from the salty lake. They were moved in the 1980s to a new location outside the sand dunes, in the Wadi Bashir, south of the erg, a settlement of concrete apartments built specifically for the resettlement of this tribe.

The old Bedouin settlement by the western shore of the lake has been abandoned, and now lies in ruins.

== Access ==
The oasis is accessible from the Sabha-Ubari road (150km west of Sabha and north in the sand dunes at the settlement of Qasr Larocu), by a 36 km 4WD ride through the dunes of the Ubari sand sea (also called Ramlat al Dauada).

== Nearby attractions ==
Other nearby attractions are the El Mandara oasis (26.68972°N 13.31260°E), the Un Almaa oasis (26.70973°N 13.33208°E), Mafo Lake in the same sand erg (Ramlat al Dauada) and the museum in Germa.

== Games ==
The second mission from the game Sniper Elite III takes place on the Gaberoun oasis.

== See also ==
- Phoenix dactylifera - native oasis date palm
