= Nalut Dinosaur Museum =

- Location: Nalut, Libya
- Coordinates: 31.864842°N 10.982509°E
- Type: paleontological museum

The Nalut Dinosaur Museum is a paleontological museum located in Nalut, Libya. The fossils, which date from the Cretaceous period, were discovered by a joint expedition of Libyan geologists and American paleontologists. The collection is housed in a wing of the Red Crescent building in Nalut.

== See also ==
- List of museums in Libya
