= Asbi'a =

asbi’a السبيعة / اسبيعة
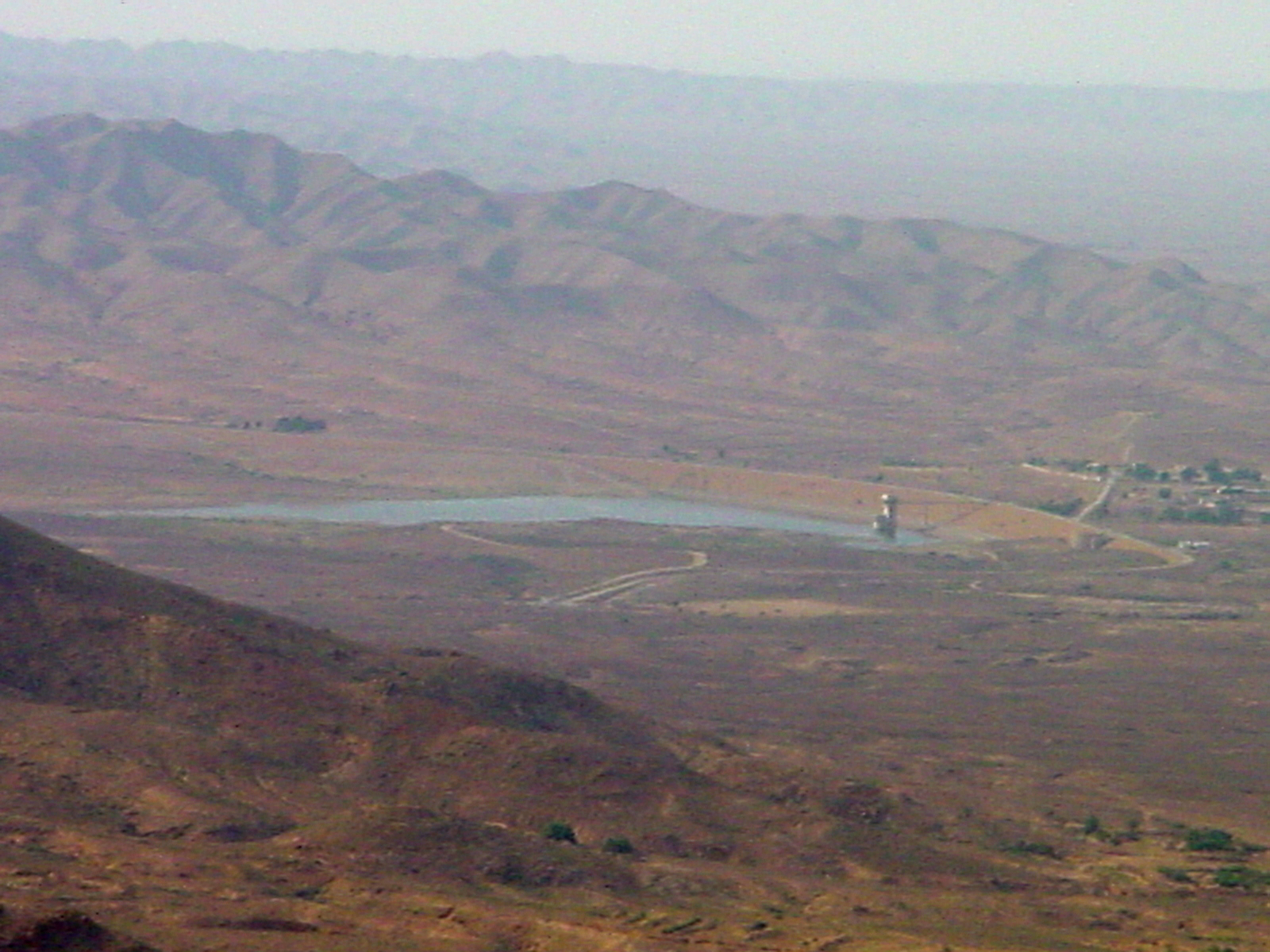
- Interactive map of asbi’a
- Coordinates: 32.6847°N 13.1755°E
- Country: Libya
- Region: Tripolitania
- License Plate Code: 50

Asbi’a (Arabic: السبيعة) is a Libyan town located about 45 km south of Tripoli.
