= Cave-dwelling Jews =

Jewish communities living in caves

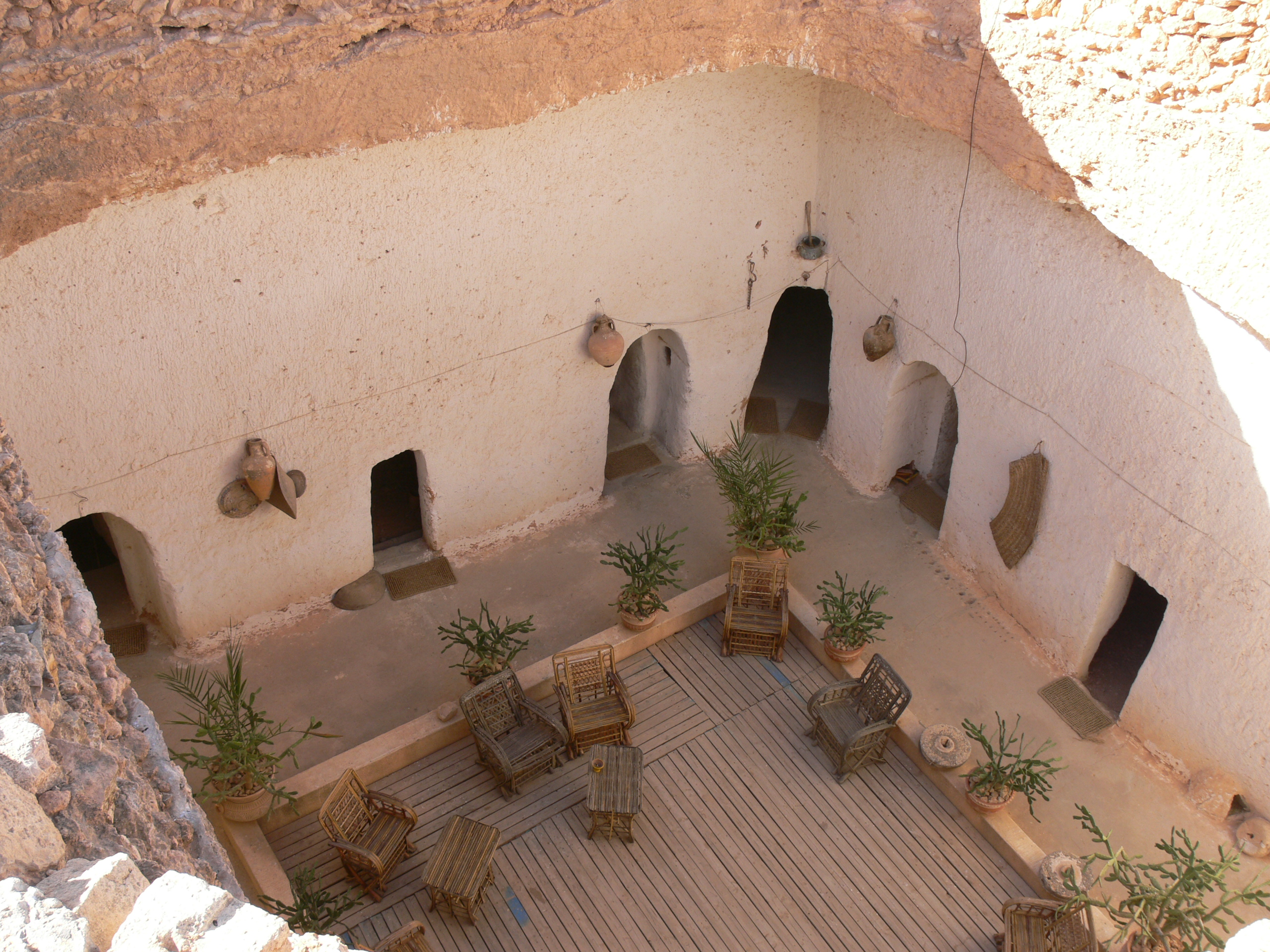
Modern appearance of cave dwellings in Ghayran

Cave dwelling Jews, also cave Jews or troglodyte Jews (from the French phrase Juifs troglodytes), were Jewish communities that dwelled in man-made caves in the mountains. The best known communities of this type existed in the Gharyan Plateau ("Jebel Gharyan") area of the Nafusa Mountains in Libya, and are commonly referred to as Gharyan Jews. These communities no longer exist today.

== History ==
Jewish tribes living in manmade caves were known for centuries in Morocco, Algeria, and in Tripolitania. Their homes and synagogues were in caves; only cemeteries were on the surface. Jewish cave dwellers of Libya were known since at least 70 CE, when Romano-Jewish historian Josephus described the Troglodytis. When Spain invaded Tripoli in 1510, many Jews fled to Gharyan (among other places), and these Jews brought with them Sephardic traditions. More information about the Ghayan Jews began to be published in the mid-19th century. The main groups of Jewish cave-dwellers were in the settlements of Gharyan, Tigrena/Tigrinna, and Beni-Abbas. In 1906, the archaeologist Nahum Slouschz visited the area and wrote a detailed account.

After Libya gained independence, most Jews, including those of Gharyan, migrated to Israel to make aliyah due to worsened conditions such as pogroms.

At present, many of these caves are occupied by Libyans, who modernized the dwellings, including the addition of electricity, running water, and sewage disposal. A number of advantages exist to this type of dwelling. Some of these cave homes are also rented out to tourists.

== Description ==
Nahum Slouschz wrote:

From time to time the keen eye discovers, amidst olive and fig trees, or near a mosque or ruins, holes open in the declivity of a hill, resembling in form the door of a cave. A little, wooden door opens before the traveler, and he enters into a kind of dark and uneven gallery, sloping all the way, to traverse which safely[,] practice alone is essential. After a walk of fifteen to twenty metres, one descends into a kind of court, feebly lighted from above by some rays of light; there is the stable, which precedes the central court, and which often serves as a workshop to the Jewish blacksmiths. Continually descending, a subterranean court is reached, which serves as a central dwelling, kitchen, and workshop, the compartments being in caves dug in the walls of the court, from which they receive a little light and air. The natives find subterranean life very natural and comfortable, though the traveler scarcely feels at ease. The Synagogue of the village Beni-Abbas is also situated in a cave, but the access is open and easy, and its roof is even above the level of the ground. At Tigrena a Synagogue has just been built entirely above the ground.

== See also ==
- Cave monastery
- Qumran Caves, once inhabited by the Essenes
- Mountain Jews
