= Ar Rajban =

Ar Rajban الرجبان Al-Rujban
- Town
- Location in Libya
- Coordinates: 31°56′25.2″N 12°5′28.89″E
- Country: Libya
- Region: Tripolitania
- Time zone: UTC+2
- License Plate Code: 24

Ar Rajban (Arabic: الرجبان) is a city in the Nafusa Mountain region of Libya. It is located southwest of Tripoli.

== Location ==
Ar Rajban is located approximately 162 km from the Libyan capital. It is bordered to the west by the city of Jadu, to the east by the city of Zintan, to the south by the Hamada al-Hamra, and to the north by the Jafara Plain. Among its towns are Tardiyah, Awlad Ubaid, Al-Barahima, Awlad Masoud, Awlad Anan, Awlad Abdul Jalil, Awlad Jaber, Awlad Atiya, and Ashfi.

== See also ==
- List of cities in Libya
