= Gharyan =

Gharyan غريان Gharian, Garyan
- City
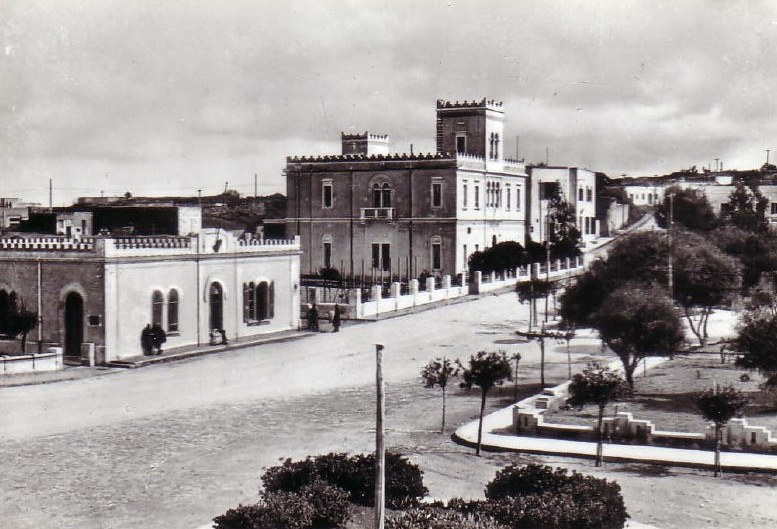
- Gharyan old town in c. 1940.

- Location in Libya
- Coordinates: 32°10′11″N 13°01′00″E
- Country: Libya
- Region: Tripolitania
- District: Jabal al Gharbi
- Elevation: 505 m (1,657 ft)
- Highest elevation: 895 m (2,936 ft)
- Lowest elevation: 158 m (518 ft)

Population (2011)
  - Total: 187,854
- Time zone: UTC+2 (EET)
- License Plate Code: 21

Gharyan is a city in northwestern Libya, in Jabal al Gharbi District, located 80 km south of Tripoli. Gharyan is one of the largest towns in the district. Prior to 2007, it was the administrative seat of Gharyan District.

In 2005, the population of Gharyan was estimated at 170,000, and it had grown to over 187,000 by 2011.

== History ==
Gharyan is in Libya, approximately 100km south of Tripoli

Gharyan was on the trade routes both south to Fezzan and over the Nafusa Mountains. The early settlement was in caves, i.e. below ground.

From 1830 until 1855 Gharyan was in revolt against its Ottoman rulers. By 1884 the Ottomans had established a mayor and town council in Gharyan.

Gharyan was considered a center of Tripolitanian resistance to the Italian invasion in the early 20th century.

Fully occupied by Italy by 1925, Gharyan was developed above ground, with a post and telegraph office, a police station, a medical clinic, several schools and a hotel being built between 1925 and 1928.

The Berber tribe Awlad Abu Say is centered around Gharyan and Mizda to the south.

=== 2011 Libyan Civil War ===
In early 2011, the city became involved in the nationwide anti-Gaddafi uprising. Initially successful, on 2 March, government forces retook it.

In April, rebels succeeded in occupying several nearby towns and establishing a second territory on the focal town and the first town demonstrate their will against regime on the 16 Feb. ZENTAIN Libya besides Misrata that is no longer under the control of the Gaddafi forces, but as of late June the rebels had still failed to take Gharyan. On 13 August 2011, the rebel forces in Libya initiated a new battle for control of the city and were in control within two days.

=== Second Libyan Civil War ===
On 4 April 2019, the city fell to forces loyal to Tobruk-based General Khalifa Haftar as part of a wider Libyan National Army (LNA) offensive in western Libya. In late June, the city was recaptured from the LNA in a counteroffensive by forces of the Tripoli-based Government of National Accord, aided in their efforts by collaborating citizens of the city mobilizing against the LNA forces. The LNA restarted the offensive in June 2020.

== Lady of Gharyan ==
Just west of Gharyan, there is a primitive road to the right, which provides a bumpy trip to a derelict former Italian barracks, a relic of World War II.

There is a crumbling building at the camp. Painted on the bricks of one of the walls inside the building is an enormous (c.4m by 10m) representation of a naked woman, lying on her side, American pin-up style. The upper torso of the woman is shaped as an inaccurate representation of the North Africa coast, and the salient points of her anatomy are marked with names of North African towns.

The "Lady of Garian" was drawn by Clifford Saber, a volunteer American ambulance driver with the British 8th Army. Saber created the mural to help boost the morale of his fellow servicemen, finishing on 2 March 1943, while his unit was housed for a few days at the barracks in Gharyan.

== Climate ==
Gharyan experiences a hot semi-arid climate (Köppen climate classification BSh), with blazing summers and cool winters; its winters being one of the coldest in Libya. Due to its winter months being 5 °C or 9 °F degrees cooler than Tripoli, the locality sees a cooler variation of said climate, though its higher elevation also meant that the town gets a dozen millimetres more precipitation then Libya's capital city.

Climate data for Gharyan, Libya (1913-1953)
Month	Jan	Feb	Mar	Apr	May	Jun	Jul	Aug	Sep	Oct	Nov	Dec	Year
Record high °C (°F)	22.0 (71.6)	28.7 (83.7)	32.4 (90.3)	35.8 (96.4)	41.5 (106.7)	40.8 (105.4)	44.8 (112.6)	44.0 (111.2)	41.2 (106.2)	42.1 (107.8)	30.1 (86.2)	23.6 (74.5)	44.8 (112.6)
Mean daily maximum °C (°F)	11.9 (53.4)	14.2 (57.6)	17.8 (64.0)	23.0 (73.4)	27.0 (80.6)	31.7 (89.1)	33.1 (91.6)	33.0 (91.4)	30.1 (86.2)	25.5 (77.9)	19.1 (66.4)	13.7 (56.7)	23.3 (74.0)
Daily mean °C (°F)	8.2 (46.8)	10.2 (50.4)	13.0 (55.4)	16.9 (62.4)	20.6 (69.1)	25.2 (77.4)	26.9 (80.4)	26.8 (80.2)	24.2 (75.6)	20.5 (68.9)	14.9 (58.8)	10.3 (50.5)	18.1 (64.7)
Mean daily minimum °C (°F)	4.5 (40.1)	6.2 (43.2)	8.2 (46.8)	10.9 (51.6)	14.3 (57.7)	18.6 (65.5)	20.6 (69.1)	20.7 (69.3)	18.4 (65.1)	15.5 (59.9)	10.7 (51.3)	6.8 (44.2)	12.9 (55.2)
Record low °C (°F)	−6.6 (20.1)	0.5 (32.9)	1.1 (34.0)	2.4 (36.3)	6.4 (43.5)	9.3 (48.7)	12.1 (53.8)	9.8 (49.6)	11.2 (52.2)	6.8 (44.2)	5.8 (42.4)	1.0 (33.8)	−6.6 (20.1)
Average precipitation mm (inches)	72.5 (2.85)	50.8 (2.00)	39.7 (1.56)	15.6 (0.61)	7.1 (0.28)	2.1 (0.08)	0.5 (0.02)	0.7 (0.03)	11.1 (0.44)	22.1 (0.87)	39.0 (1.54)	54.1 (2.13)	315.4 (12.42)
Average precipitation days (≥ 0.1 mm)	9.2	4.6	5.6	1.4	2.2	0.8	0.0	0.2	1.2	3.4	6.6	6.6	41.8
Source 1: KNMI
Source 2: NOAA (extremes and precipitation days 1932-1936)

== Transport ==
In the 1920s, the Italians built a 90 kilometres (56 mi) long railway between Tripoli and a village near Gharyan that was destroyed by the British during World War II.

== Economy ==
Thanks to its mountainous climate (considerably more moderate compared to the rest of Libya), figs are grown for local consumption, with olives and saffron, for both local use and export. Gharyan is also well known for its ceramics industry.

Libyan olive oil companies from Gharyan won silver and bronze prizes in 2020 EVO IOOC Italy International Olive Oil Contest in Palmi, Athena 2020 International Olive Oil Competition in Lesbos, and 2021 Berlin GOOA.

== See also ==
- List of cities in Libya
- Railway stations in Libya
- Cave dwelling Jews
