= Tabaqa, Libya =

Tabaqa طبقة Toubga
- Town
- Location in Libya
- Coordinates: 30°25′59″N 13°18′16″E
- Country: Libya
- District: Jabal al Gharbi
- Elevation: 487 m (1,598 ft)
- Time zone: UTC+2 (EET)

Tabaqa or Toubga (Arabic: طبقة) is a town in Jabal al Gharbi District in Libya. It is just west of Gharbiya.
