= Vehicle registration plates of Libya =

Libya
- Libyan regular legal standard number plate.
- Country: Libya
- Country code: LAR

Current series
- Size: 520 mm × 110 mm 20.5 in × 4.3 in
- Serial format: Region Code + 1 to 7 digits + ليبيا
- Colour (front): Black on white
- Colour (rear): Black on white

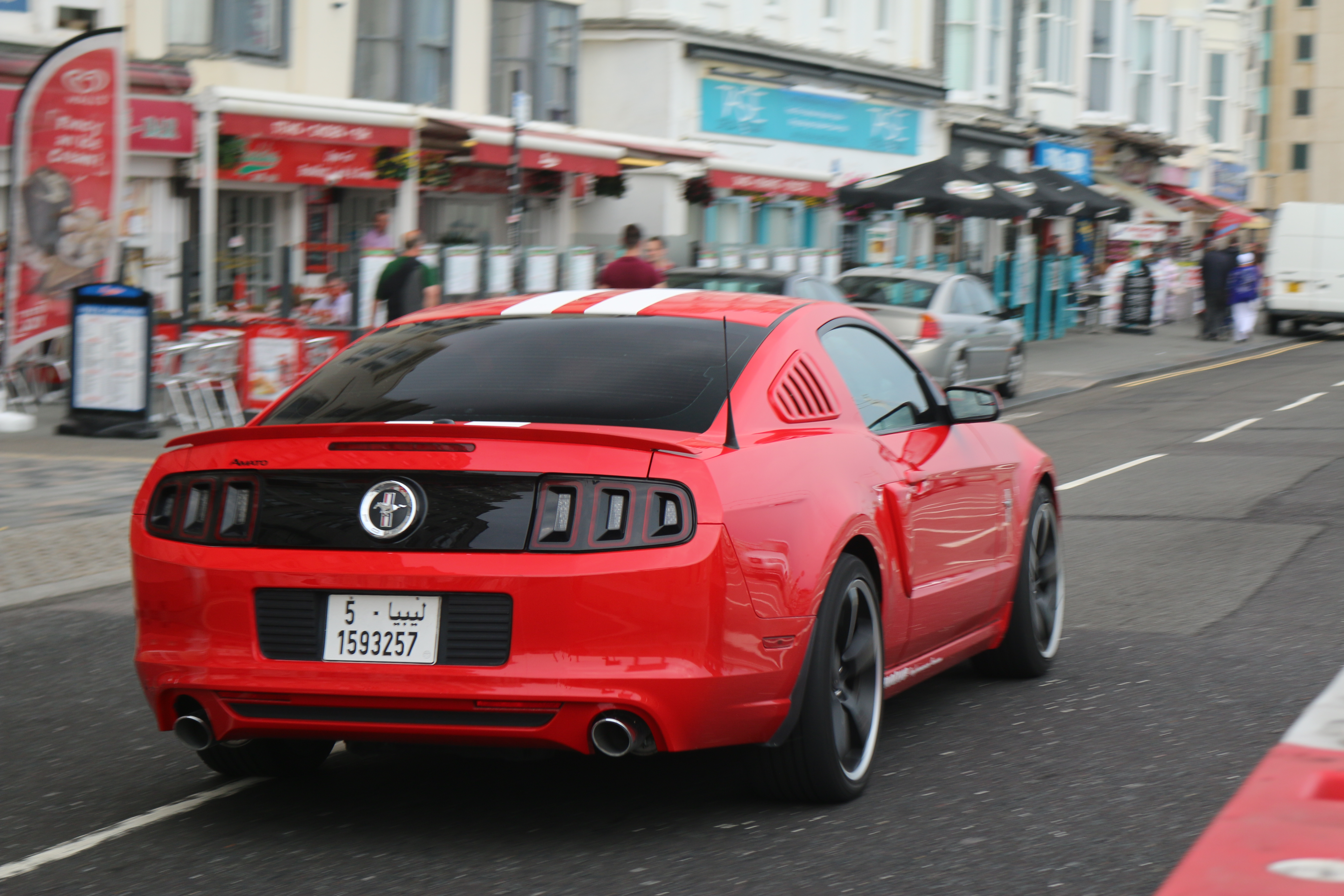
Ford Mustang with a Libyan vehicle registration plate from Tripoli in the United Kingdom.

Libya requires its residents to register their motor vehicles and display vehicle registration plates. Current plates are European standard 520 mm × 110 mm.

| Image | First issued | Design | Design (Alternative) | Slogan | Serial format | Serials issued | Notes |
|---|---|---|---|---|---|---|---|
| | 1960s | White on Black | | | | | |
| | 1997 | 2004–2013 Black on White | 1997-2004 Black on Green | الجماهيرية (Al-Jamahiriya) | | | |
| | 2013 | Black on White | | ليبيا (Libya) | Region code, 1-7 digits. | 1-7 digits. | |

== Current Series ==
Libya's current series of license plates entered circulation in 2013, after Libyan Revolution and the overthrow of Gaddafi. Numbers on license plates are in Latin Alphabet, and all plates carry the Arabic text ليبيا meaning Libya, in Naskh Script, either on the right hand side or the right top corner.

=== Private Vehicles ===
Private vehicle license plates are black on white and follow the format [# - 1 to 999999]. The First number (#), a 1 or 2 digit number consists of a code corresponding to Municipality in Libya. This number is separated by a dash from the registration code, which can be 1 to 6 digits. In the city of Tripoli, due to its larger population, 7-digit registration codes are also issued.

520 mm × 110 mm

270 mm x 150 mm

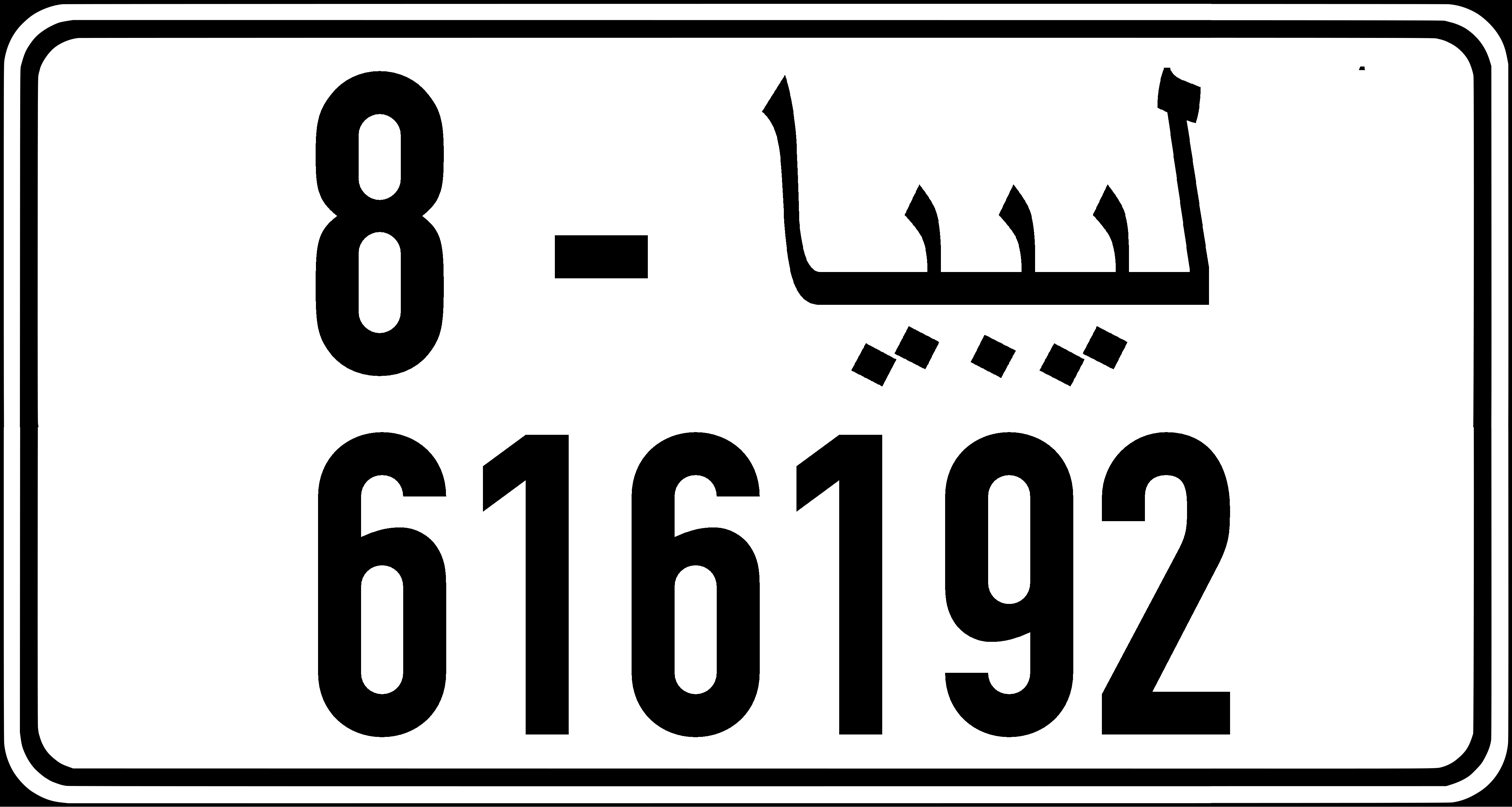

=== Foreigner-owned Private Vehicles ===
Foreigner-owned Private vehicle license plates are black on white and follow the format [NN /# - 1 to 9999]. The plate consists of a 2 or 3 digit code in a blue square (NN), indicating the country of the owner of the vehicle. It also includes the municipality code, separated by dash from the registration code that is 1 to 4 digits long.

520 mm × 110 mm

270 mm x 150 mm

=== Diplomatic and Consular Vehicles ===
Diplomatic and consular license plates are black on red, and follow the format [1 to 99 - NN هيئة سياسية]. This type of plate does not have "ليبيا" (Libya) written on it, but instead, "هيئة سياسية", in Ruqʿah script. This means "Political Corps". The format of this license plate consists of a 1 or 2 digit number, separated by a dash from a 2 or 3 digit code indicating the country of the owner of the vehicle (NN). This code is identical to that used for Foreigner-owned private vehicles.

520 mm × 110 mm

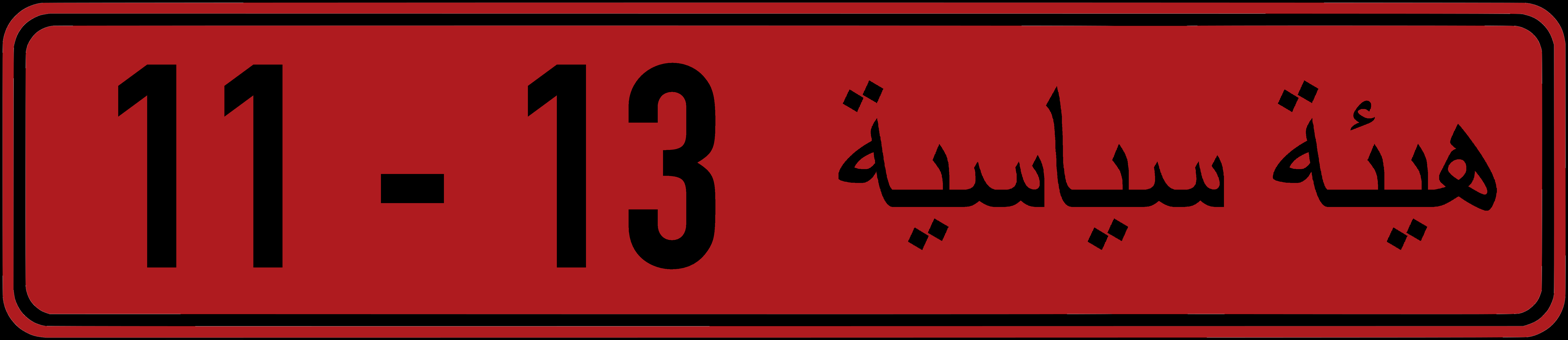

270 mm x 150 mm

=== Agricultural Vehicles ===
Agricultural vehicle license plates are black on yellow and follow the format [ز# - 1 to 999999]. The plate starts with the Arabic letter ز (Z), followed by number (#) on the left hand side, a 1 or 2 digit number consists of a code corresponding to Municipality in Libya. This number is separated by a dash from the registration code, which can be 1 to 6 digits. On a two-line plate, the positioning of the Arabic letter-code is bottom left of the license plate.

520 mm × 110 mm

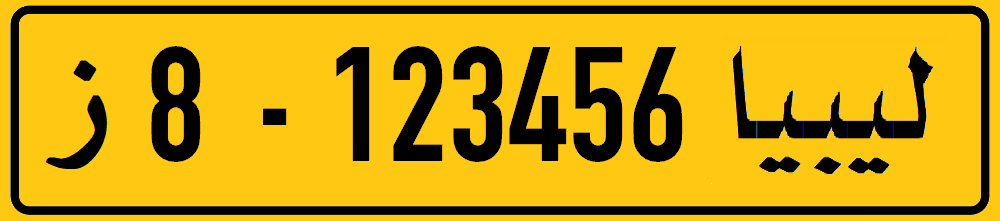

270 mm x 150 mm

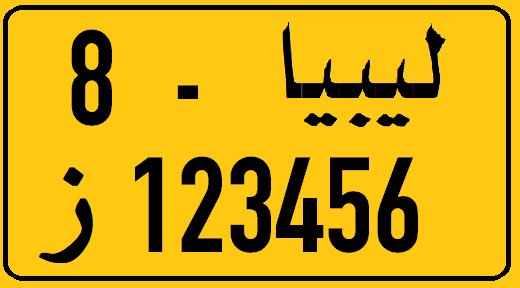

=== Commercial Vehicles ===
Commercial vehicle license plates are black on yellow and follow the format [ن# - 1 to 999999]. Commercial vehicles consist of trucks, buses, vans, but not taxis, and not semi-trucks. The plate starts with the Arabic letter ن (N), followed by number (#), a 1 or 2 digit number consists of a code corresponding to Municipality in Libya. This number is separated by a dash from the registration code, which can be 1 to 6 digits. On a two-line plate, the positioning of the Arabic letter-code is bottom left of the license plate.

520 mm × 110 mm

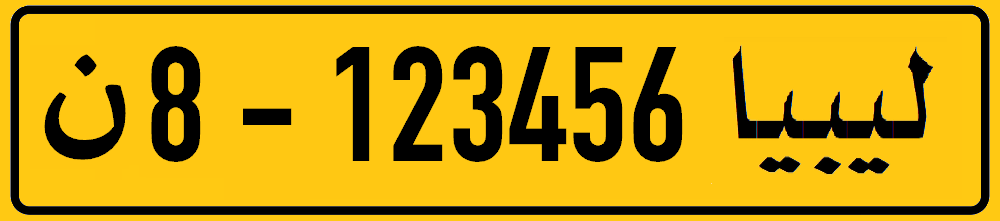

270 mm x 150 mm

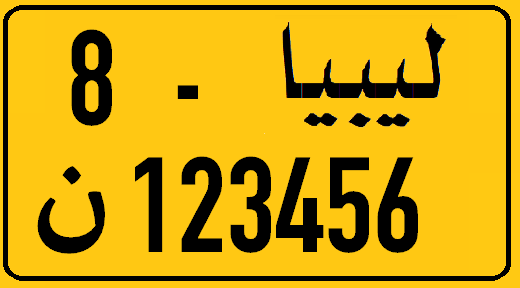

=== Taxis ===
Taxi license plates are black on yellow and follow the format [ر# - 1 to 999999]. The plate starts with the Arabic letter ر (R), followed by number (#), a 1 or 2 digit number consists of a code corresponding to Municipality in Libya. This number is separated by a dash from the registration code, which can be 1 to 6 digits. On a two-line plate, the positioning of the Arabic letter-code is bottom left of the license plate.

520 mm × 110 mm

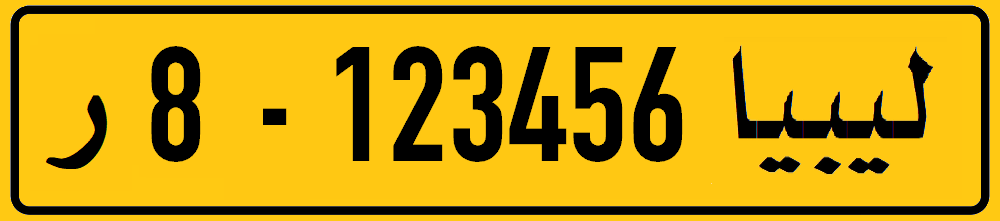

270 mm x 150 mm

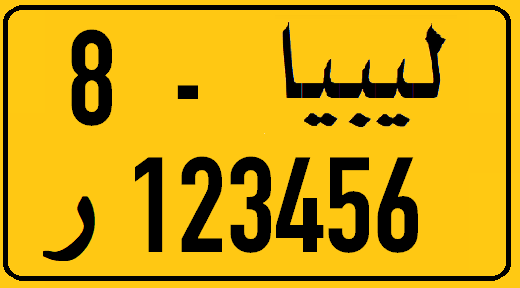

=== Semi-trucks ===
Semi-truck (Trucks that carry Semi-trailers, collectively referred to as 18-wheeler) license plates are black on yellow and follow the format [ج# - 1 to 999999]. Semi-trucks are allocated their own unique code from other trucks and commercial vehicles in Libya. The plate starts with the Arabic letter ج (J), followed by number (#), a 1 or 2 digit number consists of a code corresponding to Municipality in Libya. This number is separated by a dash from the registration code, which can be 1 to 6 digits. On a two-line plate, the positioning of the Arabic letter-code is bottom left of the license plate.

520 mm × 110 mm

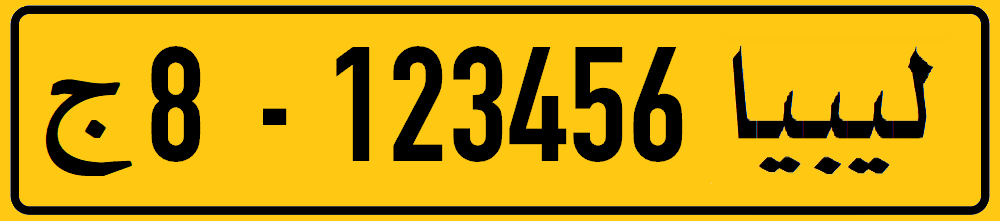

270 mm x 150 mm

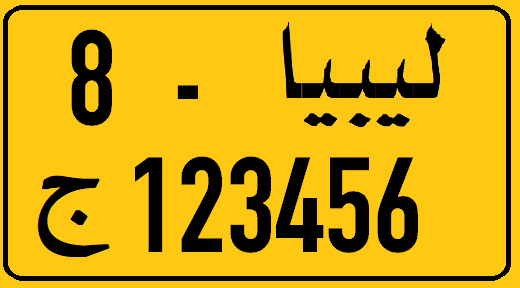

=== Trailers ===
Trailers or Semi-trailers(Trailers carried by Semi-trucks, collectively referred to as 18-wheeler) license plates are black on yellow and follow the format [م# - 1 to 999999]. The plate starts with the Arabic letter م (M), followed by number (#), a 1 or 2 digit number consists of a code corresponding to Municipality in Libya. This number is separated by a dash from the registration code, which can be 1 to 6 digits. On a two-line plate, the positioning of the Arabic letter-code is bottom left of the license plate.

520 mm × 110 mm

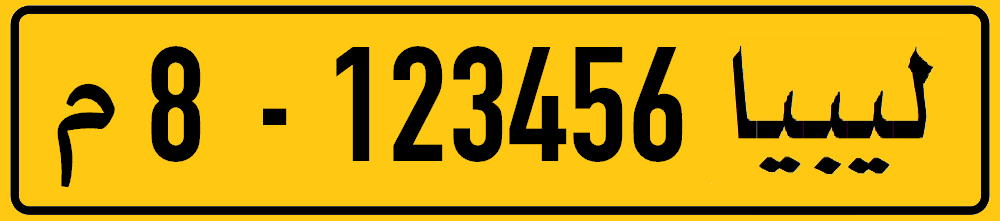

270 mm x 150 mm

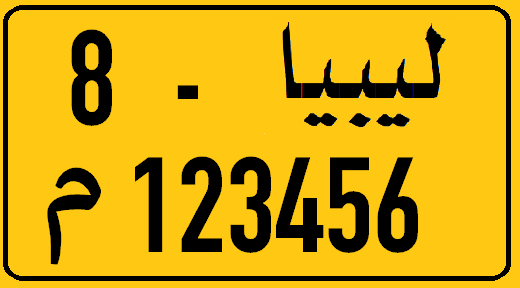

== 1998 to 2012 Series ==
License plates in this era had an identical colour composition as the current series, black on white for private vehicles, black on red for diplomatic vehicles, and black on yellow for other types of vehicles. Instead of ليبيا (Libya), these license plates carried the term الجماهيرية (Al-Jamahiriya) either on the right hand side or the right top corner in Ruqʿah script. Jamahiriyais an Arabic term generally translated roughly to "peopledom" or "state of the masses". This term was used, as Libya's official name under Gaddafi was Libyan Arab Jamahiriya .

The license plates had a format [XX - # - 1 to 99999] or [XX - ## - 1 to 99999]. The plate consisted of a 1 or 2 digit code corresponding to Municipality in Libya, similar to the current series. However, this number was preceded by another 1 or two digit code XX, which corresponded to the subdivisions within each municipality. For example, in Tripoli (Code 5)

- 7 - 5 corresponded to Ben Ashour in Tripoli
- 28 - 5 corresponded to Hay Al Andalus in Tripoli
- 45 - 5 corresponded to Center of City in Tripoli

These codes have since been abolished. This was followed by a 1 to 5 digit registration code.

Below table demonstrates an example of private vehicle license plates. As stated previously, registration plates of other vehicles have the same letter code and colour configuration as the current series, but with the difference of including the sub-municipality code, as well as including the word الجماهيرية Al-Jamahiriya instead of ليبيا Libya.

520 mm × 110 mm

270 mm x 150 mm

== Municipality Codes ==
Below is the list of Municipality Vehicle registration codes in Libya.

| Code | Municipality | District | Historic Region | Code | Municipality | District | Historic Region | Code | Municipality | District | Historic Region |
|---|---|---|---|---|---|---|---|---|---|---|---|
| 1 | Sabha | Sabha | Fezzan | 22 | Yafran | Jabal al Gharbi | Tripolitania | 48 | Kabaw | Nalut | Tripolitania |
| 2 | Bayda | Jabal al Akhdar | Cyrenaica | 24 | Ubari | Wadi al Hayaa | Fezzan | 49 | Al Qubbah | Derna | Cyrenaica |
| 3 | Misrata | Misrata | Tripolitania | 25 | Aziziya | Jafara | Tripolitania | 50 | Al Asbi'a | Jabal al Gharbi | Tripolitania |
| 4 | Zawiya | Zawiya | Tripolitania | 26 | Sabratha | Zawiya | Tripolitania | 51 | Ras Lanuf | Sirte | Tripolitania |
| 5 | Tripoli | Tripoli | Tripolitania | 27 | Tarhuna | Murqub | Tripolitania | 52 | Tocra | Marj | Cyrenaica |
| 6 | Al Khums | Murqub | Tripolitania | 28 | Bani Walid | Misrata | Tripolitania | 53 | Kikla | Jabal al Gharbi | Tripolitania |
| 7 | Sirte | Sirte | Tripolitania | 30 | Al Abyar | Marj | Cyrenaica | 54 | Al Rhibat | Jabal al Gharbi | Tripolitania |
| 8 | Benghazi | Benghazi | Cyrenaica | 32 | Ghat | Ghat | Fezzan | 55 | Al Shatii al Gharbi | Wadi al Shatii | Fezzan |
| 9 | Zuwarah | Nuqat al Khams | Tripolitania | 33 | Qasr bin Ghashir | Tripoli | Tripolitania | 56 | Al Rijban | Jabal al Gharbi | Tripolitania |
| 10 | Derna | Derna | Cyrenaica | 35 | Shahhat (Cyrene) | Jabal al Akhdar | Cyrenaica | 57 | Harraba | Nalut | Tripolitania |
| 11 | Al Shatii al Sharqi | Wadi al Shatii | Fezzan | 36 | Zliten | Murqub | Tripolitania | 58 | Southern Marj | Marj | Cyrenaica |
| 12 | Ajdabiya | Al Wahat | Cyrenaica | 37 | Baten Al Jabal | Nalut | Tripolitania | 59 | Al Shagiga | Jabal al Gharbi | Tripolitania |
| 13 | Hun | Jufra | Fezzan | 38 | Mizda | Jabal al Gharbi | Tripolitania | 60 | Ras al-Helal | Derna | Cyrenaica |
| 14 | Tobruk | Butnan | Cyrenaica | 40 | Jumayl | Nuqat al Khams | Tripolitania | 61 | Zaltan | Nuqat al Khams | Tripolitania |
| 15 | Murzuq | Murzuq | Fezzan | 41 | Al Ajaylat | Nuqat al Khams | Tripolitania | 62 | Qatrun | Murzuq | Fezzan |
| 16 | Jalu | Al Wahat | Cyrenaica | 42 | Zintan | Jabal al Gharbi | Tripolitania | 63 | Janzur | Tripoli | Tripolitania |
| 17 | Ghadames | Nalut | Tripolitania | 43 | Jadu | Jabal al Gharbi | Tripolitania | 64 | Al Shwayrif | Jabal al Gharbi | Tripolitania |
| 18 | Marj | Marj | Cyrenaica | 44 | Msallata | Murqub | Tripolitania | 65 | Al Riyayna | Jabal al Gharbi | Tripolitania |
| 19 | Nalut | Nalut | Tripolitania | 45 | Sahel El-Jebel | Jabal al Akhdar | Cyrenaica | 66 | Suluq; Qaminis | Benghazi | Cyrenaica |
| 20 | Kufra | Kufra | Cyrenaica | 46 | Castelverde | Tripoli | Tripolitania | 67 | Awjila; Jikharra | Al Wahat | Cyrenaica |
| 21 | Gharyan | Jabal al Gharbi | Tripolitania | 47 | Sorman | Zawiya | Tripolitania | | | | |

== Foreign Countries Codes ==
| Code | Country |
|---|---|
| 10 | Palestine |
| 11 | Egypt |
| 12 | Germany |
| 13 | Tunisia |
| 14 | Lebanon |
| 15 | Italy |
| 16 | France |
| 17 | Turkey |
| 18 | Algeria |
| 19 | Serbia |
| 20 | United Kingdom |
| 21 | Saudi Arabia |
| 22 | Greece |
| 23 | Russia |
| 24 | Morocco |
| 25 | China |
| 26 | United States |
| 27 | Czech Republic |
| 28 | Spain |
| 30 | Iraq |
| 31 | Sudan |
| 32 | Pakistan |
| 33 | Venezuela |
| 34 | Kuwait |
| 35 | Bulgaria |
| 37 | Syria |
| 38 | Poland |
| 39 | Hungary |
| 40 | Switzerland |
| 41 | Denmark |
| 42 | Finland |
| 43 | Sweden |
| 44 | Chad |
| 45 | Austria |
| 46 | Netherlands |
| 47 | Slovakia |
| 48 | India |
| 49 | Yemen |
| 50 | Bosnia and Herzegovina |
| 51 | Mauritania |
| 52 | Niger |
| 53 | Nigeria |
| 54 | Romania |
| 55 | Japan |
| 56 | United Arab Emirates |
| 58 | Somalia |
| 59 | Brazil |
| 60 | Uganda |
| 61 | DR Congo |
| 62 | Rwanda |
| 63 | DPR Korea |
| 64 | Argentina |
| 65 | Bangladesh |
| 66 | Burundi |
| 67 | Guinea Conackry |
| 68 | Qatar |
| 69 | The Gambia |
| 70 | Cuba |
| 71 | Togo |
| 72 | Central African Republic |
| 73 | Afghanistan |
| 74 | Malaysia |
| 75 | Philippines |
| 76 | Ethiopia |
| 77 | Gabon |
| 78 | Vietnam |
| 79 | Jordan |
| 80 | Senegal |
| 81 | Australia |
| 82 | Panama |
| 83 | South Korea |
| 84 | Benin |
| 85 | Mali |
| 86 | Iran |
| 87 | Nicaragua |
| 88 | Ghana |
| 89 | Grenada |
| 90 | Burkina Faso |
| 91 | Cyprus |
| 92 | Bahrain |
| 93 | Oman |
| 94 | Djibouti |
| 95 | Comoros |
| 96 | South Africa |
| 97 | Cameroon |
| 99 | Eritrea |
| 106 | Zimbabwe |
| 108 | Liberia |
| 111 | Malawi |
| 119 | Indonesia |
| 120 | Ukraine |
| 125 | Canada |
| 130 | Norway |
| 157 | Ireland |
| 180 | Belarus |
| 190 | Holy See |

== Italian Africa (1913-1941) ==
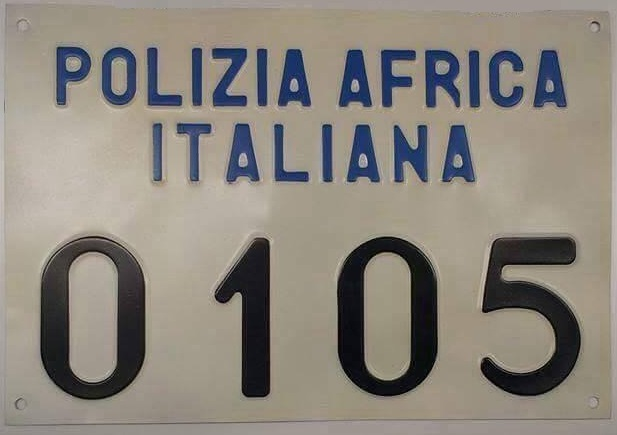
Italian African Police rear plate

The very first Italian registration plates, from 1913 to the end of the 1920s, were rectangular, with a white background and with the name or initials of the colony in red followed by the registration number, on a single line, but the documentation on this is fragmentary. For the Italian colonial troops, however, special military service plates were used with the initials SOM (Somalia) or T (Tripolitania) in front. Subsequently, until 1935, the Italian colonies used white plates on black with a colonial code on the first line, and up to 5 numbers on the second line. The numbers, in relief, were assigned serially and the plates were made of metal, with the fasces as a seal. The colonial codes were:

- ERITREA, later ER for Eritrea
- SOMALIA, later SOM for Somalia
- TRIPOLI for Tripolitania
- CNA for Cyrenaica
