= Nuqat al Khams =

District of Libya

Coordinates: 32°35′41″N 11°53′41″E

Nuqat al Khams النقاط الخمس
- District
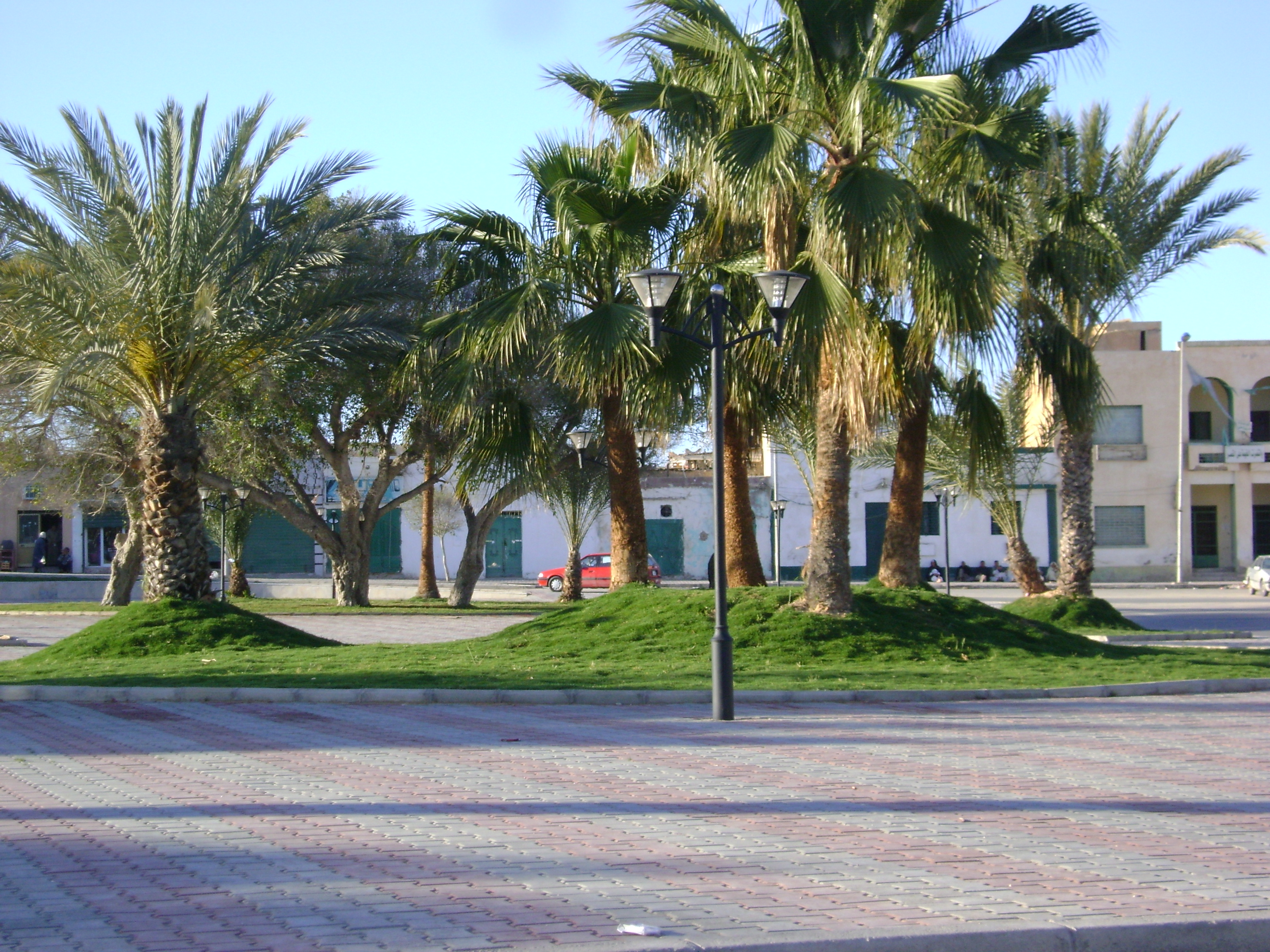

- Map of Libya with Nuqat al Khams district highlighted
- Country: Libya
- Capital: Zuwara

Area
  - Total: 5,250 km^{2} (2,030 sq mi)

Population (2012)
  - Total: 292,440
  - Density: 55.7/km^{2} (144/sq mi)
- License Plate Code: 9, 40, 41, 61

Nuqat al Khams (Arabic: النقاط الخمس Nuqāṭ al Ḫams lit. 'The five points') is one of the districts of Libya. It is in the northwest of the country, in what had been the historical region of Tripolitania. Its capital is Zuwara. Nuqat al Khams has a northern shoreline on the Mediterranean Sea. To the west, it borders the Medenine Governorate of Tunisia. Domestically, it borders the districts of Zawiya to the east, Jabal al Gharbi to the southeast, and Nalut to the southwest. Nuqat al Khams is a part of the Tripolitania geographical region of Libya.

Per the census of 2012, the total population in the region was 157,747 with 150,353 Libyans. In total, there were 22,713 households in the district, with 20,907 households belonging to Libyans. The population density of the district was 1.86 persons per sq. km. The Al-Watiya Air Base is located here.

== Geography ==
In the north, Nuqat al Khams has a shoreline on the Mediterranean Sea. To the west, it borders the Medenine Governorate of Tunisia. Domestically, it borders Zawiya in the east, Jabal al Gharbi in the southeast and Nalut in the southwest. Nuqat al Khams is a part of Triplotania geographical region of Libya that runs from north to south. It has a set of coastal oases, plains, and limestone plateaus having an elevation of 2,000 ft (610 m) to 3,000 ft (910 m). The region receives average annual rainfall of 16 in (410 mm). There are no perennial rivers in the region, but groundwater aquifers are abundant. Along the coastal region, the climate is Mediterranean; elsewhere, it is desert. Dust storms lasting four to eight days are common during spring. The northwest region of Libya including Nuqat al Khams is called Tripolitania, the east is referred to as Cyrenaica, and Fezzen is in the southwest.

== Demographics ==
Per the census of 2012, the total population in the region was 157,747 with 150,353 Libyans. The size of the average Libyan household in the country was 6.9, with the average household size of non-Libyans being 3.7. There were 22,713 households in the district, with 20,907 identifying as Libyan. The population density of the district was 1.86 persons per sq. km. Per 2006 census, there were in total 111,646 economically active people in the district. There were 64,359 government employees, 3,680 employers, 32,901 first level workers and 697 second level workers. There were 22,669 workers in state administration, 6,201 in agriculture, animal husbandry, and forestry, 6,053 in agriculture & hunting, 36,296 in education, 6,634 in private enterprise, 4,682 in health & social work, 6,463 in production, 36,215 in technical work and 1,216 service workers. The total enrollment in schools was 87,319 and the number of people above secondary stage was 4,254. As per the report from World Health Organization (WHO), there were no communicable disease centres, one dental clinic, four general clinics, eight in-patient clinics, 18 out-patient clinics, 64 pharmacies, 80 PHC centres, one polyclinic, and no rural clinics or specialized clinics.

== Administration ==
With the creation of the shabiyah system, Nuqat al Khams was reduced in size. Libya became independent in 1951 from the colonial empire; with independence it became known for its rich oil resources. As a part of decentralization in 2012, the country is administratively split into 13 regions from the original 25 municipalities, which were further divided in 1,500 communes. As of 2016, there were 22 administrative divisions in the country in the form of districts.
