= Wadi al Hayaa District =

District of Libya

Coordinates: 26°15′N 12°30′E

Wadi al Hayaa وادي الحياة
- District
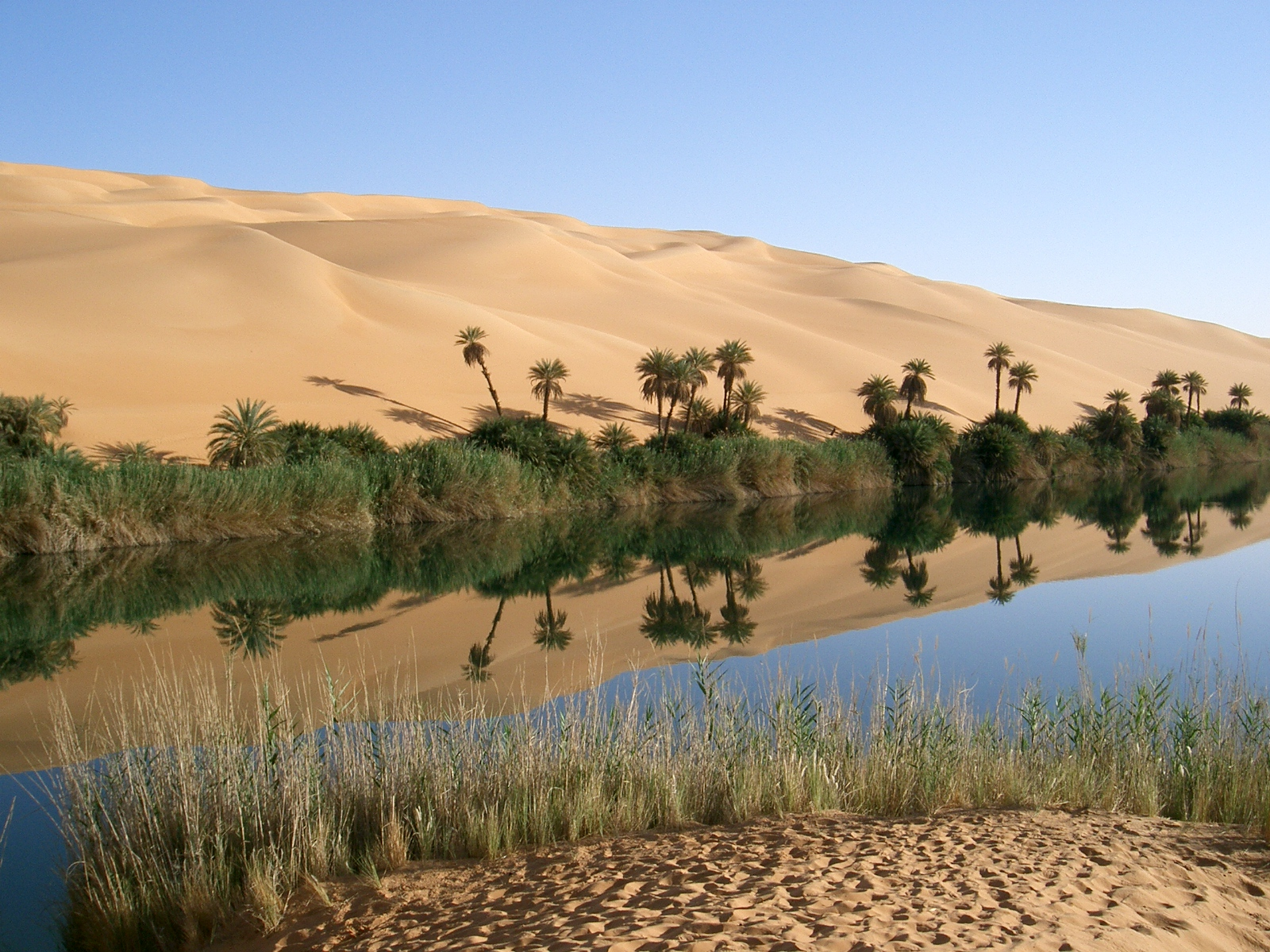

- Map of Libya with Wadi Al Hayaa district highlighted
- Country: Libya
- Capital: Ubari

Area
  - Total: 31,890 km^{2} (12,310 sq mi)

Population (2006)
  - Total: 76,858
  - Density: 2.410/km^{2} (6.242/sq mi)
- ISO 3166 code: LY-WD
- License Plate Code: 24

Wadi al Hayaa (Arabic: وادي الحياة Wādī al Ḥayāh) is one of the districts of Libya. Its capital is the city of Ubari. As of 2006, it had a population of 72,587, area of 31,890 square kilometres (12,310 sq mi) and a population density of 2.28 persons per square kilometer.

== Geography ==
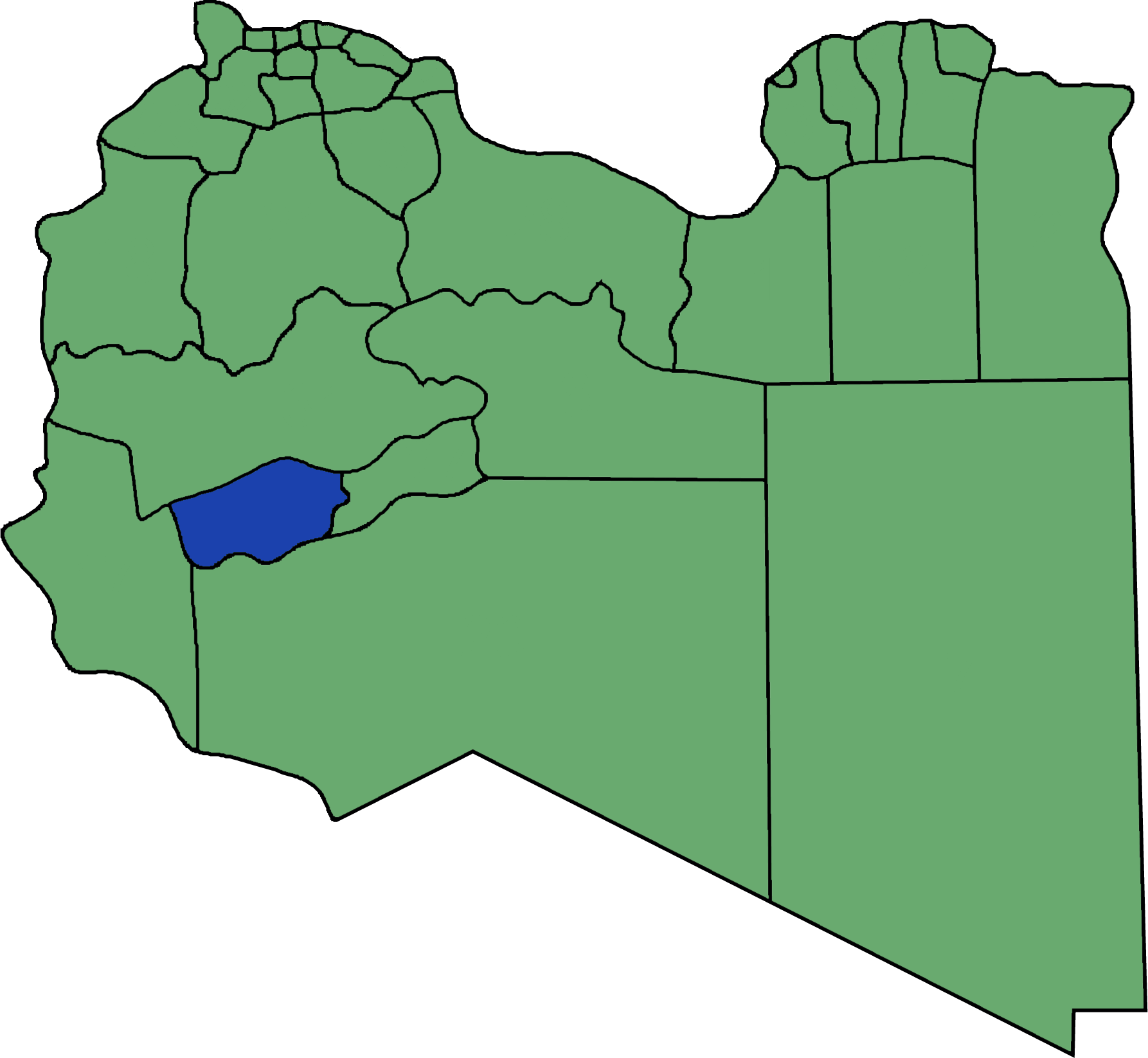
The same district between 2001 and 2007

The district is bordered by Wadi al Shatii in the north, Sabha in the east, Murzuq in the south and Ghat in the west. The district is part of the Fezzen geographical division of Libya which is mostly desert. The region receives an annual rainfall of 2.5 in (64 mm). There are no perennial rivers in the region, but the region is abundant with groundwater aquifers. Libya has mostly a flat undulating plain and occasional plateau, with an average elevation of around 423 m (1,388 ft). Around 91 per cent of the land ? is covered by desert, with only 8.8 per cent agricultural land (with only 1% arable lands) and 0.1 per cent of forests. The major resource found in the area is manganese. The Fezzen region has a desert climate. Dust storms lasting four to eight days are quite common during Spring. Fezzen is in southwest Libya.

== Demographics ==
Per the census estimates of 2012, the total population in the region was 157,747 with 150,353 Libyans. The average size of the household in the country was 6.9, while the average household size of non-Libyans being 3.7. There were totally 22,713 households in the district, with 20,907 Libyan ones. The population density of the district was 1.86 persons per sq. km. Per 2006 census, there were totally 27,322 economically active people in the district. There were 14,650 government employees, 2,644 employers, 8,994 first level workers and 001 second level workers. There were 6,526 workers in state administration, 3,998 in agriculture, animal husbandry and forestry, 4,252 in agriculture & hunting, 6,511 in education, 2,226 in private enterprises, 1,419 in health & social work, 1,267 in production, 5,817 in technical work and 321 service workers. The total enrollment in schools was 26,890 and the number of people above secondary stage and less than graduation was 1,494. As per the report from World Health Organization (WHO), there were no communicable disease centres, two dental clinics, two out-patient clinics, 16 pharmacies, 36 PHC centres, one rural clinics and no specialized clinics.
