= Nalut =

Nalut نالوت Nalút
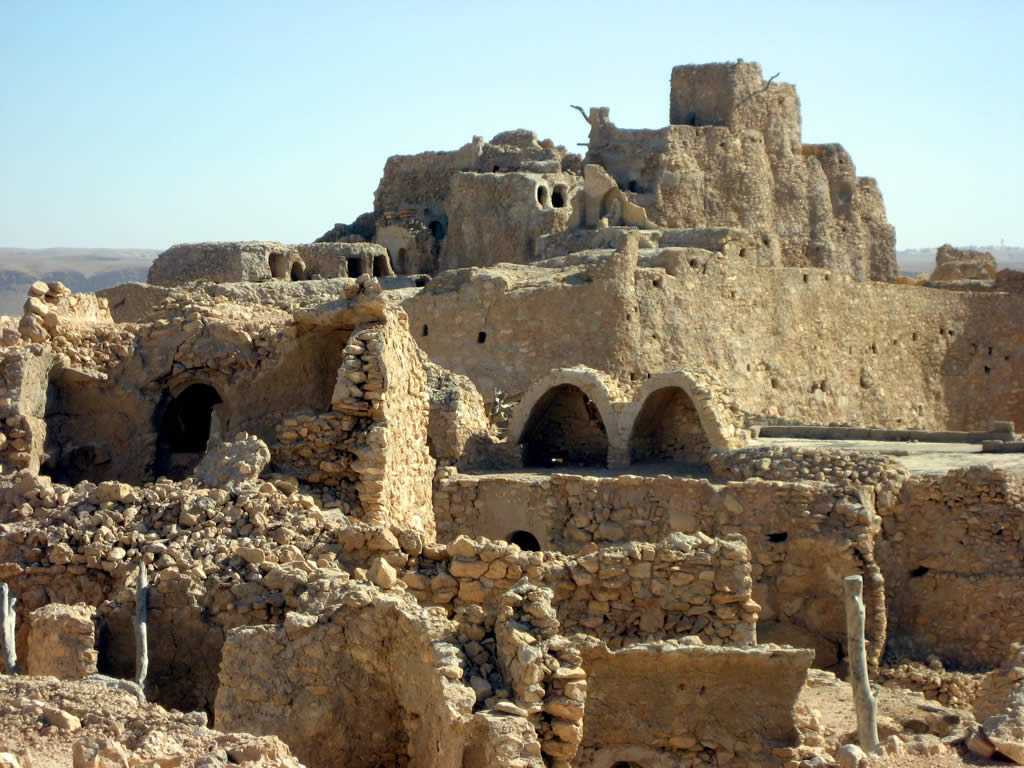

- Location in Libya
- Coordinates: 31°52′06″N 10°58′57″E
- Country: Libya
- Region: Tripolitania
- District: Nalut
- Elevation: 789 m (2,589 ft)

Population (2012)
  - Total: 26,788
- calculated
- Time zone: UTC+2 (EET)
- License Plate Code: 19

Nalut (Arabic: نالوت) is the capital of the Nalut District in northwestern Libya. Nalut lies approximately halfway between Tripoli and Ghadames, at the western end of the Nafusa Mountains coastal range, in the Tripolitania region.

== History ==
=== Name ===
The name Nalut and its alternate Lalut may derive from the pagan Berber goddess of springs, Tala. As Nalut is only 60 km from the Tunisian border and lies close to some oases, it played an important part in the caravan trade.

=== Architecture ===
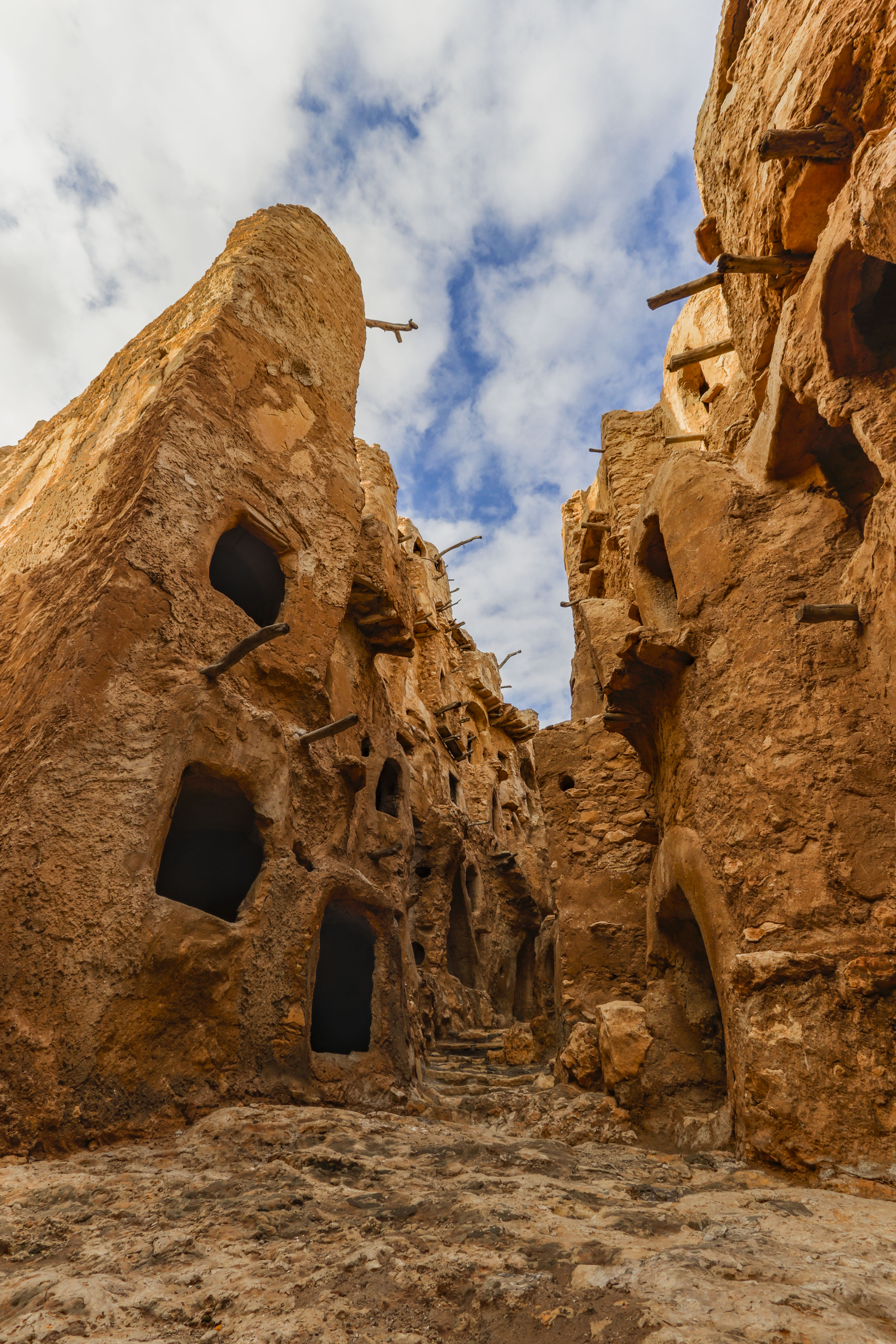
Central View of Qasr Nalut

Nalut is home to the Qasr Nalut, which is a granary fortified by a ksour (castle). The facility has been abandoned but is a tourist destination. The fortress was a communal building where the local families could store their grain in times of conflict.

The Alal'a Mosque – which is Nalut's oldest mosque – was rebuilt in 1312 CE.

=== Libyan civil war ===
A monument to Muammar Gaddafi's Green Book in the town square was demolished during the Libyan Civil War.

In late April 2011, "Radio Free Nalut" began broadcasting in the city. It was one of several rebel-controlled radio stations established during the civil war and conducted broadcasts in Berber.

A national reconciliation conference for the factions in the Libyan Civil War was held in Nalut in September 2016.

=== Museum ===
Nalut contains the Nalut Dinosaur Museum, which exhibits fossil trees, crocodiles and dinosaurs which have been discovered in the vicinity of the town since the first find in 1998.

== Climate ==
Nalut has a hot desert climate (Köppen: BWh) with hot, dry summers and cold winters with occasional rain.

Climate data for Nalut (1991–2020)
Month	Jan	Feb	Mar	Apr	May	Jun	Jul	Aug	Sep	Oct	Nov	Dec	Year
Record high °C (°F)	29.0 (84.2)	32.7 (90.9)	35.2 (95.4)	39.0 (102.2)	42.1 (107.8)	44.1 (111.4)	45.0 (113.0)	44.0 (111.2)	41.5 (106.7)	39.0 (102.2)	33.6 (92.5)	27.8 (82.0)	45.0 (113.0)
Mean daily maximum °C (°F)	14.4 (57.9)	15.9 (60.6)	20.1 (68.2)	24.8 (76.6)	29.3 (84.7)	33.1 (91.6)	35.0 (95.0)	35.0 (95.0)	32.0 (89.6)	27.1 (80.8)	20.5 (68.9)	15.4 (59.7)	25.2 (77.4)
Daily mean °C (°F)	10.4 (50.7)	11.5 (52.7)	15.1 (59.2)	19.0 (66.2)	23.0 (73.4)	26.7 (80.1)	28.7 (83.7)	29.0 (84.2)	26.5 (79.7)	22.2 (72.0)	16.2 (61.2)	11.5 (52.7)	20.0 (68.0)
Mean daily minimum °C (°F)	6.4 (43.5)	7.1 (44.8)	10.1 (50.2)	13.1 (55.6)	16.7 (62.1)	20.3 (68.5)	22.4 (72.3)	23.0 (73.4)	20.9 (69.6)	17.3 (63.1)	12.0 (53.6)	7.7 (45.9)	14.8 (58.6)
Record low °C (°F)	−2.0 (28.4)	−2.0 (28.4)	−0.5 (31.1)	2.4 (36.3)	6.6 (43.9)	9.0 (48.2)	13.0 (55.4)	13.2 (55.8)	12.6 (54.7)	8.2 (46.8)	1.0 (33.8)	−0.5 (31.1)	−2.0 (28.4)
Average precipitation mm (inches)	13.4 (0.53)	23.0 (0.91)	18.7 (0.74)	9.8 (0.39)	7.2 (0.28)	2.0 (0.08)	0.0 (0.0)	0.3 (0.01)	5.0 (0.20)	20.2 (0.80)	9.7 (0.38)	19.3 (0.76)	128.6 (5.06)
Average precipitation days (≥ 1.0 mm)	2.1	2.4	2.1	1.2	1.0	0.4	0.0	0.2	1.1	1.8	1.6	2.3	16.2
Average relative humidity (%)	59.1	55.7	51.7	47.4	45.1	43.2	42.0	45.2	51.1	54.9	56.9	60.1	51.0
Average dew point °C (°F)	2.1 (35.8)	2.1 (35.8)	3.9 (39.0)	5.7 (42.3)	8.6 (47.5)	11.1 (52.0)	12.8 (55.0)	14.2 (57.6)	13.9 (57.0)	11.5 (52.7)	7.1 (44.8)	3.5 (38.3)	8.0 (46.4)
Source: NOAA

== See also ==
- List of cities in Libya
- 2011 Nafusa Mountains Campaign
- Nalut Dinosaur Museum
