= Wadi al Shatii District =

District of Libya

Coordinates: 28°N 13°E

Wadi al Shatii وادي الشاطئ
- District
- Map of Libya with Wadi al Shatii district highlighted
- Country: Libya
- Capital: Brak

Area
  - Total: 97,160 km^{2} (37,510 sq mi)

Population (2006)
  - Total: 78,532
  - Density: 0.8083/km^{2} (2.093/sq mi)
- License Plate Code: 11, 55

Wadi al Shati (Arabic: وادي الشاطئ), sometimes referred to as Ashati (Arabic: الشاطئ), is one of the central-west districts of Libya. The area is mostly desert. Wadi al Shati District is named after the depression (former lakebed) of the same name, Wadi Alshati.

To the west, Wadi al Shati borders the Illizi Province of Algeria. After the 2007 administrative reorganization of districts, it borders on Nalut in northwest, Jabal al Gharbi in the north, Jufra in the east, Sabha in the southeast, Wadi al Hayaa in the south and Ghat in the southwest.

== Geography ==
The depression extends east from the town of Ashkda to the town of Edri on the west, a distance of about 140 kilometers. To the west, Wadi al Shati borders the Illizi Province of Algeria. After the 2007 administrative reorganization of districts, it borders on the following districts: Nalut in northwest, Jabal al Gharbi in the north, Jufra in the east, Sabha in the southeast, Wadi al Hayaa in the south and Ghat in the southwest. The district is part of the Fezzen geographical division of Libya which is mostly full of deserts. The region receives an average annual rainfall of 2.5 in (64 mm). There are no perennial rivers in the region, but the region is abundant with groundwater aquifers. Libya has mostly a flat undulating plain and occasional plateau, with an average elevation of around 423 m (1,388 ft). Around 91 per cent of the land is covered by desert, with only 8.8 per cent agricultural land (with only 1% arable lands) and 0.1 per cent of forests. The major resource found in the area is manganese. Along the coastal regions, the climate is Mediterranean, while it is desert climate in all other parts. Dust storms lasting four to eight days are rather common during Spring. Triplotania is the northwest region, while it is Cyrenacia in the east and Fezzen in southwest.

== Demographics ==
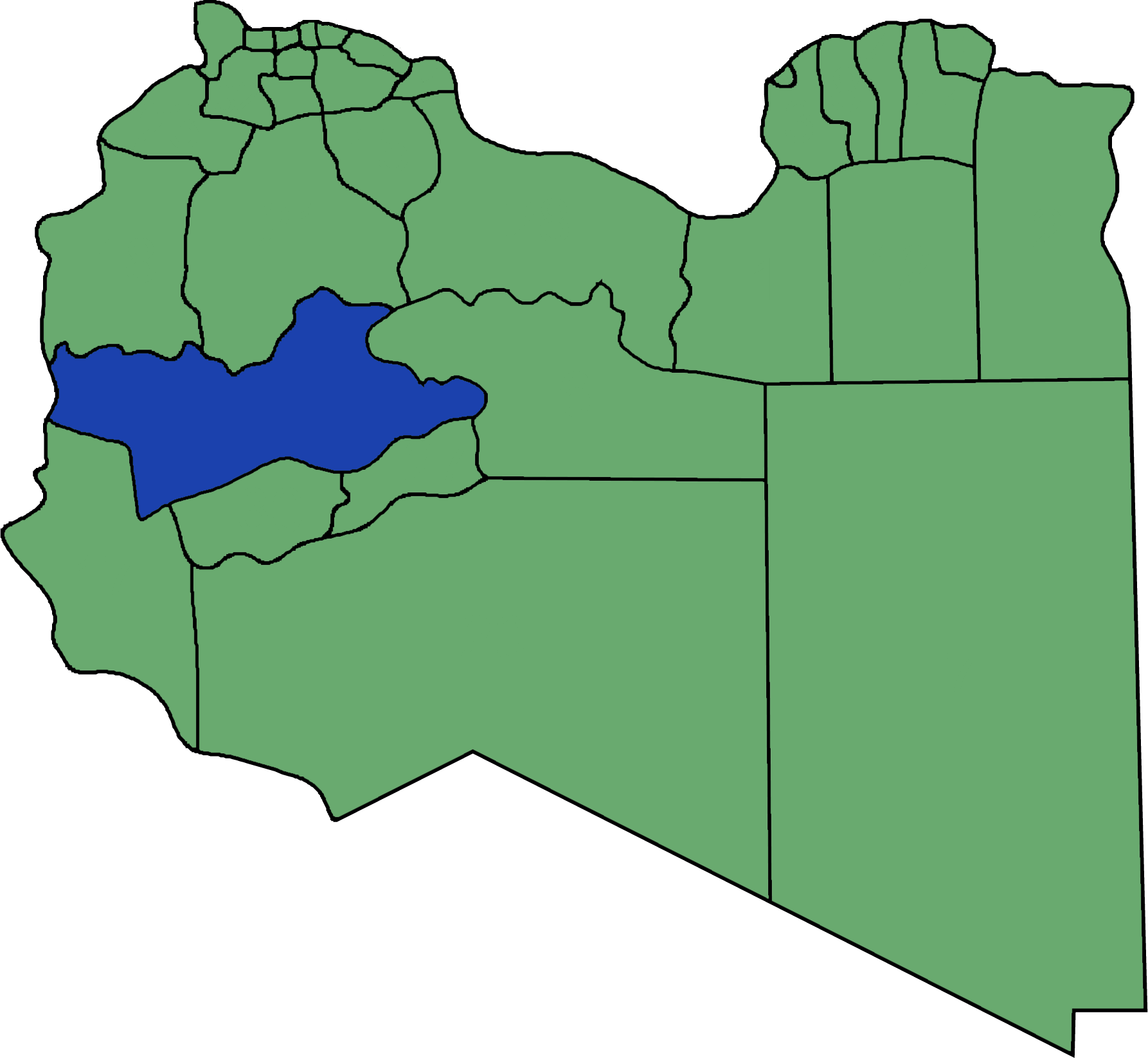
The same district between 2001 and 2007.

Per the census estimates of 2012, the total population in the region was 157,747 with 150,353 Libyans. The average size of the household in the country was 6.9, while the average household size of non-Libyans being 3.7. There were totally 22,713 households in the district, with 20,907 Libyan ones. The population density of the district was 1.86 persons per sq. km. Per 2006 census, there were totally 31,238 economically active people in the district. There were 21,006 government employees, 2,667 employers, 9,548 first level workers and 000 second level workers. There were 7,106 workers in state administration, 2,875 in agriculture, animal husbandry and forestry, 3,048 in agriculture & hunting, 11,076 in education, 1,837 in private enterprises, 2,566 in health & social work, 1,535 in production, 9,785 in technical work and 058 service workers. The total enrollment in schools was 25,404 and the number of people above secondary stage and less than graduation was 1,274. As per the report from World Health Organization (WHO), there were no communicable disease centres, two dental clinics, one general clinics, six out-patient clinics, 29 pharmacies, 65 PHC centres, two rural clinics and no specialized clinics.

== Economy ==
In 1943, very large, but low grade, sedimentary iron-ore deposits were discovered in the Wadi al Shatii District near Brak. Economically, it is only suitable for strip mining. There are also potential economic manganese deposits in the same area. The manganese occurs in lens or veinlets (up to 23% Mn) in the sandstones associated with the iron ore.
