= Nalut District =

District of Libya

Coordinates: 31°50′00″N 11°20′00″E

Nalut نالوت
- District
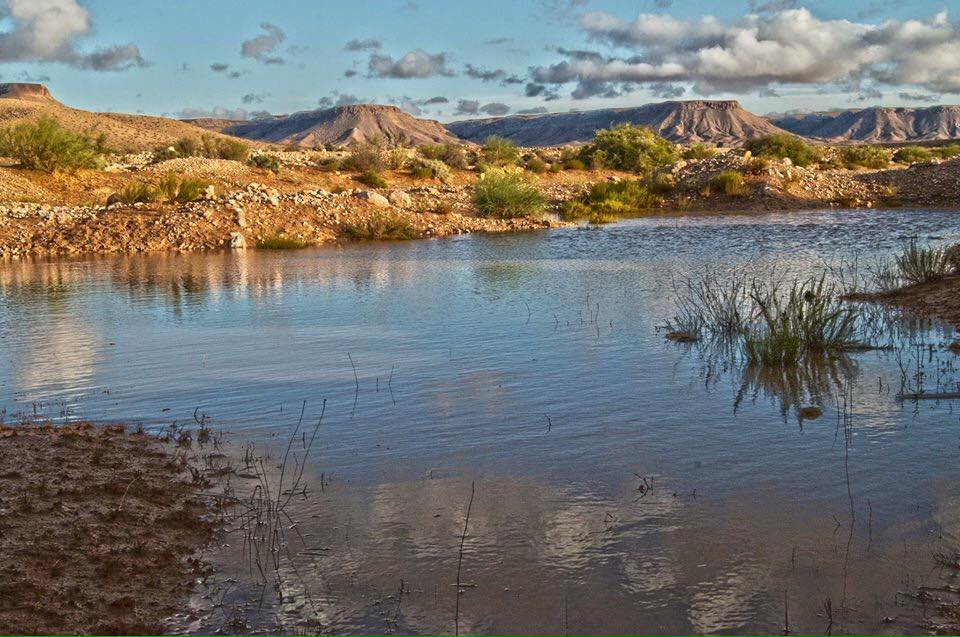

- Map of Libya with Nalut district highlighted
- Country: Libya
- Capital: Nalut

Population (2006)
  - Total: 93,224
- License Plate Code: 17, 19, 37, 48, 57

Nalut (Arabic: نالوت Nālūt) is one of the districts of Libya located in the country's north-west. Its capital is the city of Nalut. The second most notable city is Ghadames. To the north and west, Nalut district borders Tunisia (Medenine and Tataouine Governatorates) and Algeria. Domestically, it borders Nuqat al Khams - northeast, Jabal al Gharbi in the east, and Wadi al Shatii in the south. In 2007, Nalut District was enlarged to include the Ghadames District, while the eastern part of the former Nalut was moved to Jabal al Gharbi.

Per the census of 2012, the total population in the region was 157,747 and the average size of household in the country was 6.9. There were a total of 22,713 households in the district, with 20,907 Libyan ones. The population density of the district was 1.86 persons per km^{2}.

== Geography ==
Nalut District is located in the north western part of Libya, called Tripolitania. Most of the country has a flat undulating plain and occasional plateau, with an average elevation of around 423 m (1,388 ft). Around 91 per cent of the land is covered by desert, with only 8.8 per cent agricultural land (with only 1% arable lands) and 0.1 per cent of forests. The major resources are petroleum, gypsum and natural gas. Along the coastal regions, the climate is Mediterranean in coastal areas, while it is desert climate in all other parts. Dust storms lasting four to eight days are pretty common during Spring. Triplotania is the northwest region, while Cyrenacia is in the east and Fezzen in southwest. Triplotania runs from north to south and has a set of coastal oases, plains, and limestone plateaus with an elevation of 2,000 ft (610 m) to 3,000 ft (910 m). The region receives an annual rainfall of 16 in (410 mm). There are no perennial rivers in the region, but the region is abundant with groundwater aquifers.

== Demographics ==
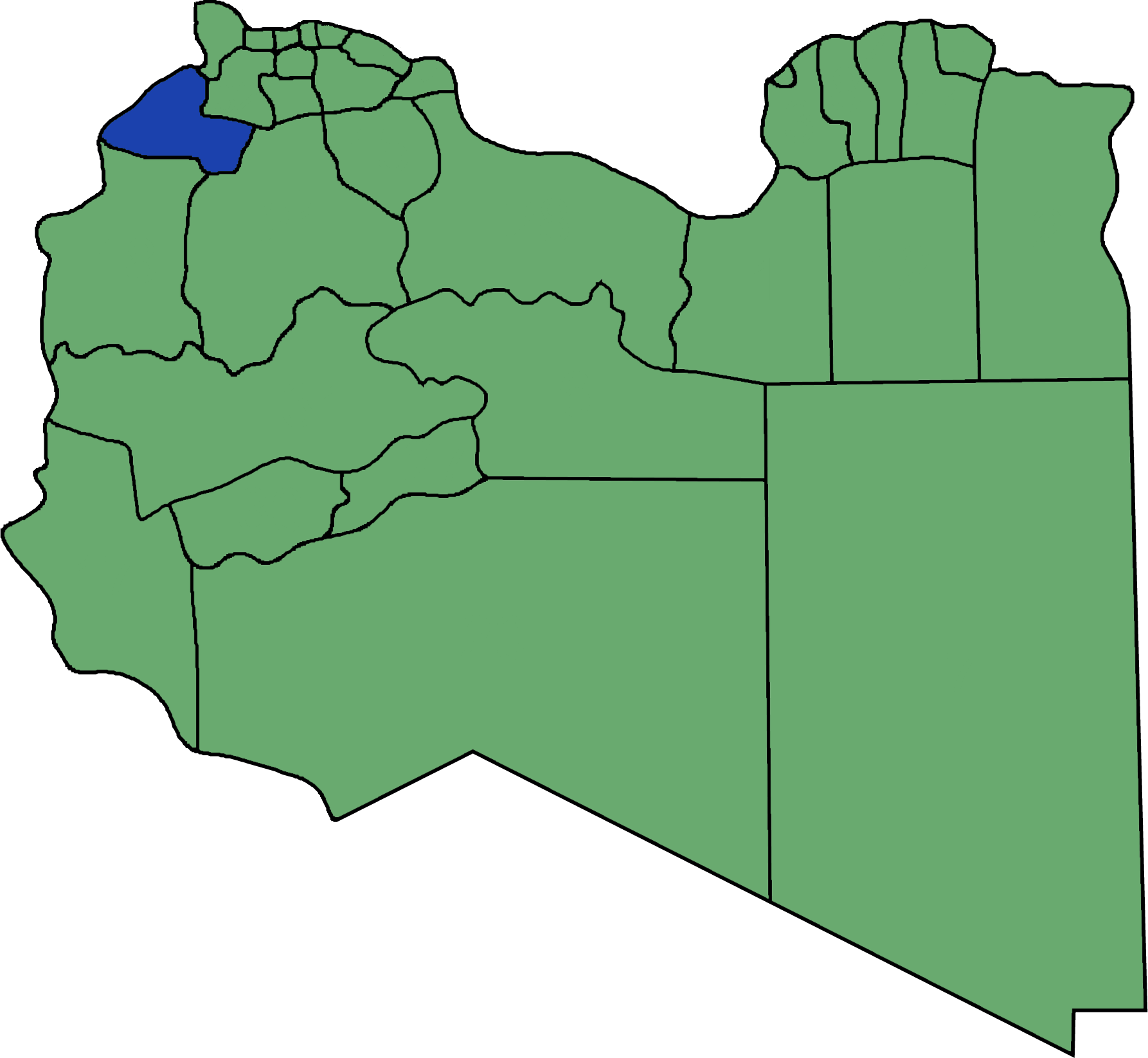
Pre-2007 extent of Nalut District

Per the census of 2012, the total population in the region was 157,747 with 150,353 Libyans. The average size of the households in the country was 6.9, while the average household size of non-Libyans was 3.7. There were totally 22,713 households in the district, with 20,907 Libyan ones. The population density of the district was 1.86 persons per km^{2}. Per the 2006 census, there were totally 35,830 economically active people in the district. There were 21,584 government employees, 4,153 employers, 10,565 first level workers and 000 second level workers. There were 8,788 workers in state administration, 4,345 in agriculture, animal husbandry and forestry, 4,576 in agriculture & hunting, 10,240 in education, 2,429 in private enterprises, 2,121 in health & social work, 2,795 in production, 9,494 in technical work and 203 service workers. The total enrollment in schools was 30,033 and the number of people above secondary stage and less than graduation was 1,884. As per the report from the World Health Organization (WHO), there were two communicable disease centres, two dental clinics, two general clinics, no in-patient clinics, two out-patient clinics, 20 pharmacies, 43 PHC centres, three rural clinics and zero specialized clinics.

== Administration ==
In 2007, Nalut District was enlarged to include what had been the Ghadames District, while the eastern part of the former Nalut was moved to Jabal al Gharbi. Libya became independent in 1951 from the colonial empire and is generally known for its oil rich resources. As a part of decentralization in 2012, the country was administratively split into 13 regions from the original 25 municipalities, which were further divided into 1,500 communes. Local governmental institutions manage the administration of education, industry, and communities.
