= Jabal al Gharbi District =

District of Libya

Coordinates: 31.75°N 12.5°E

Jabal al Gharbi الجبل الغربي
- District
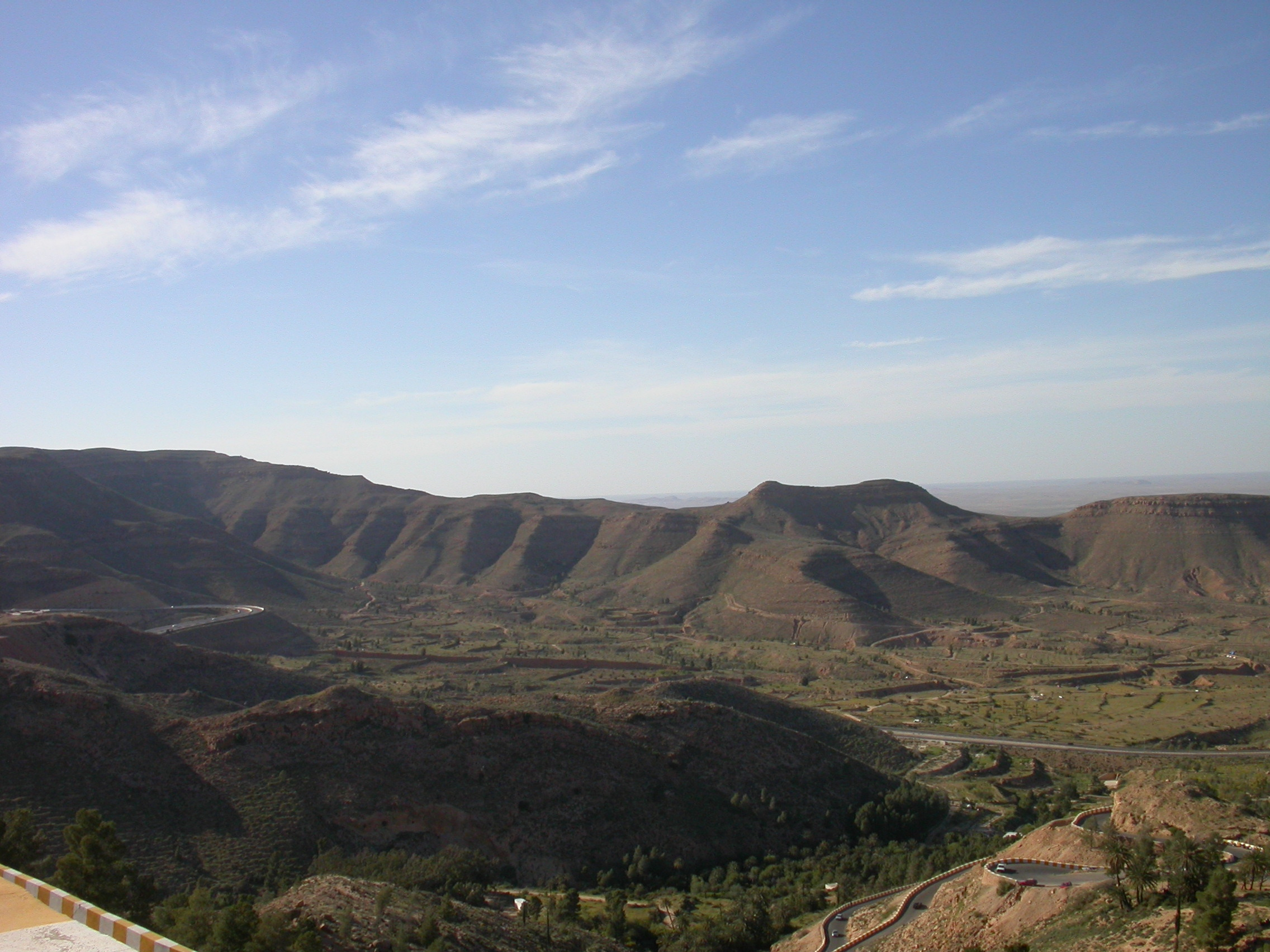

- Map of Libya with Jabal al Gharbi district highlighted
- Country: Libya
- Capital: Gharyan

Population (2006)
  - Total: 304,159
- License Plate Code: 21, 22, 38, 42, 43, 50, 53, 54, 56, 59, 64, 65

Jabal al Gharbi (Arabic: الجبل الغربي, romanized: Al Ǧabal al Gharbi, lit. 'The Western Mountain') is one of the districts of Libya. It is named after the Nafusa Mountains. It was formed in 2007 from the former districts of Yafran, Gharyan and Mizda. From 1995 to 1998, Jabal al Gharbi also existed as a Baladiyah or municipality. Jabal al Gharbi borders Sirte and Misrata to the east, Murqub to the northeast, Tripoli, Jafara and Zawiya to the north, Nuqat al Khams to the northwest, Nalut to the west, Wadi al Shatii to the south and Jufra to the southeast.

Per the census of 2012, the total population in the region was 157,747 with 150,353 Libyans. The average size of the household in the country was 6.9, while the average household size of non-Libyans being 3.7. There were totally 22,713 households in the district, with 20,907 Libyan ones. The population density of the district was 1.86 persons per km^{2}. Per 2006 census, there were totally 104,584 economically active people in the district.

== Geography ==
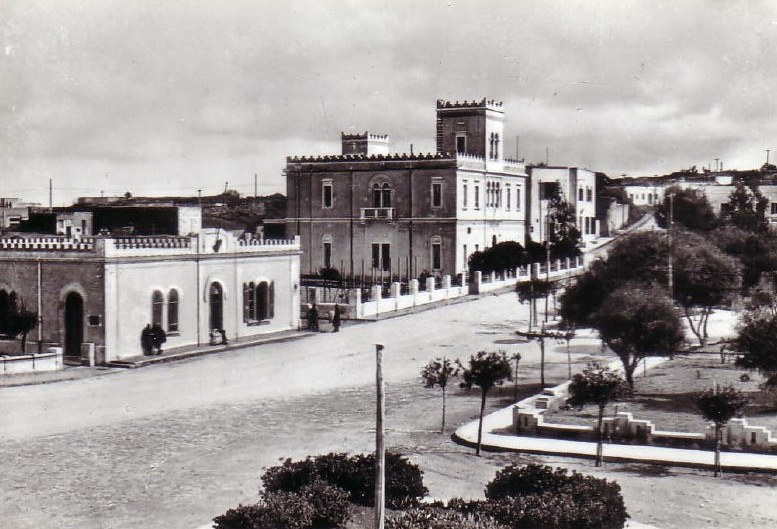
Gharyan, old town

Libya has mostly a flat undulating plain and occasional plateau, with an average elevation of around 423 m (1,388 ft). Around 91 per cent of the land is covered by desert, with only 8.8 per cent agricultural land (with only 1% arable lands) and 0.1 per cent of forests. The major resources are petroleum, gypsum and natural gas. Along the coastal regions, the climate is Mediterranean in coastal areas, while it is desert climate in all other parts. Dust storms lasting four to eight days is pretty common during Spring. Tripolitania is the northwest region, while it is Cyrenaica in the east and Fezzan in southwest. Tripolitania runs from north to south and has set of coastal oases, plains and limestone plateaus having an elevation of 2,000 ft (610 m) to 3,000 ft (910 m). The region receives an annual rainfall of 16 in (410 mm). There are no perennial rivers in the region, but the region is abundant with groundwater aquifers. Most of the major cities of Libya are located in the coastal regions.

== Demographics ==
Per the census of 2012, the total population in the region was 157,747 with 150,353 Libyans. The average size of the household in the country was 6.9, while the average household size of non-Libyans being 3.7. There were totally 22,713 households in the district, with 20,907 Libyan ones. The population density of the district was 1.86 persons per km^{2}. Per 2006 census, there were totally 104,584 economically active people in the district. There were 55,257 government employees, 9,638 employers, 36,074 first level workers and 008 second level workers. There were 18,322 workers in state administration, 10,413 in agriculture, animal husbandry and forestry, 11,065 in agriculture & hunting, 31,371 in education, 8,390 in private enterprises, 4,344 in health & social work, 7,725 in production, 30,421 in technical work and 1,221 service workers. The total enrollment in schools was 98,685 and the number of people above secondary stage and less than graduation was 5,002. As per the report from World Health Organization (WHO), there were 1 communicable disease centres, 4 dental clinics, 1 general clinics, 0 in-patient clinics, 11 out-patient clinics, 42 pharmacies, 58 PHC centres, 3 polyclinics, 2 rural clinics and 1 specialized clinics. Islam is the state religion and major religion in the district.
