= Baladiyat of Libya =

Second-level administrative divisions of Libya

The Baladiyah (singular), or baladiyat (plural), is the intended second-level administration subdivision of Libya being reintroduced in 2012 by the General National Congress with Law 59 on the system of local administration, dividing the country into governorates (muhafazat) and districts (baladiyat), with baladiyah having local councils. As the proposed governorates have not been created, the 22 districts continue to serve as the primary administrative divisions of Libya.

Baladiyah is an Arabic word used in many Arab countries to denote administrative divisions of a country.

== History ==
Baladiyat were first introduced in Libya in 1983 to replace the governorate system. The ten existing governorates were replaced with forty-six baladiyat, but in 1988 that number was reduced to twenty-five baladiyat. In 1995 they were replaced by shabiyat. For Libya, the baladiyat are usually known in English as "districts" and sometimes as "municipalities", but the municipal level under the baladiyat and subsequent shabiyat systems was the Basic People's Congress. After the fall of Gaddafi and the transfer of government from the interim National Transitional Council to the elected General National Congress, the previous shabiyat and Basic People's Congress system was deemed inappropriate, and a revised system was authorized with governorates (muhafazat) as the primary division and districts (baladiyat) as their subdivision, with baladiyat having local councils. This was implemented in part by the Council of Ministers with resolution No. 180 in July 2013, creating the baladiyah. There were originally ninety-nine baladiyat listed for Libya, but by March 2015 that number had grown to 108. The first-level administration subdivisions, the governorates (muhafazat), have yet to be created due to a vested interest in maintaining decentralized governance, and the continuing civil war.

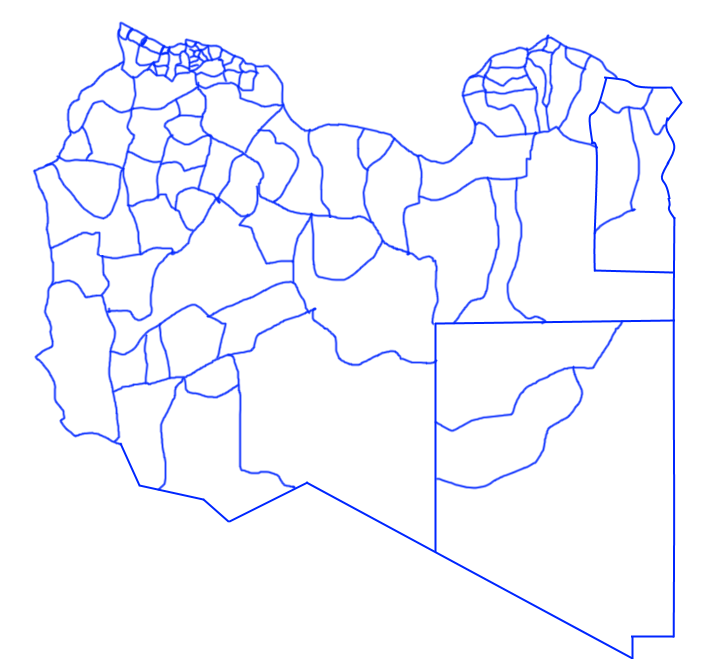
The baladyat of libya map

== 1988 ==
Map showing subdivision of former governorates into the 25 baladiya

The table hereunder lists the old twenty-five baladiyat in alphabetical order with a link to each one and numbered to be located on the map. Note that each district linked may be both a baladiyah and a shabiyah. The many changes may not always be reflected in the linked article.

Number	Name	Region
1	Ajdabiya	Cyrenaica
2	‘Aziziya	Tripolitania
3	Butnan	Cyrenaica
4	Fati	Cyrenaica
5	Jabal al Akhdar	Cyrenaica
6	Jufra	Fezzan
7	Khoms	Tripolitania
8	Kufra	Cyrenaica
9	Nuqat al Khams	Tripolitania
10	Wadi al Shatii	Fezzan
11	Ubari	Fezzan
12	Zawiya	Tripolitania
13	Benghazi	Cyrenaica
14	Derna	Cyrenaica
15	Ghadames	Tripolitania
16	Gharyan	Tripolitania
17	Misrata	Tripolitania
18	Murzuq	Fezzan
19	Sabha	Fezzan
20	Sawfajjin	Tripolitania
21	Sirte	Tripolitania
22	Tripoli	Tripolitania
23	Tarhuna	Tripolitania
24	Yafran	Tripolitania
25	Zlitan	Tripolitania

== 2013 ==
Below is a list of the 99 baladiyat in Libya as created July 2013.

Number	Name	District	Region
1	Tobruk	Butnan (Capital)	Cyrenaica
2	Musaid	Butnan	Cyrenaica
3	Jaghbub	Butnan	Cyrenaica
4	Derna	Derna (Capital)	Cyrenaica
5	Al Qubah	Qubah (Capital)	Cyrenaica
6	Abraq	Derna	Cyrenaica
7	Bayda	Jebel Akhdar (Capital)	Cyrenaica
8	Cyrene	Jebel Akhdar	Cyrenaica
9	Sahel El-Jebel	Jebel Akhdar	Cyrenaica
10	Umm al Rizam	Derna	Cyrenaica
11	Marj	Marj (Capital)	Cyrenaica
12	Jardas al ‘Abid	Marj	Cyrenaica
13	Tocra	Marj	Cyrenaica
14	Abyar	Marj	Cyrenaica
15	Qaminis	Benghazi	Cyrenaica
16	Suluq	Benghazi	Cyrenaica
17	Benghazi	Benghazi (Capital)	Cyrenaica (Historical Capital)
18	Ajdabiya	Al Wahat (Capital)	Cyrenaica
19	Brega	Al Wahat	Cyrenaica
20	Kufra	Kufra (Capital)	Cyrenaica
21	Tazirbu	Kufra	Cyrenaica
22	Awjila	Al Wahat	Cyrenaica
23	Jikharra	Al Wahat	Cyrenaica
24	Jalu	Al Wahat	Cyrenaica
25	Marada	Al Wahat	Cyrenaica
26	Gulf of Sidra	Sirte	Tripolitania
27	Sirte	Sirte (Capital)	Tripolitania
28	Zamzam	Sirte	Tripolitania
29	Hun	Jufra (Capital)	Fezzan
30	Shatii Shargi	Wadi Shatii	Fezzan
31	Shatii Garbi	Wadi Shatii	Fezzan
32	Sebha	Sebha (Capital)	Fezzan (Historical Capital)
33	Murzuk	Murzuk (Capital)	Fezzan
34	Eshargia	Murzuk	Fezzan
35	Wadi Utba	Wadi Shatii	Fezzan
36	Traghan	Murzuk	Fezzan
37	Ubari	Wadi al Hayaa District (Capital)	Fezzan
38	Ghat	Ghat (Capital)	Fezzan
39	Bent Bayeh	Wadi al Hayaa District	Fezzan
40	Misurata	Misurata (Capital)	Tripolitania
41	Zliten	Murqub	Tripolitania
42	Al Khums	Murqub (Capital)	Tripolitania
43	Essahl	Murqub	Tripolitania
44	Qasr Khiar	Murqub	Tripolitania
45	Msallata	Murqub	Tripolitania
46	Tarhuna	Murqub	Tripolitania
47	Bani Walid	Misurata	Tripolitania
48	Castelverde	Tripoli	Tripolitania
49	Tajura	Tripoli	Tripolitania
50	Tripoli (Capital of Libya)	Tripoli (Capital)	Tripolitania (Historical Capital)
51	Suani	Tripoli	Tripolitania
52	Qasr bin Ghashir	Tripoli	Tripolitania
53	Janzur	Tripoli	Tripolitania
54	Andalus	Tripoli	Tripolitania
55	Wadi Rabie	Tripoli	Tripolitania
56	Abu Saleem	Tripoli	Tripolitania
57	Sbaiea	Tripoli	Tripolitania
58	Sidi Saeh	Tripoli	Tripolitania
59	Souq Elkhamis	Murqub	Tripolitania
60	Souq al Jum'aa	Tripoli	Tripolitania
61	‘Aziziya	Jafara (Capital)	Tripolitania
62	Zahra	Jafara	Tripolitania
63	Zawiya	Zawiya (Capital)	Tripolitania
64	Western Zawiya	Zawiya	Tripolitania
65	Al Maya	Zawiya	Tripolitania
66	Zuwarah	Nuqat al Khams	Tripolitania
67	Sabratha	Zawiya	Tripolitania
68	Sorman	Zawiya	Tripolitania
69	Jumayl	Nuqat al Khams (Capital)	Tripolitania
70	Zaltan	Nuqat al Khams	Tripolitania
71	Ajaylat	Nuqat al Khams	Tripolitania
72	Reqdalin	Nuqat al Khams	Tripolitania
73	Baten Eljabel	Nafusa Mountains	Tripolitania
74	Gharyan	Nafusa Mountains (Capital)	Tripolitania
75	Yafran	Nafusa Mountains	Tripolitania
76	Kikla	Nafusa Mountains	Tripolitania
77	Sorman	Nafusa Mountains	Tripolitania
78	Jadu	Nafusa Mountains	Tripolitania
79	Rhibat	Nafusa Mountains	Tripolitania
80	Ryaina	Nafusa Mountains	Tripolitania
81	Asbi'a	Nafusa Mountains	Tripolitania
82	Rijban	Nafusa Mountains	Tripolitania
83	Zintan	Nafusa Mountains	Tripolitania
84	Dahr Eljabal	Nafusa Mountains	Tripolitania
85	Haraba	Nafusa Mountains	Tripolitania
86	Nalut	Nalut (Capital)	Tripolitania
87	Wazzin	Nalut	Tripolitania
88	El Houamed	Nalut	Tripolitania
89	Kabaw	Nalut	Tripolitania
90	Nesma	Nalut	Tripolitania
91	Eshgiga	Murqub	Tripolitania
92	Ghadames	Nalut	Tripolitania
93	Qayqab	Derna	Cyrenaica
94	Bi'r al Ashhab	Butnan	Cyrenaica
95	Qatrun	Murzuk	Fezzan
96	Tawergha	Misurata	Tripolitania
97	Alghoraifa	Wadi al Ajal	Fezzan
98	Dawon	Murqub	Tripolitania
99	Elgurda	Wadi Shatii	Fezzan

== See also ==
- Provinces of Libya
- Governorates of Libya
