= List of cities in Libya =

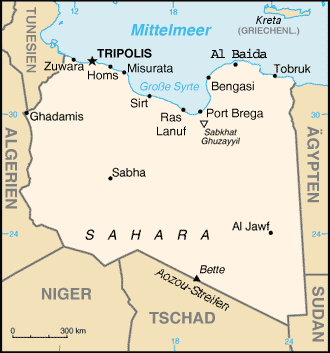
Map of Libya

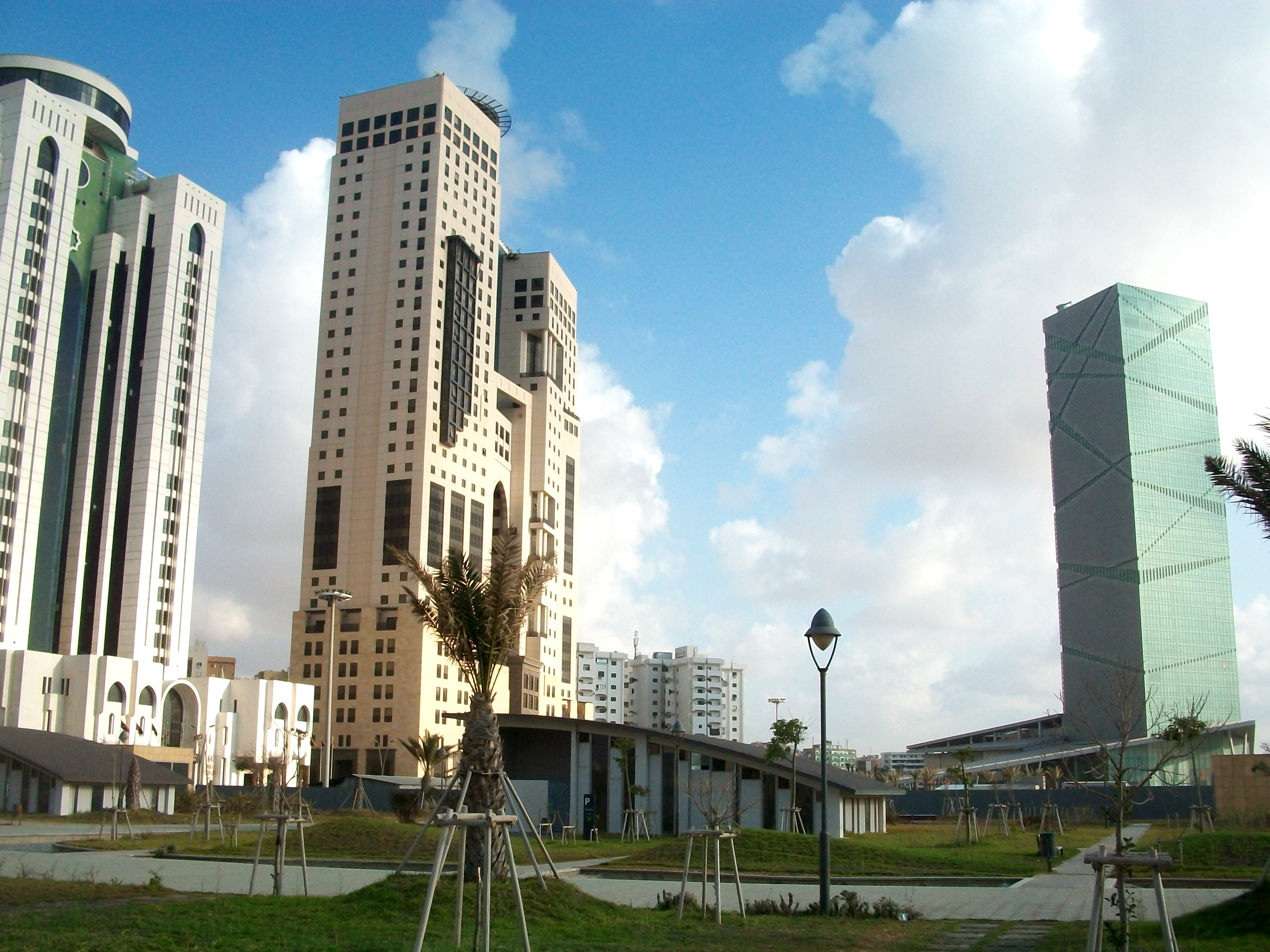
Tripoli, capital of Libya

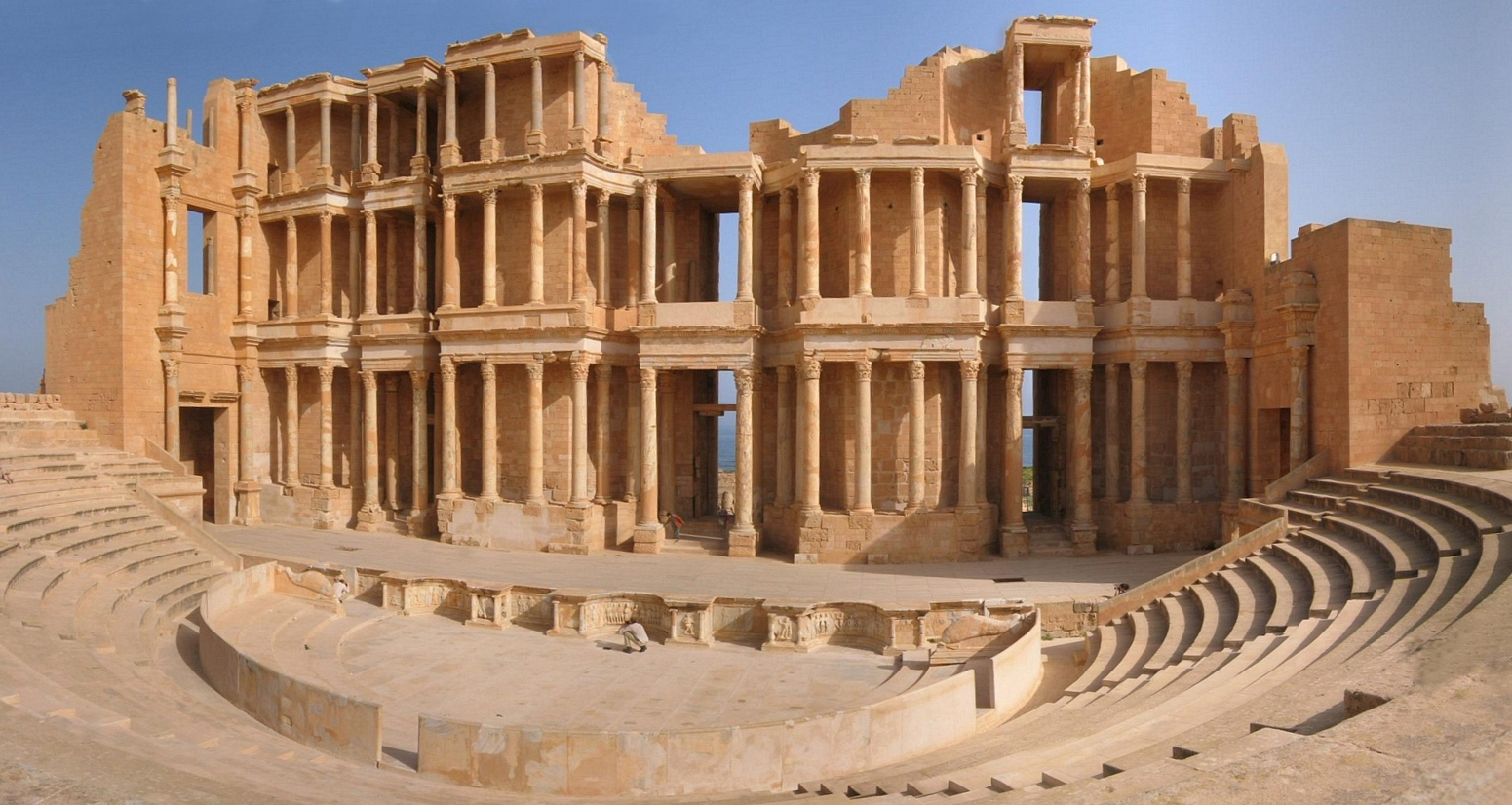
Sabratha

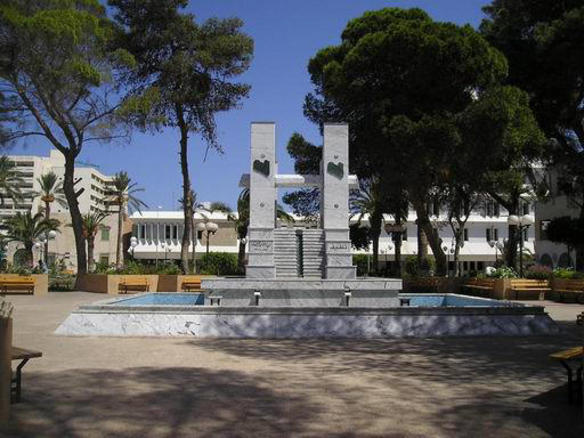
Misurata

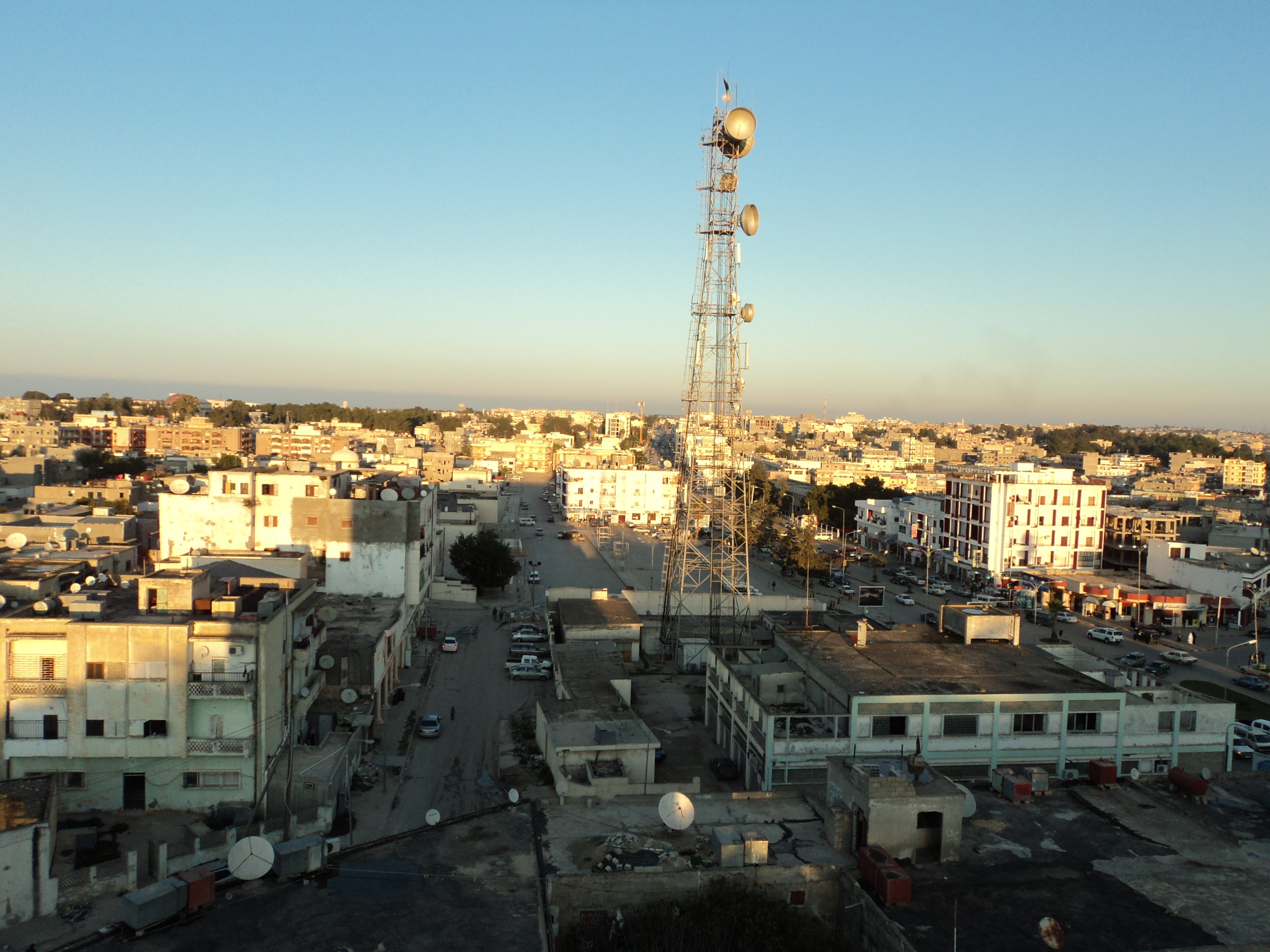
Bayda

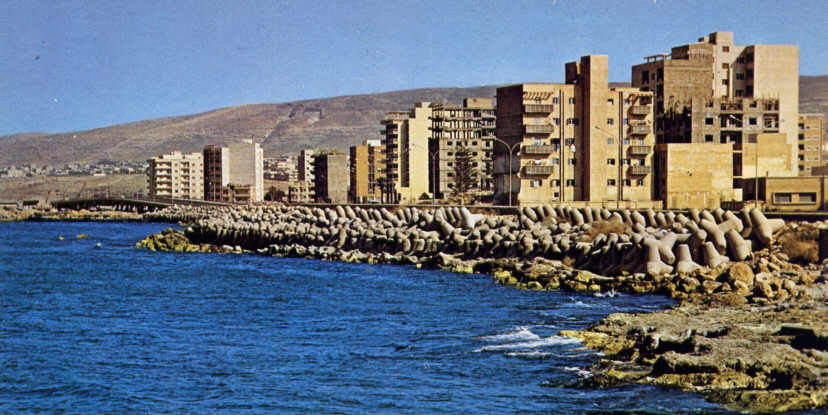
Derna

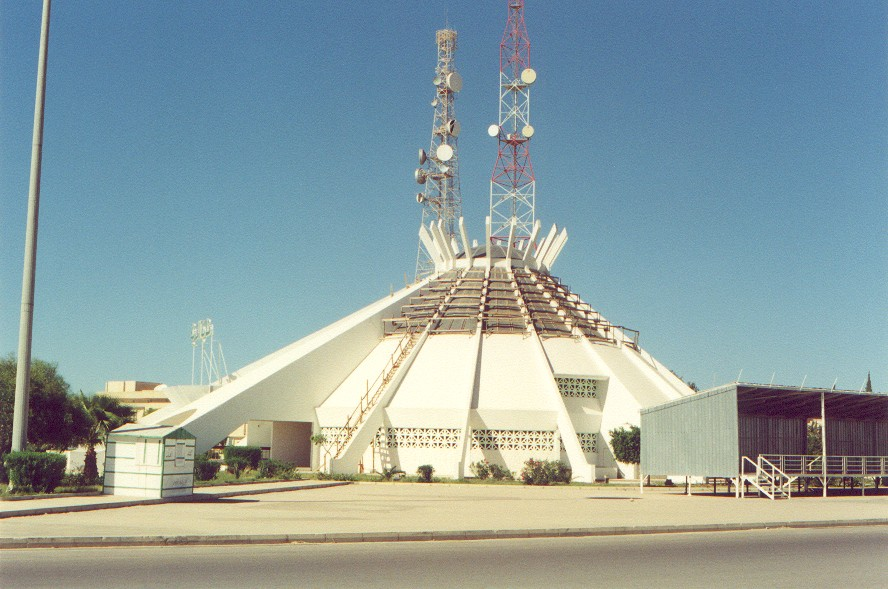
Sirte

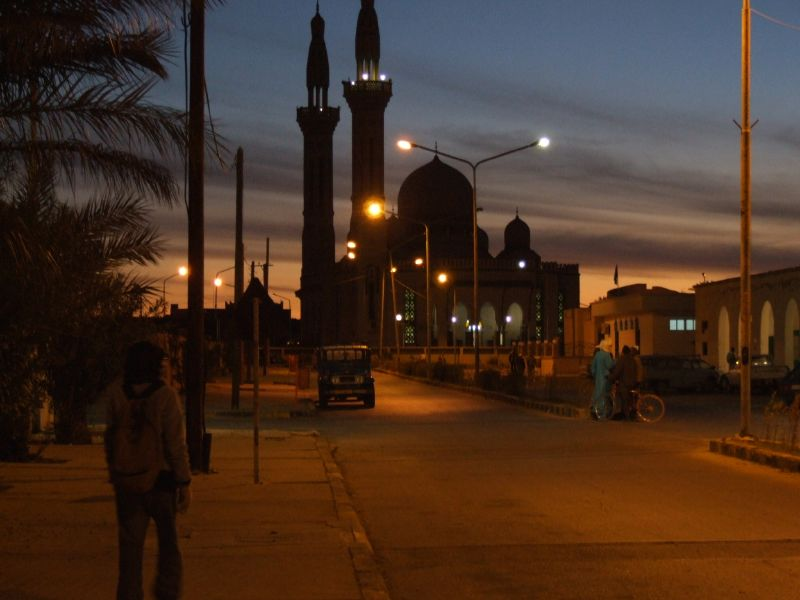
Ghadames

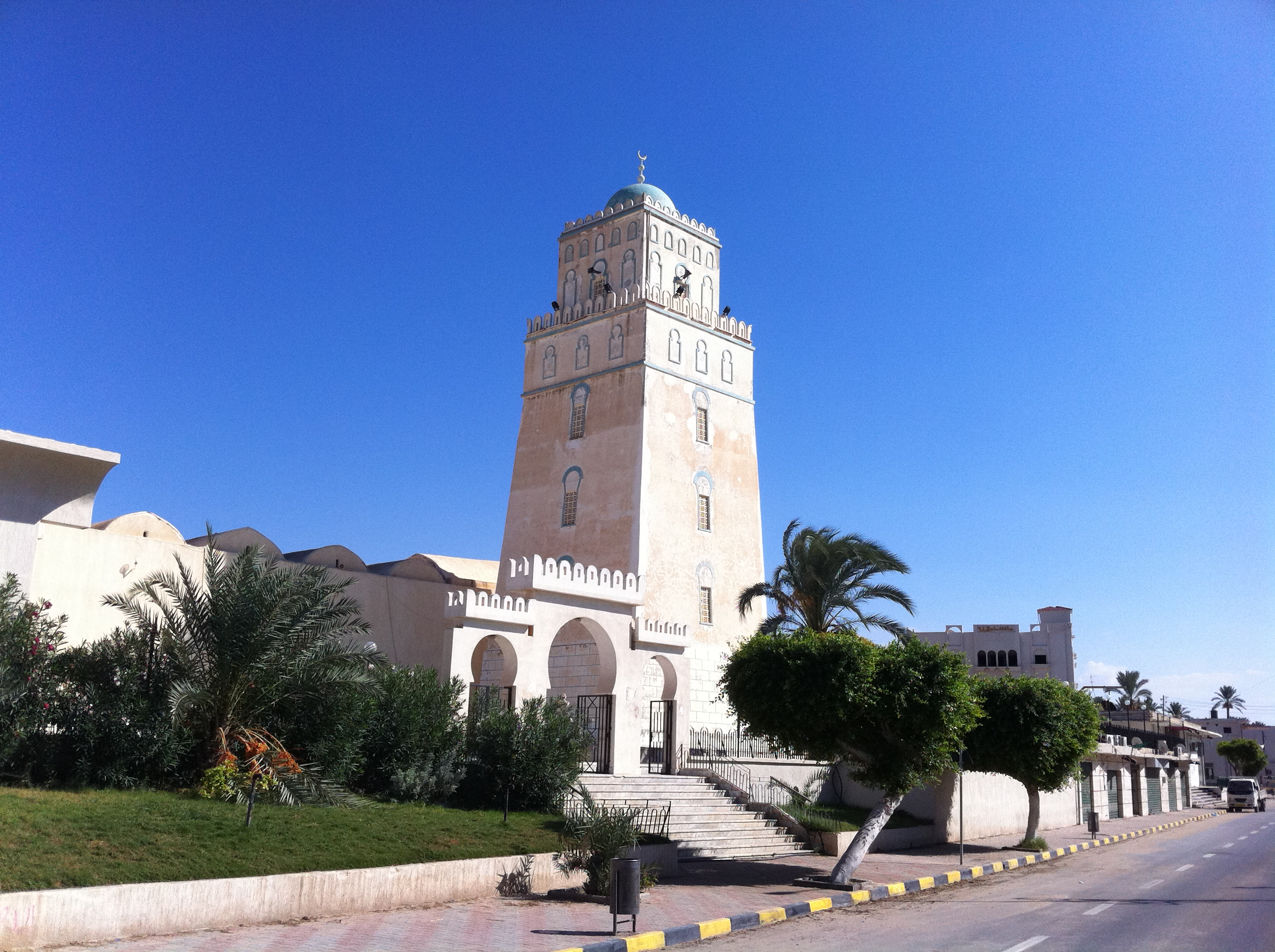
Tajura

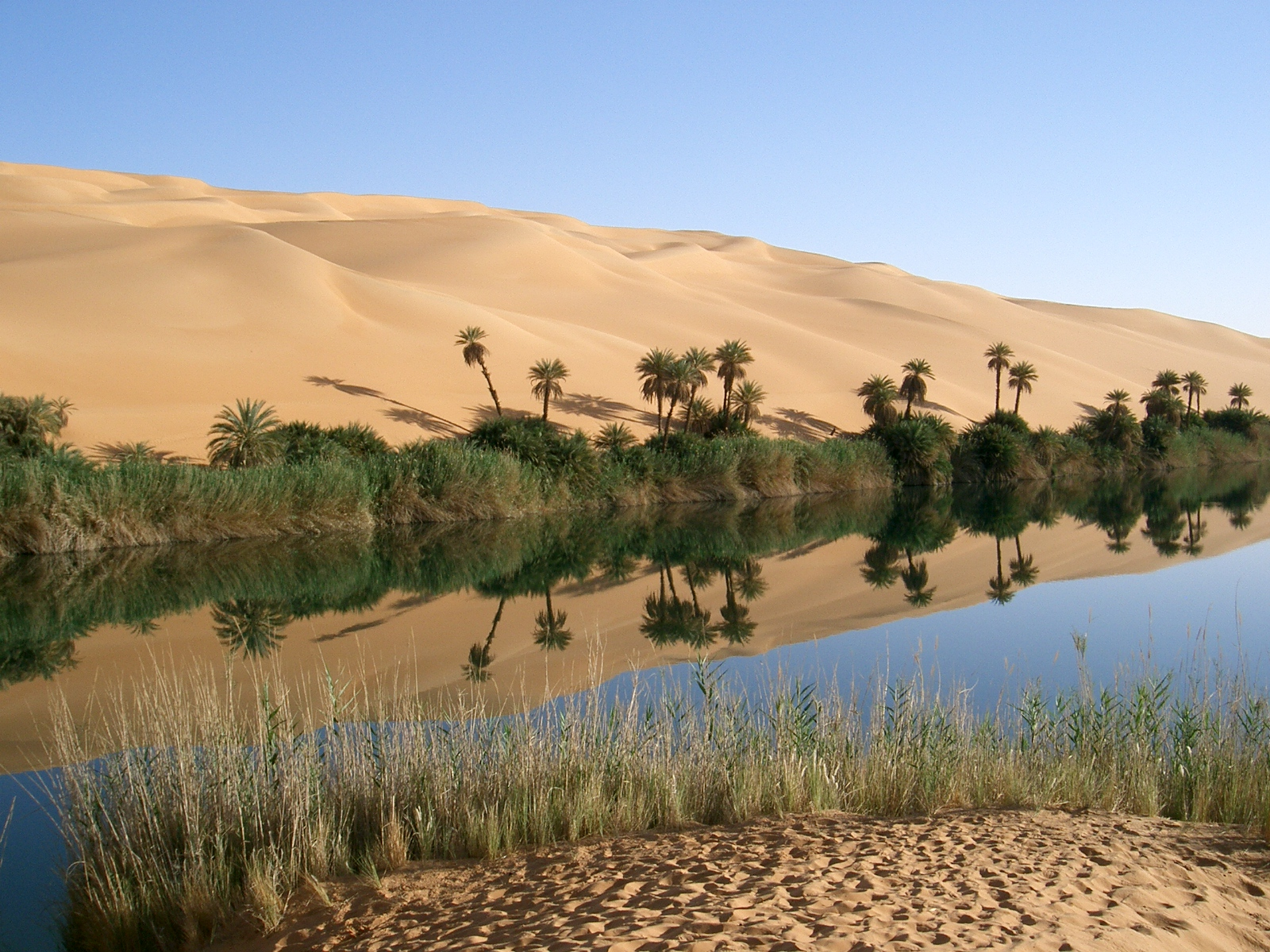
Ubari

This is a list of the 100 largest populated places in Libya. Some places in the list could be considered suburbs or neighborhoods of some large cities in the list, so this list is not definitive. Nearly all major cities in Libya are located on the northern coast, due to its more mild climate compared to the deserts of the interior.

No.	City	Population
1	Tripoli / طرابلس	1,317,009
2	Benghazi / بنغازي	821,787
3	Misrata / مصراتة	391,167 (2022)
4	Bayda / البيضاء	245,518
5	Zawiya / الزاوية	234,000
6	Gharyan / غريان	187,000
7	Tobruk / طبرق	172,500
8	Ajdabiya / اجدابيا	160,200
9	Zliten / زليتن	350,000
10	Derna / درنة	150,000
11	Sirte / سرت	128,123
12	Sabha / سبها	103,743
13	Khoms / الخمس	88,317
14	Bani Walid / بني وليد	85,425
15	Sabratha / صبراتة	80,000
16	Zuwara / زوارة	75,893
17	Kufra / الكفرة	68,940
18	Marj / المرج	62,894
19	Tocra / توكرة	60,681
20	Tarhuna / ترهونة	50,715
21	Msallata / مسلاتة	46,169
22	Jumayl / الجميل	39,344
23	Sorman / صرمان	36,707
24	Al Gseibat	32,559
25	Shahhat / شحات	28,818
26	Ubari / أوباري	27,796
27	Asbi'a / الأصابعة	27,693
28	Jadid	27,503
29	Waddan / ودان	27,000
30	El Agheila / العقيلة	26,813
31	Abyar / الأبيار	26,600
32	Nofaliya / النوفلية	25,997
33	Regdalin / رقدالين	25,831
34	Gasr Akhyar	25,261
35	Al Qubah / القبة	24,631
36	Tawergha / تاورغاء *	24,223
37	Al Maya	23,222
38	Murzuk / مرزق	22,395
39	Brega	21,715
40	Teghsat	21,642
41	Hun	19,816
42	Jalu	18,873
43	Ajaylat	18,277
44	Nalut	17,146
45	Suluq	16,999
46	Shuhada' al Buerat	16,282
47	Zaltan	15,801
48	Mizda	13,809
49	Ra's Lanuf	13,130
50	Al Urban	12,600
51	Yafran	12,372
52	Ar Rayaniya	12,263
53	Umm al Rizam	12,098
54	Taucheira	11,723
55	Brak	11,638
56	Abu Ghlasha	11,179
57	Ad Dawoon	10,909
58	Teji	10,828
59	Qaminis	10,713
60	Qatrun	10,650
61	Benina	10,522
62	Kikla	10,350
63	Al Rheibat	10,080
64	Sokna	9,887
65	Massa	9,748
66	Bin Jawad	9,675
67	Umm al Aranib	9,655
68	Jadu	9,653
69	Ghadames	9,558
70	Ar Rabta	9,487
71	Ghat	9,228
72	Al Abraq	8,861
73	Sidi as Said	8,836
74	Ar Rajban	8,820
75	Awjila	8,515
76	Ras al Hamam	8,397
77	Tolmeita	8,310
78	Zella	8,202
79	Wadi Utba	8,178
80	Al Barkat	8,130
81	Martuba	8,130
82	Traghan	7,510
83	Al Hashan	7,494
84	El Bayyada	7,432
85	Qayqab	7,297
86	Mashashita	7,255
87	Bu-Fakhra	7,142
88	Musaid	7,139
89	Tacnis	7,038
90	Susa	7,038
91	Wadi Zem-Zem	6,799
92	Batta	6,754
93	Tazirbu	6,600
94	Jadid	6,598
95	Farzougha	6,564
96	Qaryat ‘Umar al Mukhtar	6,521
97	Bi'r al Ashhab	6,399

Source:Amraja M. el Khajkhaj, "Noumou al Mudon as Sagheera fi Libia", Dar as Saqia, Benghazi-2008, pp. 118-123.

== See also ==
- Transliteration of Libyan placenames
- List of metropolitan areas in Africa
- List of largest cities in the Arab world
