= Qayqab =

Qayqab القيقب
- Town
- Location in Libya
- Coordinates: 32°43′32″N 22°01′18″E
- Country: Libya
- Region: Cyrenaica
- District: Derna

Population (2006)
  - Total: 7,297
- Time zone: UTC+2 (EET)

Qayqab (also Ghoigah, Minţaqat al Qayqab, El-Ghégab, El Gaigab, El Gheighab) is a town in the Derna District in northeastern Libya. The town is located on the northeast side of the Akhdar Mountains, south of Al Abraq and Al Abraq Airport and Faydiya lies to the southwest, connected by road.

== History ==
Qayqab was an ancient village, being identified with the Roman Agabis. It was a market village where goods from the coast were traded for animals and other products provided by the Cyrenaican herdering nomads. The village was the site of an Ottoman fort or citadel built in 1852 by Abu Bakr Bu Hadus, chief of the Bara'sa tribe.

The town grew from the village in the 1970s when the government used oil money to supply housing for the herding nomads of the area.

Prior to the 2007 administrative reorganization, Al Qayqab was part of Al Qubah District.

The name Qayqab translates in Arabic to "maple tree."

== See also ==
- List of cities in Libya
