= Firsilla =

- Village
- Location in Libya
- Coordinates: 32°41′55″N 22°15′25″E
- Country: Libya
- District: Derna
- Time zone: UTC+2 (EET)

Firsilla (Farsillah) is a village in Derna District in northeastern Libya. The village located on the east side of the Akhdar Mountains. The village of Firsilla formed around a spring of the same name.

Prior to the 2007 reorganization, Firsilla was part of Al Qubah District.
