= Quba District =

Quba District may refer to:

- Quba District (Azerbaijan)
- Quba District (Libya)
