= Gasr el Jadi =

Village in Butnan district, Libya

Gasr el Jadi قصر الجدي
- Village
- Location in Libya
- Coordinates: 31°51′5″N 24°47′25″E
- Country: Libya
- Region: Cyrenaica
- District: Butnan
- Time zone: UTC+2 (EET)

Gasr el Jadi, Qasr al Jadi, or Gasr el Gedi (Arabic: قصر الجدي) is a small village located at Cyrenaica in eastern Libya, near Bardia.
