= Al Urban =

Al Urban may refer to:

- Al Urban (photographer)
- Al Urban (musician), a rockabilly musician
- Al-ʽUrban, a town in Libya
