= Rudolf Sinner =

German World War II flying ace

- Born: 30 December 1915; Austria
- Military career
- Allegiance: Nazi Germany (to 1945)
- Branch: Luftwaffe
- Service years: 1937–1945
- Rank: Major (major)
- Nickname: Rudi
- Units: Jagdgeschwader 3 Jagdgeschwader 27; Jagdgeschwader 54; Jagdgeschwader 7
- Awards: German Cross in Gold
- Other work: Fire-safety engineer

Rudolf Sinner (30 December 1915 – unknown) was an Austrian-born fighter of the Luftwaffe during World War II. He claimed 40 aerial victories within 305 missions, including four victories while flying the Me-262.

== Military career ==
Born in 1915, Rudolf Sinner got educated at the University of Innsbruck and the University of Vienna.

At the age of 21, he was drafted into the Austrian Federal Army and trained in the mountain artillery. During the Polish campaign, he served in a horse-drawn flak unit before being transferred to fighter pilot duty in 1940. He absolved his pilot training in Vienna.

Following his training he flew with JG3 on the western front and was then transferred to Jagdgeschwader 27 in North Africa. He was assigned to 2./JG27. On 12 October 1941 he scored his first victory. On 4 June 1942, Sinner was appointed Staffelkapitän of 6. Staffel of JG 27. He succeeded Oberleutnant Emmerich Fluder who had been killed in action on 31 May. He claimed his 30th victory on 3 September 1942.

=== Group commander ===
On 1 June 1943, Sinner was appointed as Gruppenkommandeur (group commander) of newly formed IV. Gruppe of JG 27 based at Kalamaki, Greece. In consequence, command of 6. Staffel of JG 27 was passed on to Oberleutnant Willy Kientsch. On 14 September 1943, Sinner was transferred to take command of IV. Gruppe of Jagdgeschwader 54 (JG 54—54th Fighter Wing) which was based on the Eastern Front. He succeeded Hauptmann Erich Rudorffer who had been transferred on 1 August. Intermittently, the Gruppe had been led by Oberleutnant Alfred Teumer and Oberleutnant Siguurd Hala.

On 11 February 1944, Sinner and Hauptmann Siegfried Schnell, the commander of III. Gruppe of JG 54, exchanged roles with Sinner taking command of III. Gruppe on the Western Front and Schnell leading IV. Gruppe in the east. On 6 March, Sinner managed to shoot down a B-17 bomber, but got wounded in the process and had to bail out near Bassum, southerly of Bremen. After his recovery, on 12 June 1944 he got assigned to I./JG27 to the invasion front in France.

With his current total victories at 36, Sinner was transferred to III./JG7, on 1 January 1945. He would add four more victories to his total, including two B-24 bomber.

On 4 April 1945, Sinner led a formation of seven ME-262s off from Rechlin. Shortly after emerging from the clouds the aircraft were attacked by P-51 Mustangs of the USAAF's 339th Fighter Group. In the ensuing combat, Sinner's aircraft was hit. He bailed out at low altitude, with badly burned face and hands. His parachute deployed only partially and he struck the ground heavily before getting dragged into a barbed-wire fence. Sinner later reported that the P-51s attempted to strafe him, but he feigned death till they withdrew. His injuries were severe enough to keep him out of the rest of the war.

== Later life ==
After the war he worked as a fire-safety engineer in a chemical works in Linz/ Donau, Austria.

== Summary of career ==
=== Aerial victory claims ===
Mathews and Foreman, authors of Luftwaffe Aces — Biographies and Victory Claims, researched the German Federal Archives and found records for 40 aerial victory claims plus one further unconfirmed claim. This figure includes three claims on the Eastern Front and 37 in the western theatre of operations, including three heavy bombers. He claimed four victories flying the Me 262.

Chronicle of aerial victories
This and the – (dash) indicates unwitnessed aerial victory claims for which Sinner did not receive credit.
Claim	Date	Time	Type	Location	Claim	Date	Time	Type	Location
– 2. Staffel of Jagdgeschwader 27 – In North Africa — October 1941 – April 1942
1	12 October 1941	09:05	P-40	Sidi Omar	4	23 February 1942	15:23	P-40	southeast of Umm al Rizam
2	17 December 1941	11:10	Hurricane	southeast of Martuba	5	23 February 1942	15:25	P-40	southeast of Umm al Rizam
3	13 February 1942	09:23	Hurricane	east-southeast of Tobruk					
– Stab I. Gruppe of Jagdgeschwader 27 – In North Africa — May 1942
6	30 May 1942	14:05	P-40	Bir-el-Harmat					
– 6. Staffel of Jagdgeschwader 27 – In North Africa — 4 June – 6 December 1942
7	24 June 1942	10:00	Hurricane	20 km (12 mi) south of Bir el Tholata	21	28 July 1942	18:25	Hurricane	3 km (1.9 mi) east of Deir-el-Taqa
8	26 June 1942	18:40	Hurricane	southeast of Marsa Matrouh	22	3 August 1942	17:55	Hurricane	southeast of El Dabaa
9	10 July 1942	06:15	Hurricane	southwest of El Alamein	23	3 August 1942	18:00	Hurricane	Bir Ibrahim
10	13 July 1942	12:25	P-40	east-northeast of El Dakar	—	14 August 1942	06:25	P-40	northwest of El Alamein
11	17 July 1942	06:37	Spitfire	El Dakar	24	14 August 1942	06:30	P-40	northwest of El Alamein
12	17 July 1942	13:22	Hurricane	Haggag el Qasaba	25	27 August 1942	14:10	Hurricane	5 km (3.1 mi) northeast of Kharita
13	17 July 1942	13:27	Hurricane	south of Haggag el Qasaba	26	31 August 1942	10:30	Hurricane	3 km (1.9 mi) northwest Deir-el-Raghil
14	19 July 1942	09:15	Hurricane	Bir el Themta	27	31 August 1942	18:30	Spitfire	15 km (9.3 mi) south of Imayid
15	19 July 1942	09:19	Hurricane	south of El Alamein	28	1 September 1942	06:59	P-40	15 km (9.3 mi) east-northeast of Deir-el-Taqa
16	20 July 1942	11:19	Hurricane	3 km (1.9 mi) southeast of Bir-el-Khasa	29	1 September 1942	07:01	P-40	east of Deir-el-Taqa
17	21 July 1942	18:09	P-40	north of Bir-el-Harmat	30	3 September 1942	14:25	P-40	south of El-Hammam
18	21 July 1942	18:16	Hurricane	southwest of El Alamein	31	3 September 1942	14:35	Spitfire	3 km (1.9 mi) south of Bir Ibrahim
19	24 July 1942	09:40	P-40	south of Bir el Abd	32	6 September 1942	17:25	American fighter	south of Imayid
20	24 July 1942	17:19	Hurricane	south of Deir el Raghil					
– Stab IV. Gruppe of Jagdgeschwader 54 – Eastern Front — 14 September – 31 December 1943
33	11 October 1943	15:08	LaGG-3	PQ 35 Ost 06263, northeast of Usvyaty	35	27 October 1943	13:45	La-5	PQ 36 Ost 10714 northeast of Dubrovo
34	18 October 1943	10:04	P-40	southeast of Pushkin; 10 km (6.2 mi) southeast of Slutsk					
– Stab III. Gruppe of Jagdgeschwader 54 – Defense of the Reich — 1–10 March 1944
36	6 March 1944	12:06	B-17	PQ 05 Ost FQ-3/FR-2; Essen-Vechta					
– Stab III. Gruppe of Jagdgeschwader 7 "Nowotny" – Defense of the Reich — November 1944 – March 1945
37	26 November 1944	13:10	P-38	vicinity of Munich	39	3 March 1945	—	B-24	vicinity of Rathenow
38	3 March 1945	—	B-24	vicinity of Rathenow	40	7 March 1945	13:00+	P-51	vicinity of Jüterbog

=== Awards ===
- Honor Goblet of the Luftwaffe in Gold on 7 September 1942 as Oberleutnant and pilot
- German Cross in Gold on 27 October 1942 as Oberleutnant in the 6./Jagdgeschwader 27
