= Uthman Megrahi =

Libyan politician

Uthman Suleiman al-Megrahi (Arabic: عثمان سليمان المقرحي) is a former member of the Libyan National Transitional Council representing the city of Batnan.
