= Regdalin =

Regdalin رقدالين Umm Sahaba
- Nickname: Regdalin
- Location in Libya
- Coordinates: 32°53′00″N 11°59′00″E
- Country: Libya
- Region: Tripolitania
- District: Nuqat al Khams

Government
  - Mayor: Abdullah Almose
- Elevation: 9 m (30 ft)

Population (2012)
  - Total: 25.831
- Time zone: UTC+1 (UCT)
- Area code: 31

Regdalin (Arabic: رقدالين) is a city in Nuqat al Khams district near the Mediterranean coast of Northwestern Libya, 10 km southwest of the district capital Zuwara and 111 km west of Tripoli.

== Geography ==
The city is around 11 km (6.2 miles) from Zuwarah, 10 km north of the Mediterranean Sea, and 10 km northwest of Zliten. The town of Al Assad is about 35 km (22 miles) west southwest.

The town is southwest of Zuwarah.

== Transport ==
The city's nearest international airport is Zuwarah International Airport.

== History ==
The name Regdalin derives from the Libyan native Arabic language meaning Sleeping town. Because their elders back then used to sleep under trees

== Economy ==
The commercial sector is the cornerstone of economic activity. It has an active industrial zone based on the trade of spare auto parts, mechanical maintenance, building materials trade, and a vegetable and livestock market. The market is held twice a week.

The city's agricultural economy is based on crops such as olives, almonds, grapes, and figs, especially in the Southern and Western regions.

== Education ==
Regdalin offers primary and secondary education via four schools. Education extends to an institute for training in the field of engineering. The faculty of engineering belongs to Al-Zawia University.

== See also ==
- List of cities in Libya
- Zuwara Berber
