= Zahra, Libya =

Zahra الزهراء
- Baladiyat
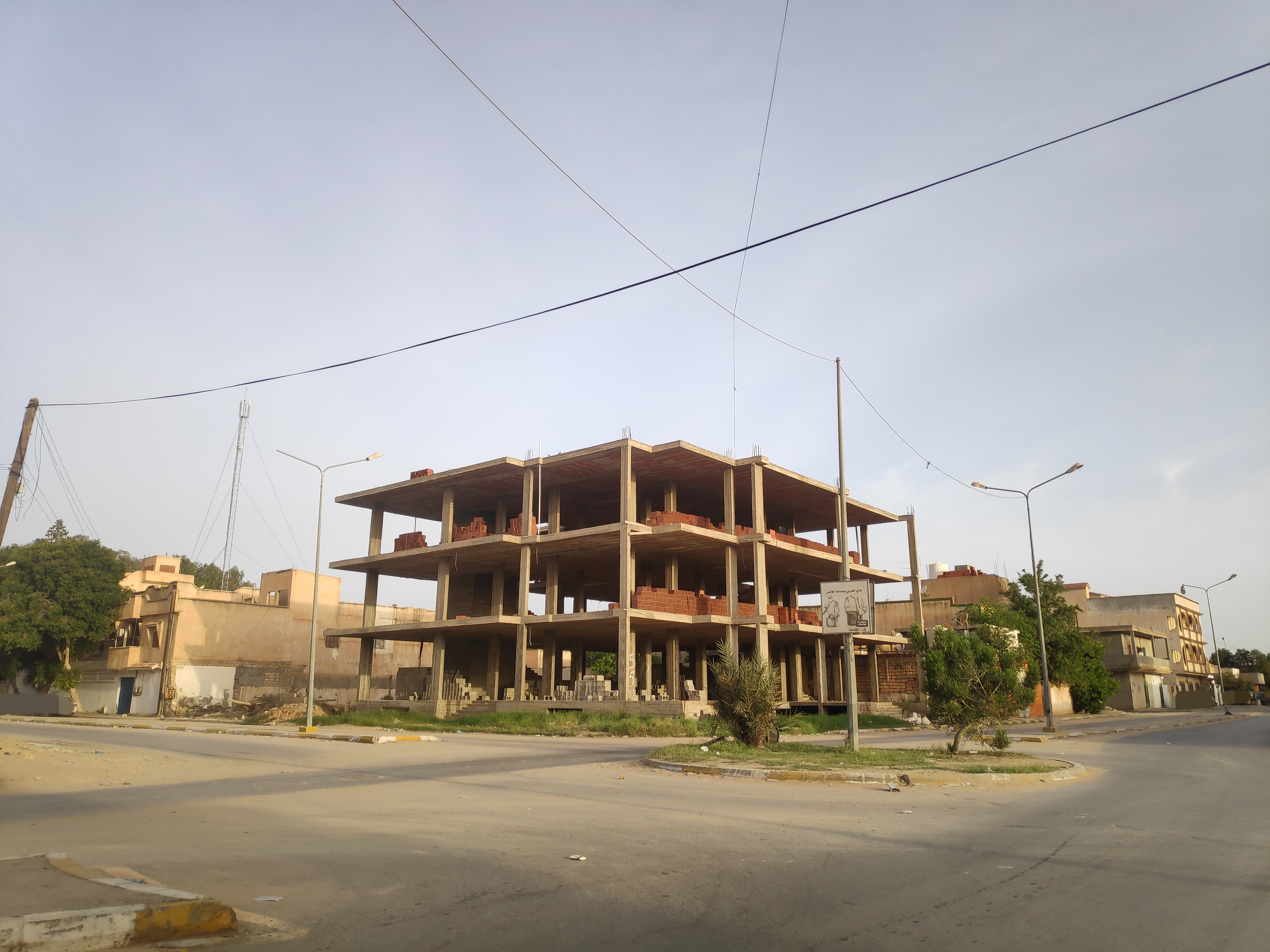

- Location within Libya
- Coordinates: 32.68306°N 12.86667°E
- Country: Libya
- District: Jafara

Zahra is a settlement of

Jafara in Libya.
