= Farzoughah =

Farzougha فرزوغة
- Village
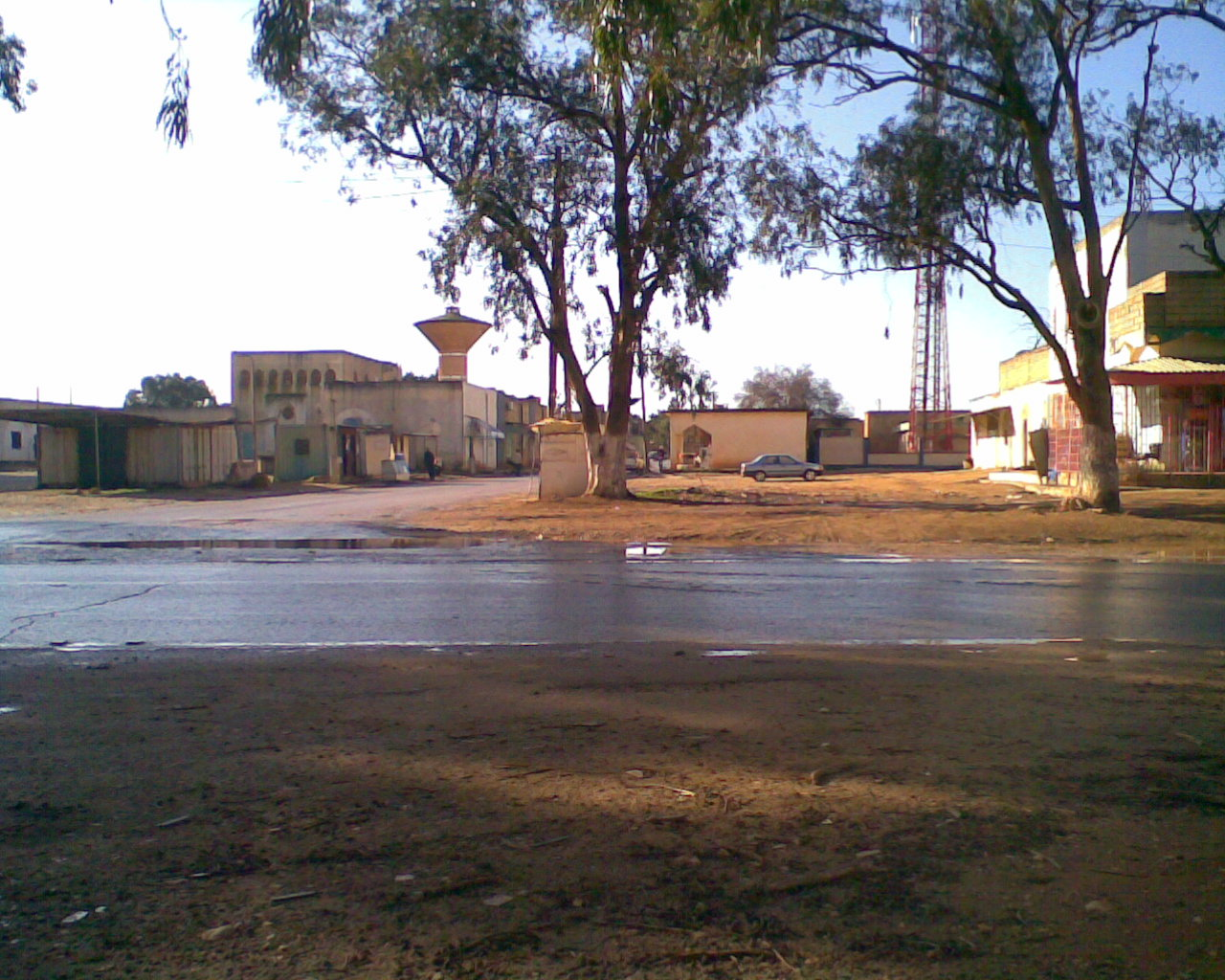

- Location in Libya
- Coordinates: 32°30′05″N 20°42′13″E
- Country: Libya
- Region: Cyrenaica
- District: Marj

Population (2006)
  - Total: 6,564
- Time zone: UTC+2 (EET)

Farzougha (Arabic: فرزوغة) is a village in the Jebel Akhdar landscape in the Marj District in the northern Cyrenaica region of northeastern Libya.

Under the Italian occupation it was named Baracca.

== Geography ==
Farzougha is located 12 km (7.5 mi) west of Marj, and 82 km (51 mi) east of Benghazi.

== See also ==
- List of cities in Libya
