= Suani Ben Adem =

- Baladiyat
- Location within Libya
- Coordinates: 32°43′3″N 13°4′35″E
- Country: Libya

Suani Ben Adem is a municipality in Libya. It has a population of 57,000, and is a southern suburb of Tripoli. In 1917, local inhabitants fought a battle there against troops of the Italian Empire. In 2019, it was the site of clashes between the Government of National Accord and the forces of Khalifa Haftar.
