= Qasr Khiar =

Qasr Al-AKhiar
- Baladiyat
- Country: Libya

Qasr Khiar is a settlement of Murqub in Libya.
