= Jadid, Libya =

Sebha سبها Sebha
- Town
- Location in Libya
- Coordinates: 27°03′00″N 14°24′00″E
- Country: Libya
- Region: Fezzan
- District: Sabha
- Elevation: 1,388 ft (423 m)
- Time zone: UTC+2 (EET)

Sebha or Sebha (Arabic: سبها) is a Saharan desert oasis town in the Fezzan region of southwest Libya. It is close to the capital of the Sabha District, Sabha.

== Geography ==
Jadid is located roughly 3 km (1.9 mi) north-west of Sabha, the capital of the Sabha District, and is roughly 657 km (408 mi) south-southwest of the capital of Libya, Tripoli.

== See also ==
- List of cities in Libya
