= Wadi Rabie =

- Baladiyat
- Location within Libya
- Country: Libya

Wadi Rabie is a settlement of Tripoli in Libya.
