= Willy Kientsch =

German flying ace

- Born: 12 May 1921; Kißlegg, Germany
- Died: 29 January 1944 (aged 22); Würrich, Nazi Germany
- Cause of death: Killed in action
- Burial place: cemetery in Neu-Ulm
- Military career
- Allegiance: Nazi Germany
- Branch: Luftwaffe
- Service years: 1940–1944
- Rank: Oberleutnant (first lieutenant)
- Nickname: "Willy"
- Unit: JG 27
- Commands: 6./JG 27
- Conflicts: See battles World War II: North African Campaign; Italian Campaign; Defense of the Reich †
- Awards: Knight's Cross of the Iron Cross with Oak Leaves

Wilhelm "Willy" Kientsch (12 May 1921 – 29 January 1944) was a German Luftwaffe military aviator and fighter ace during World War II. Kientsch claimed 53 victories all over the Western Front and North Africa in 295 combat missions. On 29 January 1944, Kientsch was killed in action when during aerial combat he crashed into the ground near Würrich. He was posthumously awarded the Knight's Cross of the Iron Cross with Oak Leaves on 20 July 1944.

== Career ==
Kientsch was born on 12 May 1921 in Kißlegg in the district of Wangen im Allgäu, at the time in the Free People's State of Württemberg of the Weimar Republic. The son of a merchant, he joined the military service of the Luftwaffe as a Fahnenjunker (cadet) in early 1940. Following flight training, (Note: Flight training in the Luftwaffe progressed through the levels A1, A2 and B1, B2, referred to as A/B flight training. A training included theoretical and practical training in aerobatics, navigation, long-distance flights and dead-stick landings. The B courses included high-altitude flights, instrument flights, night landings and training to handle the aircraft in difficult situations.) he was transferred to the Ergänzungsstaffel (Training/Supplement Squadron) of Jagdgeschwader 27 (JG 27—27th Fighter Wing) on 27 May 1941. At the time, the Ergänzungsstaffel was based at Grottkau, present-day Grodków in Poland. On 12 June, the unit was expanded by a second Staffel, transforming the unit to an Ergänzungsgruppe (Training/Supplement Group) and placed under the command under Hauptmann Herbert Nebenführ.

=== North African Campaign ===
II./JG 27 emblem

Kientsch was posted to II. Gruppe (2nd group) of JG 27 in January 1942. At the time, the Gruppe was commanded by Hauptmann Erich Gerlitz and equipped with the Messerschmitt Bf 109 F-4. On 7 February, II. Gruppe moved to an airfield at Martuba where they stayed until 23 May. Kientsch was credited with his first aerial victory on 18 March when he claimed two Curtiss P-40 Warhawk fighters shot down. That day, II. Gruppe claimed four aerial victories over near Ain el Gazala and Tobruk for the loss of one Bf 109 shot down by a pilot from the Royal Air Force (RAF) No. 260 Squadron. These claims are not verifiable through British records. In the afternoon of 7 April, P-40s escorted Douglas A-20 Havoc bombers, also referred to as "Boston". The RAF formation was intercepted by nine Bf 109s from II. Gruppe. During this encounter, Kientsch claimed a P-40 shot down which may have belonged to No. 450 Squadron RAAF. His claim may have been double counted as Oberleutnant Gustav Rödel filed a similar claim. On 1 May, Kientsch was promoted to Leutnant (second lieutenant).

On 20 May, command of II. Gruppe was transferred from Gerlitz to Rödel. Three days later, the Gruppe relocated to an airfield at Timimi. That day, Kientsch claimed two P-40s, one of which was not confirmed. Kientsch claimed another P-40 shot down on 4 June in aerial combat with South African Air Force (SAAF) P-40s from 2 Squadron, 4 Squadron and 5 Squadron. The SAAF fighters had just intercepted Junkers Ju 87 dive bombers from I. Gruppe of Sturzkampfgeschwader 3 (StG 3—3rd Dive Bomber Wing) over Bir Hakeim. On 17 June, Kientsch claimed a P-40 shot down near Sidi Rezegh. On this mission, II. Gruppe lost its leading fighter pilot to date, Oberleutnant Otto Schulz, who was shot down and killed in action. On 23 June, following the Axis capture of Tobruk, II. Gruppe moved to an airfield named Menastir located on the Bay of Sallum and then to Sidi Barrani three days later to support the Axis forces fighting in the Battle of Mersa Matruh. On 30 June, II. Gruppe moved to an airfield at Fukah, located approximately 50 kilometers (31 miles) east of Mersa Matruh where they engaged in the aerial battles during the First Battle of El Alamein. Two days later, the Gruppe moved to a makeshift airfield named Quotaifiya, located approximately 50 kilometers (31 miles) east of Fukah where they stayed until 30 October.

On 18 November, Hawker Hurricane fighters from No. 33 Squadron attacked and strafed the airfield at Benghazi which destroyed a Junkers Ju 88 parked on the airfield. In addition, a Junkers Ju 52 transport aircraft was also shot down. The Hurricane fighters then came under attack of six Bf 109s from II. Gruppe of JG 27. In this encounter, Kientsch claimed an aerial victory over a P-40. However, his opponent may have been misidentified as the American born Squadron Leader Robert Louis Mannix, who was shot down and posted as missing in action that day, matched time and location of claim filed by Kientsch. Later that day, II. Gruppe moved to an airfield named Merduma, located near Ras Lanuf. Here on 27 November, Kientsch claimed his last aerial victory over North Africa when he shot down a Supermarine Spitfire fighter near Ajdabiya. On 5 December, the first elements of II. Gruppe of Jagdgeschwader 77 (JG 77—77th Fighter Wing) arrived in Libya which replaced II. Gruppe of JG 27 in the North African theater. On the morning of 6 December, II. Gruppe of JG 27 flew its last combat missions. The pilots then handed over the remaining four serviceable Bf 109s to JG 77 and was then flown on Ju 52 from Tripoli to Sicily and Naples.

=== Mediterranean theater ===
After II. Gruppe of JG 27 was withdrawn from North Africa the unit was ordered to Düsseldorf. The pilots where then sent on home-leave. On 2 January 1943, the Gruppe was ordered to the airfield Wien-Aspern at Vienna and to Sicily on 15 February. The personnel travelled by train to Bari where they received factory new Bf 109 G-4 trop aircraft. The Gruppe arrived at the airfield in Trapani on 27 February. On 5 April, the Western Allies launched the air operation codenamed Operation Flax, designed to cut air supply between Italy and the Axis forces in Tunis, Tunisia. At 12:30, the United States Army Air Forces (USAAF) attacked the Luftwaffe airfield at Trapani with 19 Boeing B-17 Flying Fortress bombers. Defending against this attack, Kientsch claimed an escorting Lockheed P-38 Lightning fighter shot down near Marettimo. Throughout April, Allied forces continuously attacked the German supply lines. On 13 April, Kientsch caught up with the bombers after they completed their bomb-run on the Trapani airfield and shot down one of the attacking B-17 bombers. On 28 May, the USAAF attacked various targets in Sicily. In combat with the escorting fighter of the 14th Fighter Group, Kientsch claimed two P-38 fighters near Granitola Torretta and Pantelleria.

On 1 June 1943, Kientsch was appointed Staffelkapitän (squadron leader) of 6. Staffel of JG 27. He succeeded Oberleutnant Rudolf Sinner who was transferred. On 15 June, Kientsch claimed three aerial victories near Marettimo. That day, bombers of the USAAF 17th, 310th, 319th, 320th Bombardment Group targeted Trapani and Borizzo Airfield in Sicily. Defending against this attack, Kientsch claimed an escorting P-38 and a North American B-25 Mitchell bomber shot down. Later that morning, Kientsch also claimed a Spitfire shot down. This claim however cannot be matched against RAF records.

=== Defense of the Reich and death ===
In late July 1943, II. Gruppe of JG 27 was ordered back to Germany. At first ordered to Wiesbaden-Erbenheim Airfield, where they arrived on 9 August, the unit then moved to Eschborn Airfield on 20 August. There, the Gruppe received new Bf 109 G-6 aircraft and replacement pilots and trained for defense of the Reich missions. While based at Eschborn, Kientsch was awarded the German Cross in Gold (Deutsches Kreuz in Gold) on 16 August.

On 6 September, II. Gruppe flew its first operational combat mission when the USAAF VIII Bomber Command targeted Stuttgart. At 10:45, the Gruppe intercepted a B-17 formation near Stuttgart. In this encounter, pilots of II. Gruppe claimed nine aerial victories, six were later confirmed including two by Kientsch, for the loss of one pilot killed in action. He was awarded the Knight's Cross of the Iron Cross (Ritterkreuz des Eisernen Kreuzes) on 22 November 1943 for 44 aerial victories claimed. On 1 December, Kientsch was promoted to Oberleutnant (first lieutenant). On 11 January 1944, VIII Bomber Command targeted German aircraft production in central Germany, attacking the cities Halberstadt, Magdeburg, Oschersleben and Braunschweig. In total, the USAAF dispatched 663 heavy bombers, escorted by 592 fighter aircraft. The attack however did not proceed as planned and the bombers of the 2nd and 3rd Bombardment Division were ordered to return prior to reaching the target area and bombed various "targets of opportunity" in the area of Osnabrück, Bielefeld, Herford, Meppen and Lingen. In consequence of this order, the USAAF fighter protection was dispersed. II. Gruppe of JG 27 was scrambled at 11:47 and vectored to a formation of Consolidated B-24 Liberator bombers near Assen. In this encounter, II. Gruppe pilots claimed seven aerial victories and two Herausschüsse. Kientsch was credited with the destruction of one B-24 bomber.

On 29 January 1944, Kientsch was killed in action when during aerial combat he crashed his Bf 109 G-6 "Yellow 3" (Werknummer 440 073—factory number) into the ground near Würrich. The accident occurred during aerial combat with P-38s in the Hunsrück area. He was succeeded by Oberleutnant Eberhard Schade as commander of 6. Staffel. Posthumously, Kientsch was awarded the Knight's Cross of the Iron Cross with Oak Leaves (Ritterkreuz des Eisernen Kreuzes mit Eichenlaub) on 20 July 1944. He was the 527th member of the German armed forces to be so honored. His grave is in Neu-Ulm.

== Summary of career ==
=== Aerial victory claims ===
According to US historian David T. Zabecki, Kientsch was credited with 53 aerial victories. Obermaier also lists him with 53 enemy aircraft shot down, 16 of which in North Africa, 25 in Sicily and 12 in defense of the Reich. His 53 aerial victories included 20 four-engined bombers. Mathews and Foreman, authors of Luftwaffe Aces — Biographies and Victory Claims, researched the German Federal Archives and found records for 47 aerial victory claims, plus seven further unconfirmed claims. All of his aerial victories were claimed over the Western Allies on the Western Front or in North Africa and include 16 four-engined heavy bombers.

Victory claims were logged to a map-reference (PQ = Planquadrat), for example "PQ 05 Ost S/DN-8". The Luftwaffe grid map (Jägermeldenetz) covered all of Europe, western Russia and North Africa and was composed of rectangles measuring 15 minutes of latitude by 30 minutes of longitude, an area of about 360 square miles (930 km^{2}). These sectors were then subdivided into 36 smaller units to give a location area 3 km × 4 km (1.9 mi × 2.5 mi) in size.

Chronicle of aerial victories
This and the – (dash) indicates unconfirmed aerial victory claims for which Kientsch did not receive credit. This along with the * (asterisk) indicates an Herausschuss (separation shot)—a severely damaged heavy bomber forced to separate from his combat box which was counted as an aerial victory. This and the ? (question mark) indicates information discrepancies listed by Prien, Balke, Stemmer, Rodeike, Bock, Mathews and Foreman.
Claim	Date	Time	Type	Location	Unit	Claim	Date	Time	Type	Location	Unit
– Claims with II. Gruppe of Jagdgeschwader 27 – In North Africa — September 1941 – December 1942
1	18 March 1942	08:20	P-40	15 km (9.3 mi) southwest Ain el Gazala	Stab II./JG 27	8	21 July 1942	18:20	Hurricane	southeast El Alamein	5./JG 27
2	18 March 1942	08:40	P-40	10 km (6.2 mi) southeast Tobruk	Stab II./JG 27	9	20 October 1942	11:40	P-40	southeast Bir el Abd	5./JG 27
3	7 April 1942	15:45	P-40	south Ain el Gazala	6./JG 27	10	21 October 1942	08:50	P-40	southeast El Dabaa	5./JG 27
4	23 May 1942	09:40	P-40	10 km (6.2 mi) north Ras el Tin	Stab II./JG 27	11	23 October 1942	07:55	P-40	northeast El Alamein	5./JG 27
—	23 May 1942	09:55	P-40	3 km (1.9 mi) northeast Ain el Gazala	Stab II./JG 27	12	24 October 1942	16:40	P-40	southeast El Alamein	5./JG 27
5	4 June 1942	08:20	P-40	10 km (6.2 mi) southwest Mteifel Chebir	Stab II./JG 27	13	26 October 1942	06:40	P-40	southwest El Alamein	5./JG 27
6	9 June 1942	19:05	P-40	northeast Bir Hacheim	Stab II./JG 27	14	18 November 1942	09:20	P-40	east-northeast Sidi Ahmed el Magrun	5./JG 27
7	17 June 1942	10:25	P-40	east of Sidi Rezegh	Stab II./JG 27	15	27 November 1942	15:25	Spitfire	15 km (9.3 mi) southwest Ajdabiya	5./JG 27
– Claims with II. Gruppe of Jagdgeschwader 27 – Sicily, Tunisia and Italy — February – July 1943
16	5 April 1943	12:50	P-38	35 km (22 mi) west Marettimo	6./JG 27	29	9 June 1943	14:10	P-38	20 km (12 mi) south Pantelleria	6./JG 27
17	13 April 1943	13:30	B-17	10 km (6.2 mi) north Trapani	6./JG 27	30	10 June 1943	12:28	Spitfire	10 km (6.2 mi) northwest Pantelleria	6./JG 27
18	16 April 1943	16:45	P-38	30 km (19 mi) north-northwest Marettimo	6./JG 27	31	10 June 1943	12:32	Spitfire	20 km (12 mi) west-southwest Pantelleria	6./JG 27
19	16 April 1943	16:55	P-38	60 km (37 mi) northwest Marettimo	6./JG 27	32	15 June 1943	08:40	B-25	30 km (19 mi) southwest Marettimo	6./JG 27
20	29 April 1943	11:35	P-38	25 km (16 mi) west Marettimo	6./JG 27	33	15 June 1943	08:45	P-38	40 km (25 mi) south Marettimo	6./JG 27
21	30 April 1943	10:30	Spitfire	30 km (19 mi) southeast Kelibia	6./JG 27	34	15 June 1943	10:15	Spitfire	1 km (0.62 mi) north Marettimo	6./JG 27
22	9 May 1943	13:45	B-17	30 km (19 mi) west-northwest Trapani	6./JG 27	35	2 July 1943	11:30	B-24	20 km (12 mi) southwest Gallipoli	6./JG 27
23	21 May 1943	11:20	B-17	south-southwest Granitola Torretta	6./JG 27	36	10 July 1943	16:05	Spitfire	15 km (9.3 mi) east Syracuse	6./JG 27
24	22 May 1943	16:00	B-17	20 km (12 mi) southwest Marettimo	6./JG 27	37	13 July 1943	15:35	Spitfire	20 km (12 mi) southwest Syracuse	6./JG 27
25	25 May 1943	11:30	B-17	20 km (12 mi) northwest Ustica	6./JG 27	38	16 July 1943	13:10	B-24	5 km (3.1 mi) northeast Molfetta	6./JG 27
26	28 May 1943	18:10	P-38	south-southwest Granitola Torretta	6./JG 27	39	17 July 1943	14:10	B-24	30 km (19 mi) southwest Salerno	6./JG 27
27	28 May 1943	18:13	P-38	20 km (12 mi) north-northwest Pantelleria	6./JG 27	40	19 July 1943	11:00	B-24	100 km (62 mi) south Spartivento	6./JG 27
28	9 June 1943	14:02	P-38	northeast Pantelleria	6./JG 27						
– Claims with II. Gruppe of Jagdgeschwader 27 – Defense of the Reich — September 1943 – January 1944
41? (Note: According to Mathews and Foreman, this claim is unconfirmed.)	6 September 1943	10:53	B-17	southeast Schorndorf	6./JG 27	47?	19 December 1943	12:32	B-17*	80 km (50 mi) south-southeast Innsbruck	6./JG 27
42?	6 September 1943	11:00	B-17	south-southwest Böblingen	6./JG 27	48?	19 December 1943	12:35	B-17*	80 km (50 mi) south-southeast Innsbruck	6./JG 27
43?	4 October 1943	11:42	B-17	Valmy	6./JG 27	49	20 December 1943	12:05	B-24	northwest Bremen	6./JG 27
44	26 November 1943	13:10	B-17	Duurswoude	6./JG 27	—	5 January 1944	—	P-47		6./JG 27
45	26 November 1943	13:30	B-24	PQ 05 Ost S/DN-8, Leeuwarden	6./JG 27	50	7 January 1944	12:20	B-17*	Neunkirchen	6./JG 27
46	1 December 1943	12:10	B-17	vicinity of Bonn	6./JG 27	51	11 January 1944	12:12	B-24	east Assen	6./JG 27
— ? (Note: According to Mathews and Foreman, this claim is confirmed.)	1 December 1943	12:30	B-17*	vicinity of Cologne	6./JG 27						

=== Awards ===
- Iron Cross (1939) 2nd and 1st Class
- Honor Goblet of the Luftwaffe on 9 August 1943 as Leutnant and pilot
- German Cross in Gold on 16 August 1943 as Leutnant in the 6./Jagdgeschwader 27
- Knight's Cross of the Iron Cross with Oak Leaves
  - Knight's Cross on 22 November 1943 as Leutnant and Staffelführer of the 6./Jagdgeschwader 27 (Note: According to Scherzer as pilot in the II./Jagdgeschwader 27.)
  - 527th Oak Leaves on 20 July 1944 as Oberleutnant and Staffelkapitän of the 6./Jagdgeschwader 27
