= Mashashita =

Mashashita المشاشطة
- Village
- Location in Libya
- Coordinates: 32°47′55″N 13°00′00″E
- Country: Libya
- District: Tripoli
- Municipality: Janzur (Zanzur)
- Elevation: 102 ft (31 m)
- Time zone: UTC+2

Mashashita (المشاشطة) is a village in Libya, about 22 kilometres (14 mi) west of Tripoli. It is known for olive trees, palm trees, and some vegetables. The town has a mosque, called Salem Almashat Mosque, which is estimated to be 400 years old. Mashashita is located within the administrative district of Tripoli.
