= Al Abraq, Libya =

Al Abraq الأبرق Labraq
- Town
- Location in Libya
- Coordinates: 32°47′12″N 21°59′52″E
- Country: Libya
- District: Derna

Population (2006)
  - Total: 8,861
- Time zone: UTC+2 (EET)

Al Abraq (Arabic: الأبرق) is a town in Libya, in the Derna District. It is located 23 km east of Bayda, Other names include the transliterations Al Labrag, Al Labraq, Al Lazraq, and El-Abràgh, as well as the Italian Luigi di Savoia. According to the census of 2006, the city had a population of 8,861 people.

== Transport ==
The La Abraq Airport (IATA code LAQ), also known as Al Bayda International Airport, which serves the eastern Libyan city of Bayda, is located 16 km west of the town of Al Abraq.

== See also ==
- List of cities in Libya
