= Umm al Rizam =

Umm al Rizam أم الرزم
- Town
- Location in Libya
- Coordinates: 32°31′57″N 23°00′19″E
- Country: Libya
- District: Derna

Population (2006)
  - Total: 12,098
- Time zone: UTC+2 (EET)

Umm al Rizam (Arabic: أم الرزم) is a town in eastern Libya. It is located some 48 km (30 mi) south of Derna. It is linked to Ras et Teen beach by a road which is 16 km (10 mi) long.

== See also ==
- List of cities in Libya
