= Al-ʽUrban =

Al-ʽUrban العربان
- Town
- Location in Libya
- Coordinates: 32°10′04″N 13°23′20″E
- Country: Libya
- Region: Tripolitania
- District: Jabal al Gharbi
- Elevation: 398 m (1,306 ft)
- Time zone: UTC+2 (EET)

Al-ʽUrban is a town in northwestern Libya, in the Jabal al Gharbi District. Prior to 2007 it was located at the Gharyan District. It is close to the capital of the district, Gharyan, and is roughly 80 kilometres (50 mi) south of the country's capital, Tripoli. It is the home of three tribes: Awlad Al-brek, Gmata, and Jaãfra.

== See also ==
- List of cities in Libya
