= Bi'r al Ashhab =

Bi'r al Ashhab بئر الأشهب
- Village
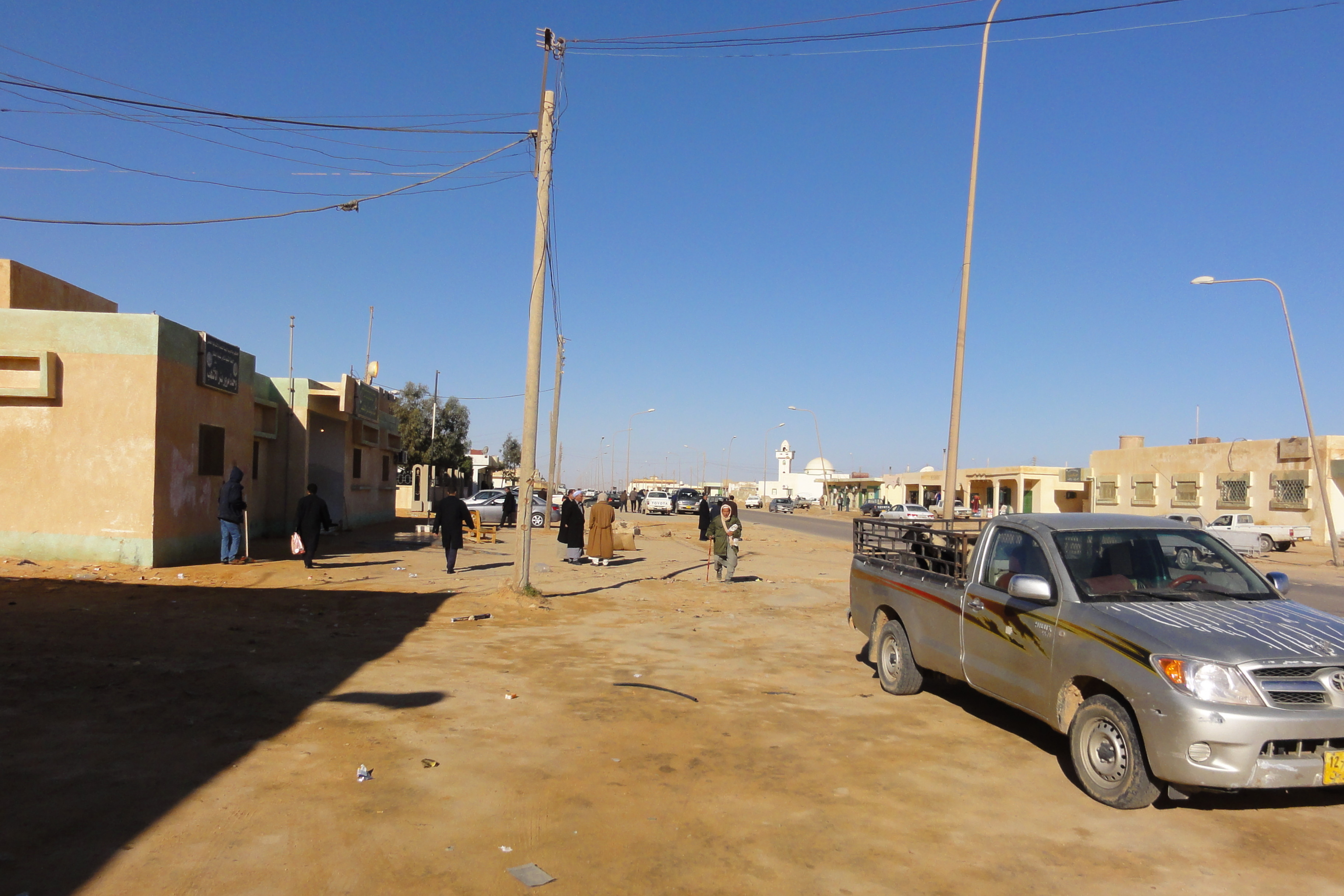

- Location in Libya
- Coordinates: 31°55′00″N 24°42′00″E
- Country: Libya
- Region: Cyrenaica
- District: Butnan

Population (2006)
  - Total: 6,399
- Time zone: UTC+2 (EET)

Bi'r al Ashhab is a small village located at Cyrenaica in eastern Libya. It is located about 69 kilometres south-east of the capital of the Butnan District - Tobruk.
