= Al Qubbah =

Al Qubbah القبة El Gubba, Quba
- Town
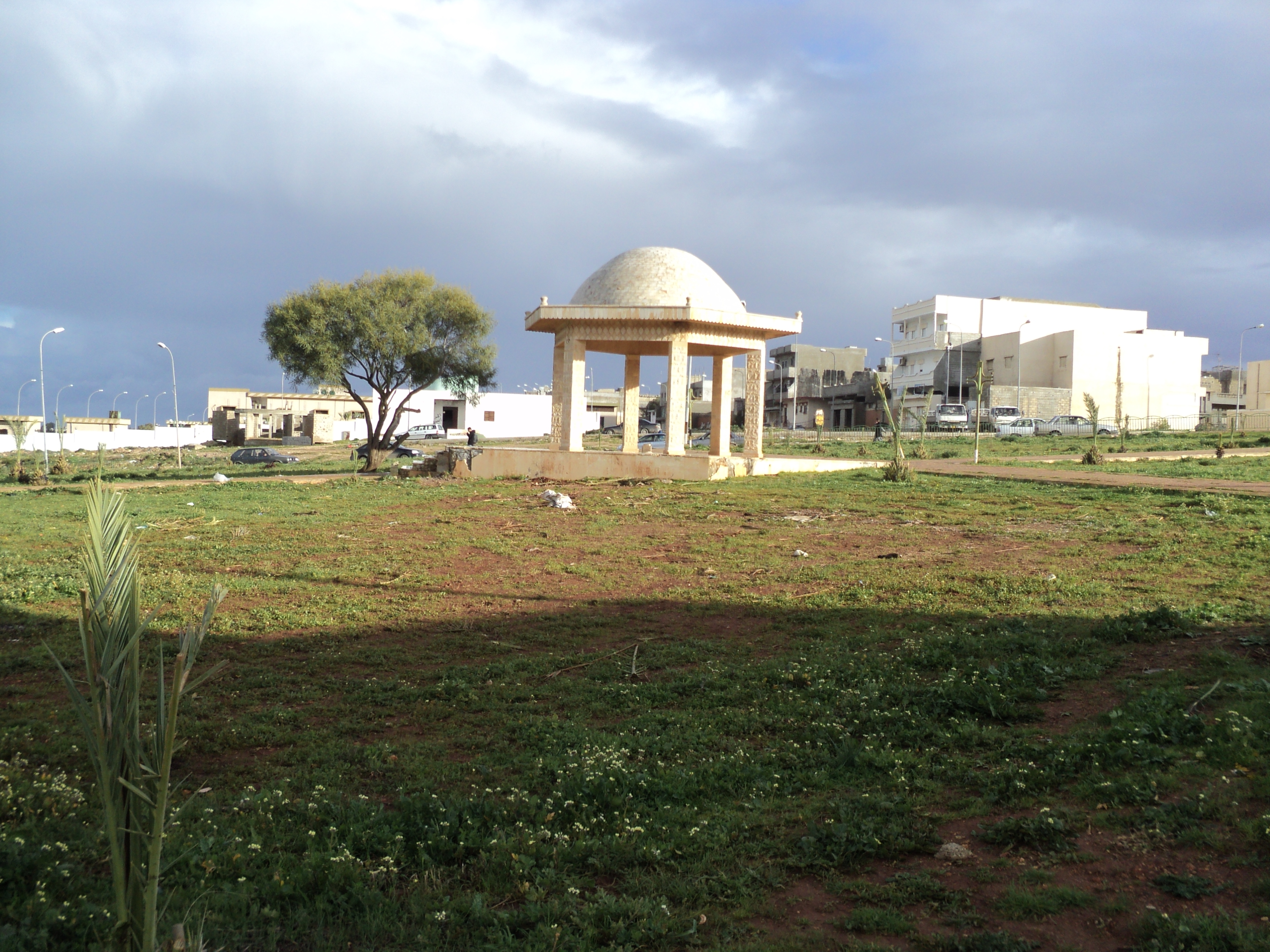

- Location in Libya
- Coordinates: 32°46′00″N 22°15′00″E
- Country: Libya
- Region: Cyrenaica
- District: Derna
- Elevation: 2,323 ft (708 m)

Population (2006)
  - Total: 24,631
- Time zone: UTC+2 (EET)
- License Plate Code: 49

Al Qubbah or El Gubba (Arabic: القبة) is a town in eastern Libya. Once capital of Quba District.

It is the largest populated place between Derna and Bayda.

== History ==
It was named after Giovanni Berta during the Italian colonial period.
