= Quba District (Libya) =

Former district of Libya

Coordinates: 31°51′20″N 22°47′28″E

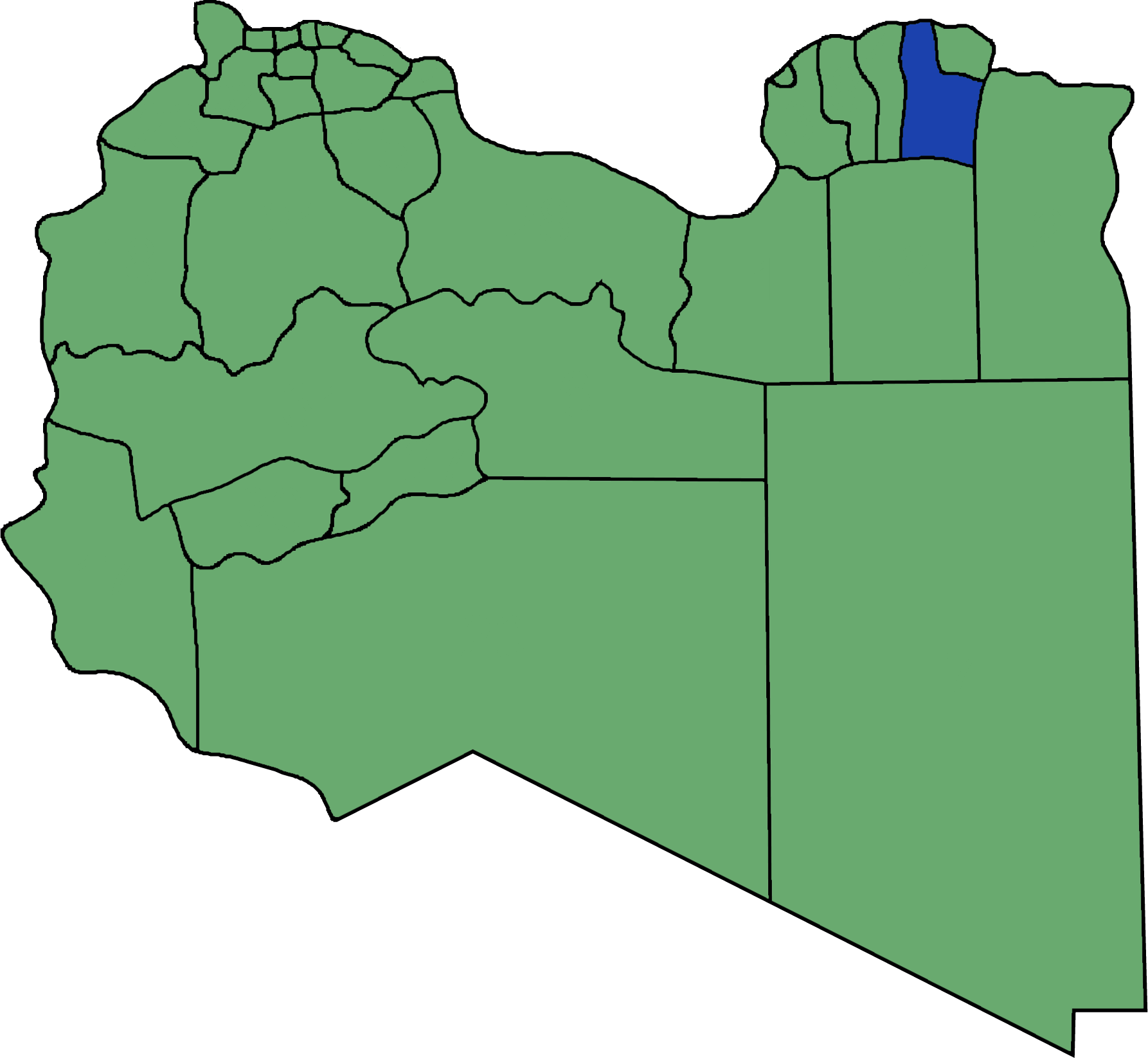
Pre-2007 extent of Al Qubah District

Quba or Qoba (Al Qubah) was one of the 32 districts of Libya. In 2007 it became part of the Derna District. The population of the former district was approximately 93,000.

In the north, Al Qubah had a shoreline on the Mediterranean Sea. On land, it bordered the following districts:

- Derna - northeast
- Butnan - east
- Al Wahat - south
- Jabal al Akhdar - west

The administrative centre was the town of Quba, some 8 kilometres inland from the coast, which was also known as Giovanni Berta during Italian colonial times. Transcription from Arabic has led to various spellings, such as Al Qubbah, Gubba, Al Gubbah, El-Gubba and El-Gúbba. During World War II, it was also dubbed "Gub-Gub" by the allied troops.

== See also ==
- List of cities in Libya
