= Butnan District =

Coastal district in eastern Libya

Butnan البطنان
- District
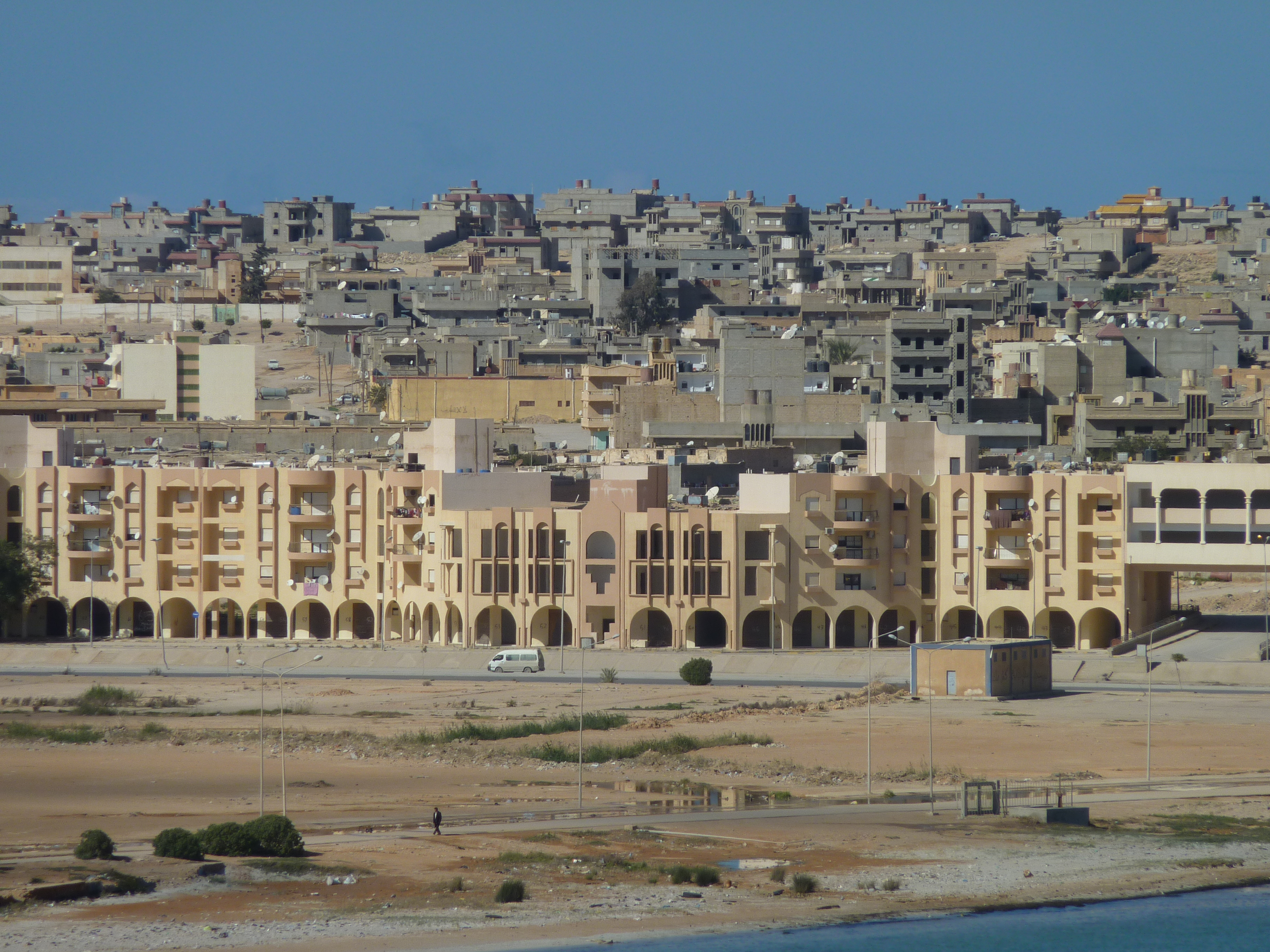

- Map of Libya with Al Butnan district highlighted
- Coordinates: 30°N 24°E
- Country: Libya
- Capital: Tobruk

Area
  - Total: 83,860 km^{2} (32,380 sq mi)

Population (2006)
  - Total: 159,536
  - Estimate (2020): 195,088
  - Density: 1.902/km^{2} (4.927/sq mi)
- ISO 3166 code: LY-BU
- License Plate Code: 14

Butnan (Arabic: البطنان Al Buṭnān) sometimes called Tubruq District or Tobruk District from the former name, occasionally Marmarica, is an administrative district (shabiyah) in eastern Libya. Its capital city is Tobruk.

In the north, Butnan has a shoreline on the Mediterranean Sea. To the east, it borders Egypt's Matruh Governorate, along with a small border on the Al Wadi al Jadid Governorate in the far southeast. Domestically, it borders Derna in the northwest and Al Wahat in west and south. The most important settlements are Tobruk, Jaghbub and Bardia.

Per the census of 2012, the total population in the region was 157,747 with 150,353 Libyans. The average size of the household in the district was 6.9, while the average household size of non-Libyans being 3.7. There were totally 22,713 in the district and the population density of the district was 1.86 persons per km^{2}. Per 2006 census, there were totally 50,154 economically active people in the district.

== History ==
Traditionally part of Marmarica, and later part of the province of Cyrenaica in Italian Libya, with the division of Libya into ten governorates in 1963, Al Butnan became part of the Darnah Governorate. In 1983 the Darnah Governorate was divided into a number of baladiyat (districts), with what is now Butnan being included in the Tobruk baladiyah and others. Butnan District was created in 1988 as one of the twenty-five reorganized baladiyat. In 1995, Butnan was one of the thirteen new shabiyah, and Butnan retained its status through the reorganizations of 1998, 2001 and 2007.

== Geography ==
Libya has mostly a flat undulating plain and occasional plateau, with an average elevation of around 423 m (1,388 ft). Around 91 per cent of the land is covered by desert, with only 8.8 per cent agricultural land (with only 1% arable lands) and 0.1 per cent of forests. The major resources are petroleum, gypsum and natural gas. Along the coastal regions, the climate is Mediterranean in coastal areas, while it is desert climate in all other parts. Dust storms lasting four to eight days is pretty common during Spring. Triplotania is the northwest region, while it is Cyrenacia in the east and Fezzen in southwest. Cyrenacia is the largest region in Libya, which is mostly semi arid in nature. The region receives an annual rainfall of 5 in (130 mm). There are no perennial rivers in the region, but the region is abundant with groundwater aquifers.

== Demographics ==
Per the census of 2012, the total population in the region was 157,747 with 150,353 Libyans. The average size of the household in the country was 6.9, while the average household size of non-Libyans being 3.7. There were totally 22,713 in the district, with 20,907 Libyan ones. The population density of the district was 1.86 persons per km^{2}. Per 2006 census, there were totally 50,154 economically active people in the district. There were 27,263 government employees, 5,788 employers, 20,033 first level workers and 179 second level workers. There were 13,156 workers in state administration, 1,798 in agriculture, animal husbandry and forestry, 2,019 in agriculture & hunting, 10,900 in education, 3,879 in private enterprises, 2,889 in health & social work, 2,232 in production, 12,311 in technical work and 393 service workers. The total enrollment in schools was 53,441 and the number of people above secondary stage and less than graduation was 3,311. As per the report from World Health Organization (WHO), there were one communicable disease centre, two dental clinics, one general clinic, one in-patient clinic, seven out-patient clinics, 38 pharmacies, 65 PHC centres, one polyclinic, two rural clinics and no specialized clinics. Islam is the state and major religion of the country.

== Administration ==
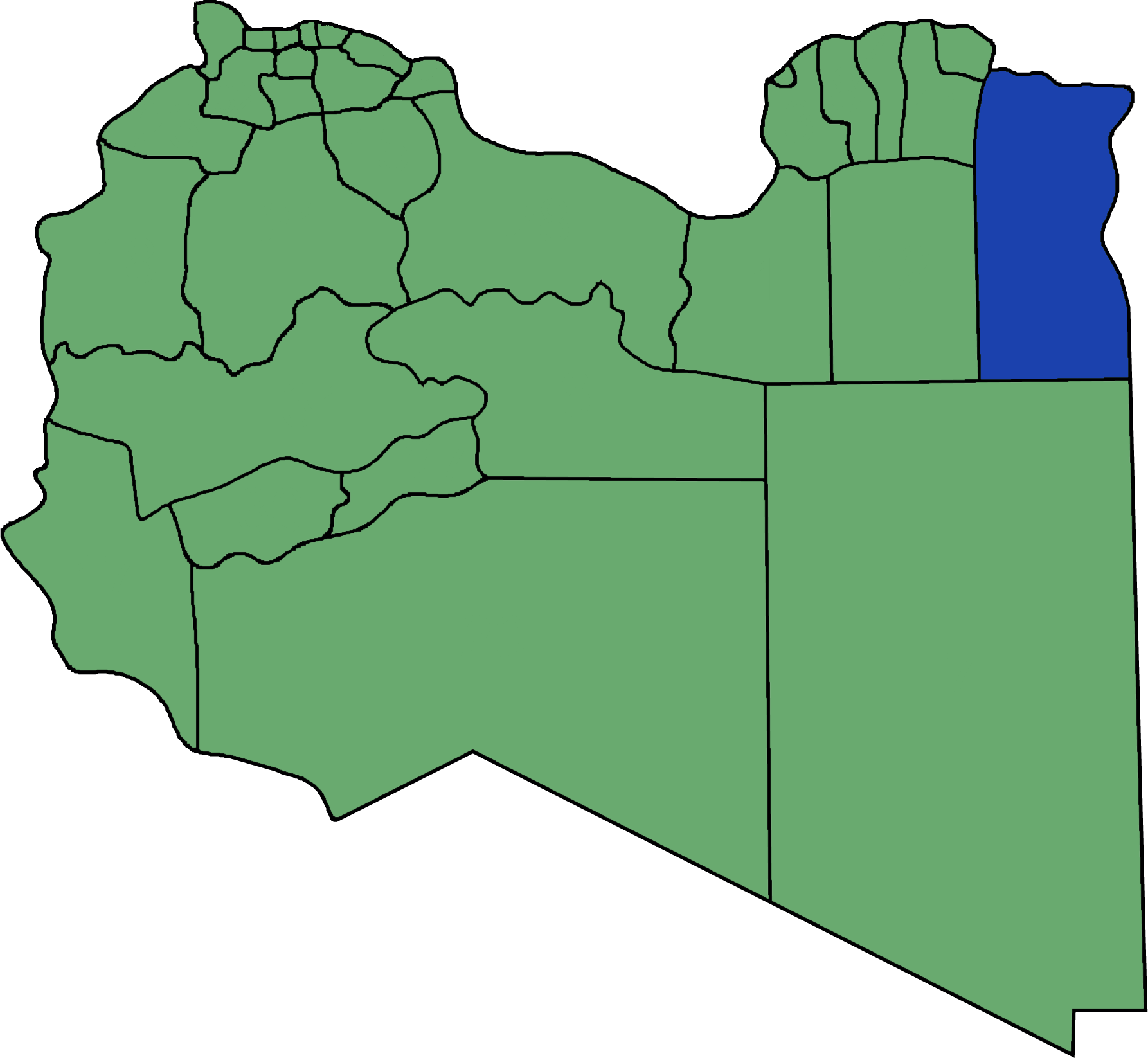
The same district between 2001 and 2007

In 2007 the formerly autonomous city of Jaghbub became part of Butnan District. Libya became independent in 1951 from the colonial empire and is generally known for its oil rich resources. All the powers rested centrally with President Gaddafi for 42 years until the 2011 armed rebellion which toppled him. As per the constitution, Libya is the most decentralized Arab nation, but practically all powers are vested in the central government on account of its control over the oil revenues. Local governmental institutions manage the administration of education, industry, and communities. As a part of decentralization in 2012, the country is administratively split into 13 regions from the original 25 municipalities, which were further divided in 1,500 communes. Since 2015, the chief of the state is a Chairman of Presidential Council, while the Prime Minister is the head of the state. The House of Representatives is an elected body that is elected on universal suffrage and popular vote. As of 2016, there were 22 administrative divisions in the country in the form of districts.
