= Derna District =

District of Libya

Coordinates: 32°30′N 22°40′E

Derna درنة
- District
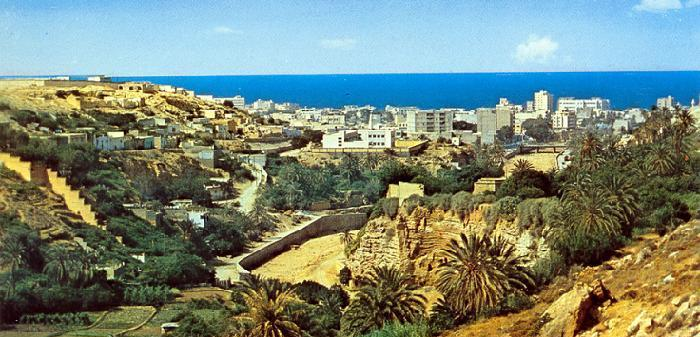

- Map of Libya with Derna district highlighted
- Country: Libya
- Capital: Derna

Area
  - Total: 19,630 km^{2} (7,580 sq mi)

Population (2006)
  - Total: 163,351
  - Density: 8.321/km^{2} (21.55/sq mi)
- License Plate Code: 10, 49, 60

Derna (Arabic: درنة Darnah) is one of the districts of Libya. It is in the northeast of the country, in the historical region of Cyrenaica. Its capital is Derna. In 2007 the district was enlarged to include what had been the Al Qubah District. In the north, Derna has a shoreline on the Mediterranean Sea. On land, it borders Butnan in the east, Jabal al Akhdar in the west and Al Wahat to the south.

Per the census of 2012, the total population in the region was 157,747 with 150,353 Libyans. The average size of the household in the country was 6.9, while the average household size of non-Libyans being 3.7. There were totally 22,713 households in the district, with 20,907 Libyan ones. The population density of the district was 1.86 persons per km^{2}. Per 2006 census, there were totally 56,607 economically active people in the district.

== Geography ==
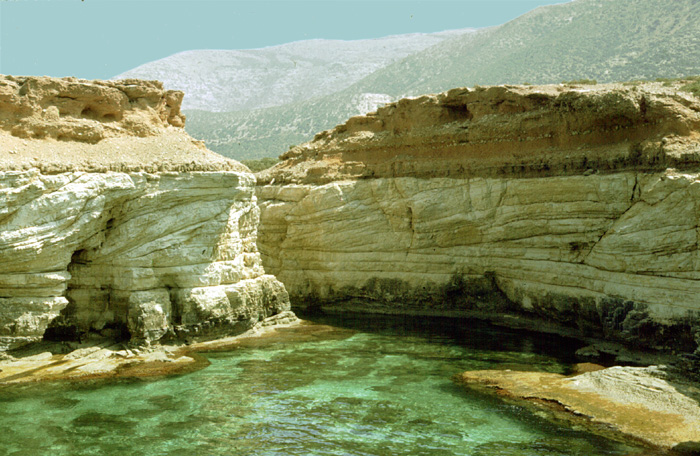
The rocky coasts in the region

Libya has mostly a flat undulating plain and occasional plateau, with an average elevation of around 423 m (1,388 ft). Around 91 per cent of the land is covered by desert, with only 8.8 per cent agricultural land (with only 1% arable lands) and 0.1 per cent of forests. The major resources are petroleum, gypsum and natural gas. Along the coastal regions, the climate is Mediterranean in coastal areas, while it is desert climate in all other parts. Dust storms lasting four to eight days is pretty common during Spring. Tripolitania is the northwest region, while it is Cyrenaica in the east and Fezzen in southwest. Cyrenacia is the largest region in Libya, which is mostly semi arid in nature. The region receives an annual rainfall of 5 in (130 mm). There are no perennial rivers in the region, but the region is abundant with groundwater aquifers.

== Administration ==
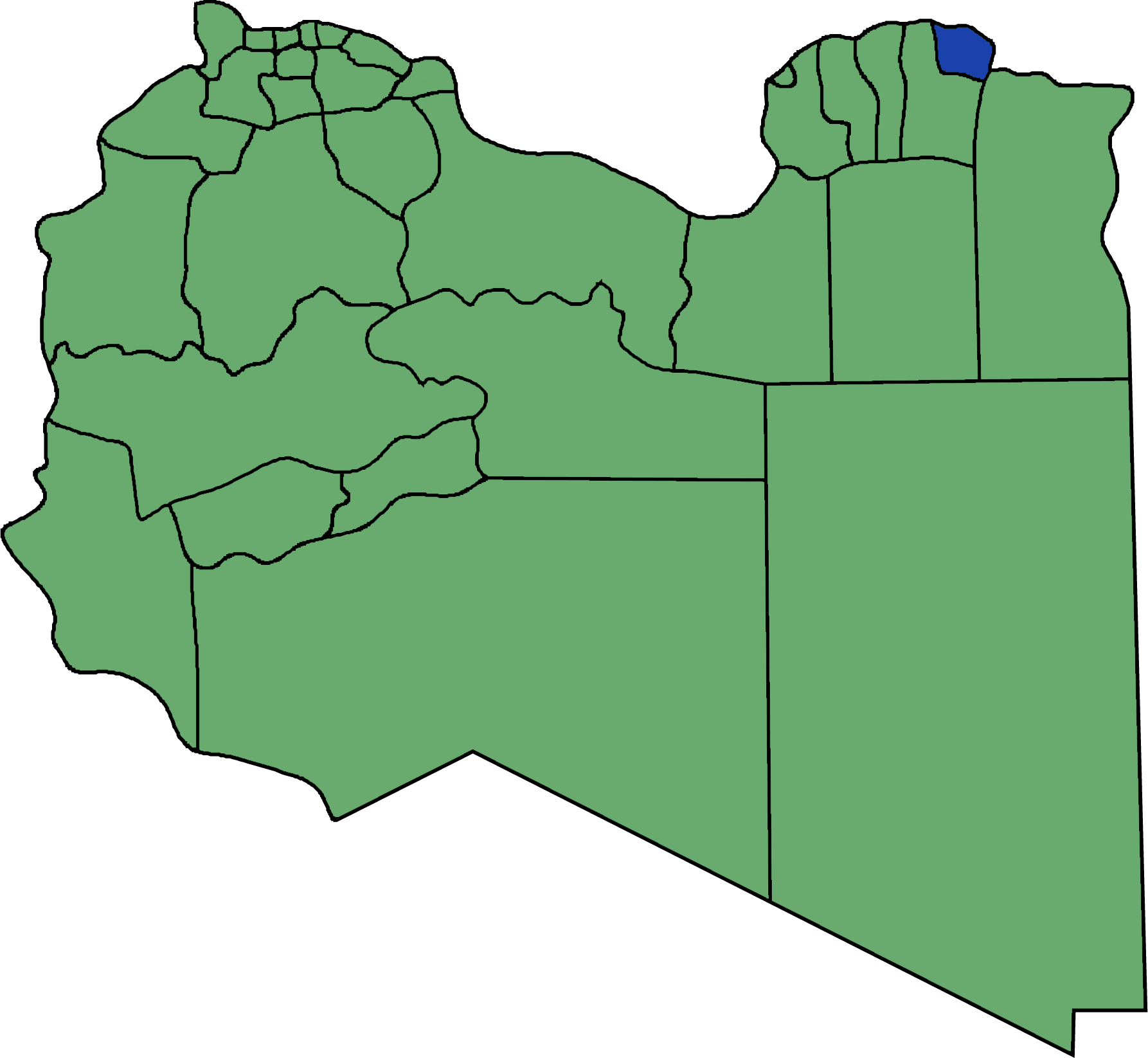
Map showing Derna District, 1998–2007

From 1998 to 2007, Derna District was smaller, including an area of 4,908 km^{2} (see map), and bordered the following districts, namely, Al Qubah in west and south and Butnan in southeast. Libya became independent in 1951 from the colonial empire and generally known for its oil rich resources. All the powers rested centrally with the President Gaddafi for 42 years till the 2011 armed rebellion which topple him. As per the constitution, Libya is the most decentralized Arab nation, but practically all powers are vested on central government on account of control over the oil revenues. Local governmental institutions manage the administration of education, industry, and communities. As a part of decentralization in 2012, the country is administratively split into 13 regions from the original 25 municipalities, which were further divided in 1,500 communes. Since 2015, the chief of the state is a Chairman of Presidential Council, while the Prime Minister is the head of the state. The House of Representatives is an elected body that is elected on universal suffrage and popular vote. As of 2016, there were 22 administrative divisions in the country in the form of districts.

== Demographics ==
Per the census of 2012, the total population in the region was 157,747 with 150,353 Libyans. The average size of the household in the country was 6.9, while the average household size of non-Libyans being 3.7. There were totally 22,713 households in the district, with 20,907 Libyan ones. The population density of the district was 1.86 persons per km^{2}. Per 2006 census, there were totally 56,607 economically active people in the district. There were 38,753 government employees, 2,850 employers, 21,996 first level workers and 042 second level workers. There were 17,448 workers in state administration, 1,496 in agriculture, animal husbandry and forestry, 1,667 in agriculture & hunting, 17,320 in education, 5,364 in private enterprises, 3,520 in health & social work, 2,629 in production, 18,549 in technical work and 808 service workers. The total enrollment in schools was 57,069 and the number of people above secondary stage and less than graduation was 3,310. As per the report from World Health Organization (WHO), there were one communicable disease centres, four dental clinics, one general clinics, two in-patient clinics, seven out-patient clinics, 38 pharmacies, 55 PHC centres, two polyclinics, two rural clinics and no specialized clinics. Islam is the state and major religion of the country.
