= List of buildings and structures in Libya =

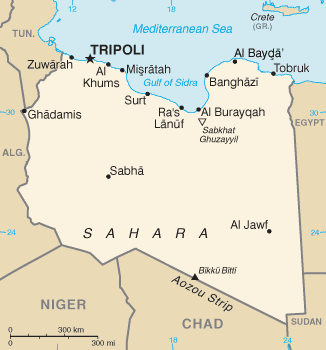
Map of Libya

This is a list of notable buildings and structures in Libya, organized by city:

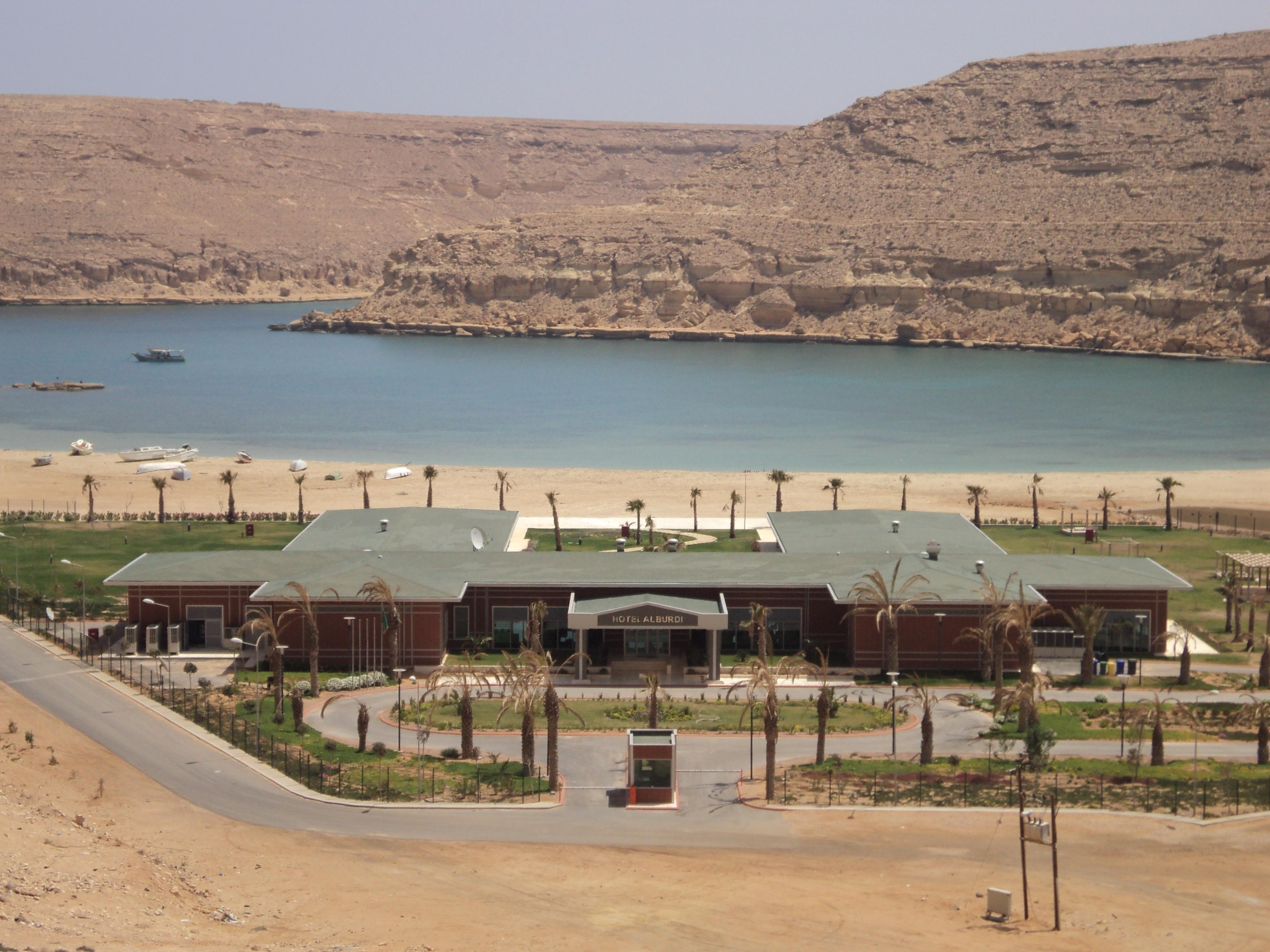
The Hotel Alburdi in Bardia

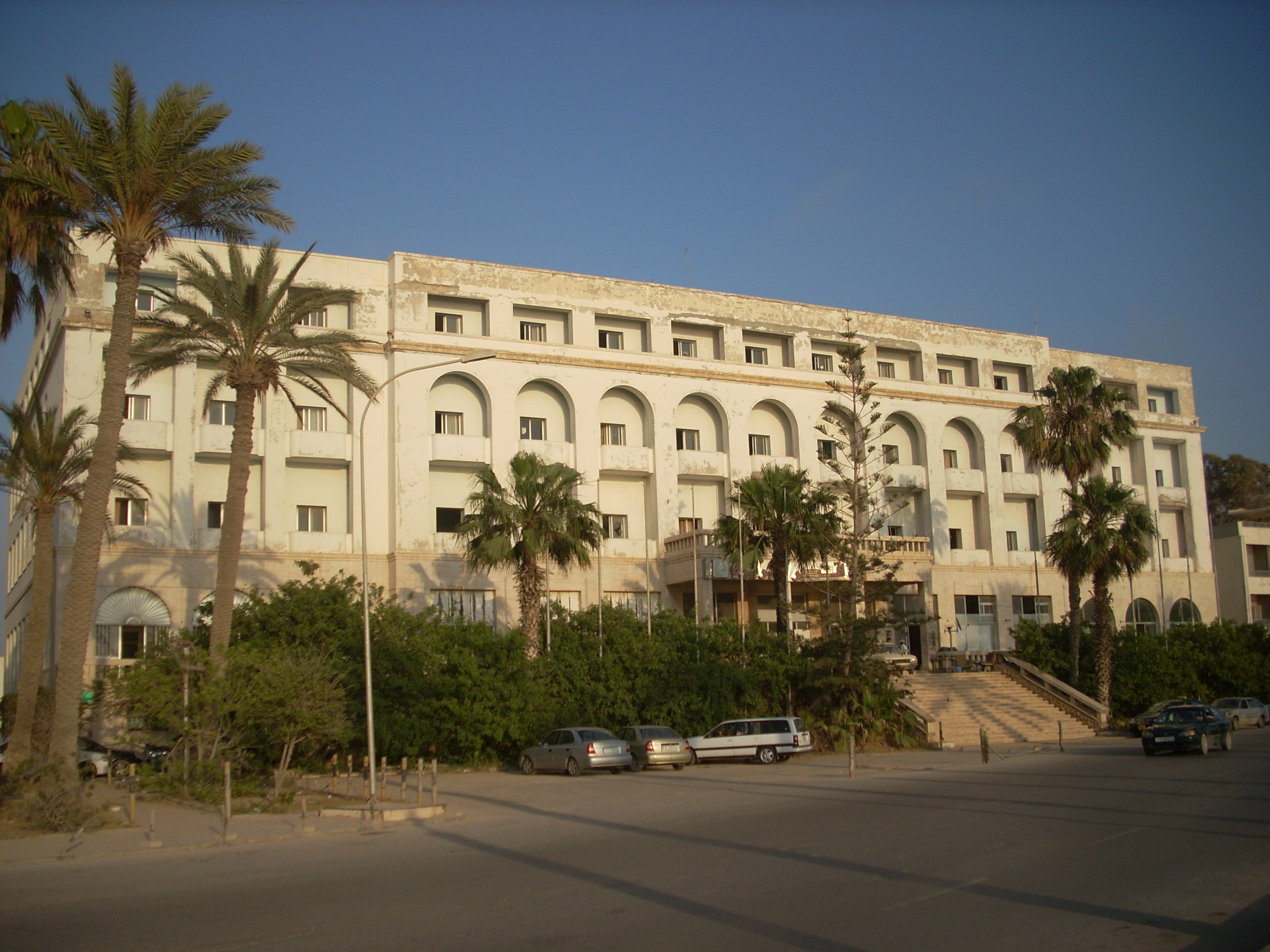
The Grand Hotel Benghazi in Benghazi

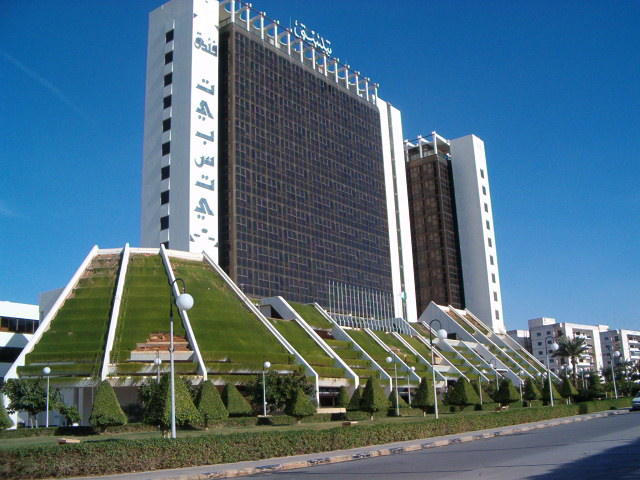
The Tibesti Hotel in Benghazi

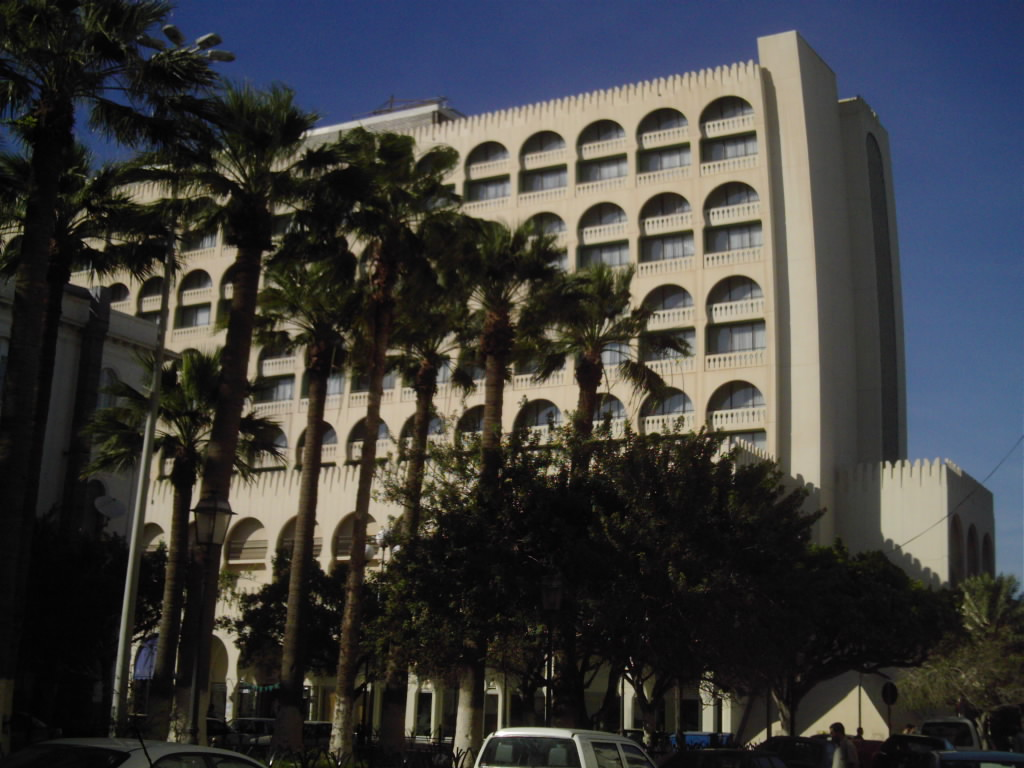
The Grand Hotel Tripoli in Tripoli

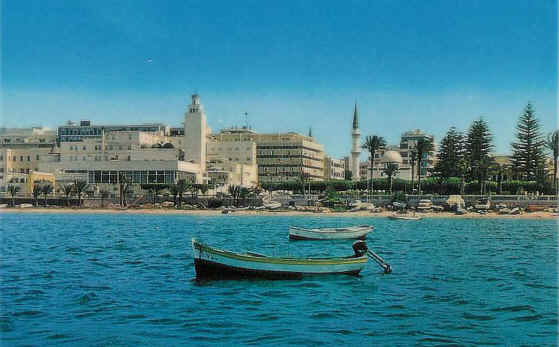
The Hotel Casinò Uaddan in Tripoli

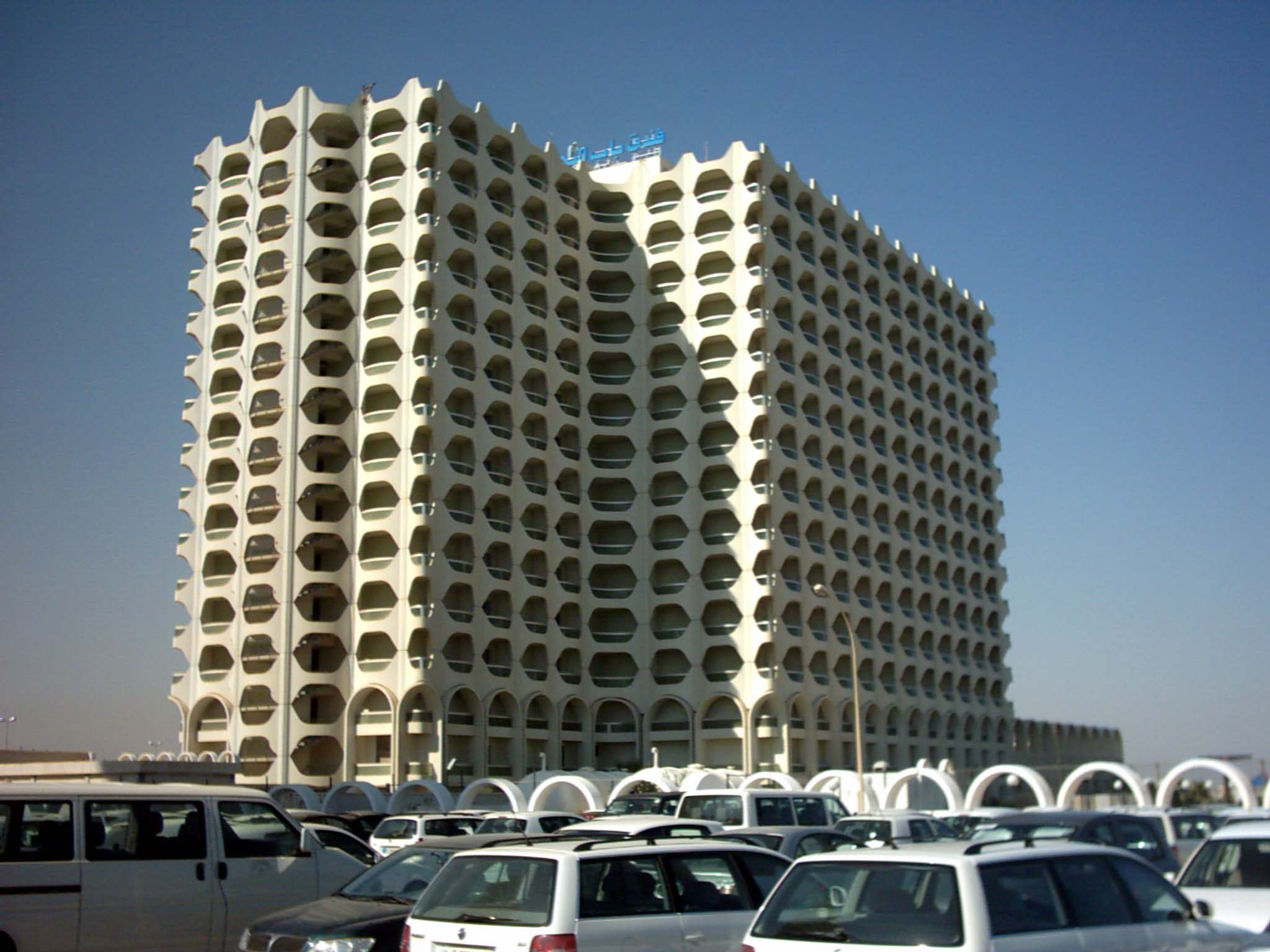
The Bab el Bahr Hotel in Tripoli

== Benghazi ==
- Grand Hotel Benghazi (also known as the Berenice Hotel)
- Tibesti Hotel
- Uzu Hotel (also known as the Ozoo or Ouzou Hotel)

== Tobruk ==
- Hotel Tobruk

== Tripoli ==
- 7 October Stadium
- Al Waddan Hotel
- Ali Alsgozy Stadium
- Bab al-Azizia
- Corinthia Hotel Tripoli
- Darghouth Turkish Bath
- Epigraphy Museum of Tripoli
- Ethnographic Museum of Tripoli
- GMR Stadium
- Gurgi Mosque
- Grand Hotel Tripoli (also known as the Al-Kabir Hotel or the Al Kabeer Hotel)
- Hotel Al Mehari
- Islamic Museum of Tripoli
- June 11 Stadium
- Karamanly House Museum
- Libyan Studies Center
- Mitiga International Airport
- National Archives of Libya
- Natural History Museum of Tripoli
- People's Hall
- Prehistory Museum of Tripoli
- Red Castle of Tripoli
- Royal Miramare Theatre
- Tripoli Cathedral
- Tripoli Central Hospital
- Tripoli International Airport

== See also ==
- List of museums in Libya
