= Germa Museum =

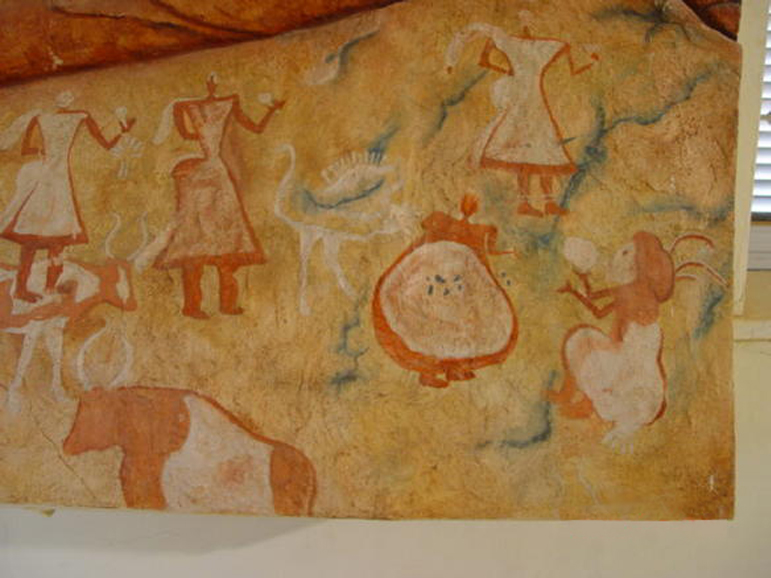
- Cave art exhibited at the Germa Museum

- Location within Libya
- Location: Fezzan, Libya
- Coordinates: 26°31′34″N 13°03′59″E
- Type: archaeological museum
- Collection size: Garamantian items

The Germa Museum is an archaeological museum located in Fezzan, Libya. It contains old objects excavated at Germa, the seat of the ancient Garamantian Kingdom. The Garamantian Kingdom flourished between 400 BC and 600 AD.

== See also ==
- Capitoline Temple
- Apollonia Museum
- Ghadames Museum
- List of museums in Libya
