= List of museums in Libya =

Libya has a long history and has been in contact with many other civilizations, from pre-historic age to the modern age, passing through so many ages such as: Garamantes, Greek, Roman, Islamic and many other ages.

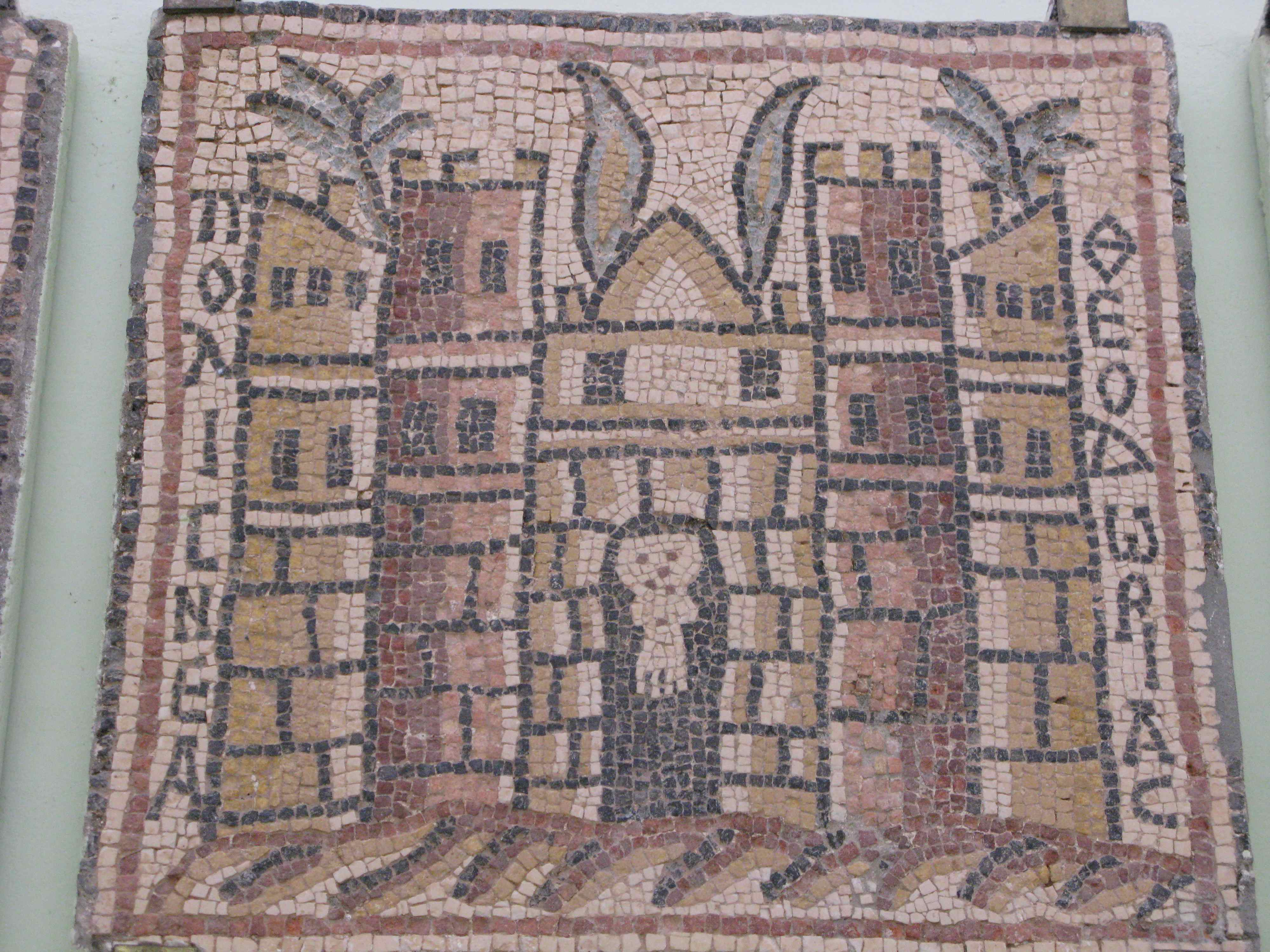
Mosaic commemorating the refounding of Olbia by Theodora in Qasr Libya Museum.

Name	City	Type	Year established	Coordinates
Bayda Museum	Bayda			
Apollonia Museum (also known as the Susa Museum)	Susa			
Benghazi Museum	Benghazi			
Cyrene Antiquity Museum	Cyrene			
Derna Museum	Derna			
Epigraphy Museum of Tripoli	Tripoli			
Ethnographic Museum of Tripoli	Tripoli			
Germa Museum	Fezzan			
Ghadames Museum	Ghadames			
Islamic Museum of Tripoli	Tripoli			
Janzour Museum	Janzur			
Karamanly House Museum	Tripoli	historic house		
Leptis Magna Museum	Khoms			
Museum of Libya				
Nalut Dinosaur Museum	Nalut			
Natural History Museum of Tripoli	Tripoli			
Prehistory Museum of Tripoli	Tripoli			
Punic Museum of Sabratha	Sabratha			
Qasr Libya Museum	Qasr Libya			
Red Castle Museum	Tripoli			
Roman Museum of Sabratha	Sabratha			
Sirte Museum	Sirte			
Taucheira Museum	Taucheira			
Tobruk Military Museum	Tobruk			
Tolmeita Museum	Tolmeita			
Trajan Baths Museum	Cyrene			
Zliten Museum	Zliten			

== See also ==
- List of buildings and structures in Libya
- List of museums
