= Public Library of Libya =

Public library in Banghazi, Libya

The Public Library of Libya is a public library in Libya, located in Benghazi. It had 14,000 volumes in 2002.

== See also ==
- National Archives of Libya
