= National Library of Libya =

- دار الكتب الوطنية - ليبيا
- 32°7′9.59″N 20°4′9.28″E
- Location: Benghazi, Libya
- Type: National Library
- Established: 1972

Collection
- Size: 150,000 volumes

The National Library of Libya (Arabic: دار الكتب الوطنية) is the national library of Libya, located in Benghazi. It holds 150,000 volumes. The national librarian is Mohamed A Eshoweihde.

== History ==
The national library was established in 1972, and holds books and scientific publications, theses and local periodicals. It contains rare books and reports issued by official government bodies, as well as archival documents that date several decades.

== See also ==
- National Archives of Libya
- List of national and state libraries
