= Libyan Government Library =

National library of Libya

The Libyan Government Library in Tripoli had 37,000 volumes in 2002.

== See also ==
- National Archives of Libya
