= Janzour Museum =

Coordinates: 32°49′42″N 13°01′39″E

- Location: Janzur, Libya
- Type: archaeological museum
- Collection size: funerary art

The Janzur Museum (also known as the Janzour Museum) is an archaeological museum located in Janzur, Libya. The museum showcases a funerary complex that is still under excavation by the Archaeology Department in Tripoli.

== Background ==
Janzur is located roughly 10km west of Tripoli. The cemetery was discovered there in 1958, with the museum being opened in 1973. There are a total of 22 tombs at the burial site.

The museum is unique in that it has been built around the original site of the cemetery to allow the tombs and archaeological finds to remain in-situ, rather than being removed once excavated. Unfortunately, it was discovered that many of the graves in the site have previously been robbed.

As well as the tombs, the museum contains pottery, glasswork and oil lamps found at the site.

== Tombs ==
The tombs at the museum date from between the first and fourth centuries AD. The tombs are grouped into three sections.

=== Punic Tombs ===
These tombs date from the first century AD. The tombs are rectangular and grouped by family, with steps to descend into each. The deceased are laid to rest surrounded by funerary items of value, including coins, pottery and jewellery.

=== Punic-Roman Tombs ===
Dating from the second century AD, these are similar to the Punic tombs. The Romans cremated their dead and stored the remains in jars, which in turn were buried.

=== Late Roman Tombs ===
Dating from the third and fourth century AD. These are a hole not much bigger than the size of the deceased, into which they would be placed on their back, before being covered with sand.

The room in which all the tombs were found contains a group of frescoes. There are several depicting animals chasing each other, (including a dog, antelope, lion, gazelle, hippo, wolf, and a bull). In addition, a number of figures including Proserpina, Pluto, Heracles (with Cerberus), and Charon in his boat, and a priest. The ceiling is also painted with angels.

== See also ==
- List of museums in Libya
