= Tibesti Hotel =

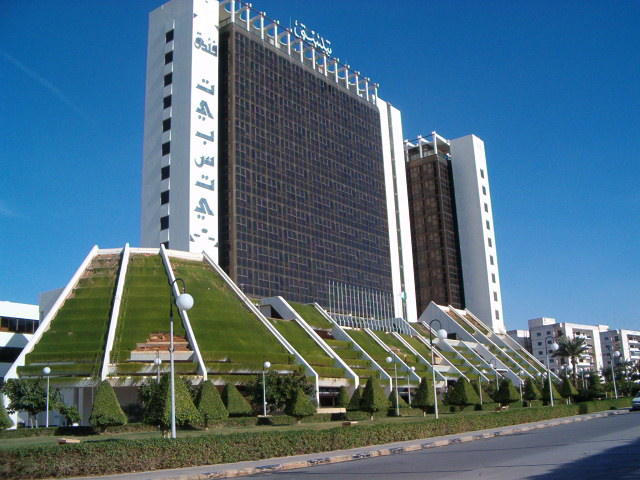
- Exterior of hotel (unknown date)
- Interactive map of the Tibesti Hotel area

General information
- Location: Benghazi, Libya
- Coordinates: 32°6′41.48″N 20°4′9.78″E

Technical details
- Floor count: 15

Other information
- Number of rooms: 242

Website
- tebistyhotel.com

The Tibesti Hotel is a hotel situated overlooking the harbour of the 23rd July Lake in the city centre of Benghazi, Libya.

== Description ==
At fifteen stories tall, it is a particularly prominent building with 242 rooms.

== 2011 bomb attack ==
On 1 June 2011, the hotel came to international attention during the Libyan Civil War when explosives were detonated in a car nearby. A spokesman for the National Transitional Council called the bombing a "cowardly act". It was suspected that an officer was killed, and many people started to shout chants against Muammar Gaddafi while the hotel was being cordoned off.

== See also ==
- List of buildings and structures in Libya
