= Leptis Magna Museum =

- Location: Khoms (Leptis Magna), Tripolitania, Libya
- Type: Archaeological museum
- Collection size: Roman era artifacts

Leptis Magna Museum is an archaeological museum located in Khoms (Leptis Magna), Tripolitania, Libya.

It contains evidence of people of different origins that once inhabited the city of leptis magna, including Berber, Punic, Phoenicians and Romans.

The remains preserved in the museum include statues of characters from numerous classical mythologies such as Zeus and Apollo statues. Adding to that tools and objects that show their day-to-day life habits such as metal work, pottery and jewelry.

== See also ==
- List of museums in Libya
