= Islamic Museum of Tripoli =

Islamic museum in Tripoli, Libya

- المتحف الإسلامي
- Established: To be determined, currently undergoing construction
- Location: Tripoli, Libya
- Coordinates: 32°52′39″N 13°10′58″E
- Type: Islamic-culture museum
- Website: islammit.4t.com (in Arabic)

The Islamic Museum of Tripoli (Arabic: المتحف الإسلامي) is a proposed museum of Islamic culture that was built under the support and patronage of Saif al-Islam Gaddafi in Tripoli, Libya.

== History ==
The original building was built in the 1800s under the Turkish governor Ali Pasha Al Garamalli, whose tenure lasted from 1832 until 1835. It originally served as a country home for Turkish nobles. After the governor's death, the building was abandoned until the end of the century.

During the Italian occupation of Libya, the building was owned by Giuseppe Volpi and subsequently his daughter, Anna Maria Cicogna Mozzoni Volpi.

The property eventually fell under the ownership of the Libyan Department of Antiquities, with the intentions of making it the first Islamic Museum of Libya.

== Location ==
The museum's building-reuse project stands in the al Sur area, in Shari' Sidi Khaliffa, Tripoli.

== 2011 Libyan civil war ==
In May 2011 it was reported that construction on – and acquisitions for – had been halted; the museum was scheduled to open in September 2011 to celebrate the anniversary of Muammar Gaddafi's rise to power. It was due to be housed in a summer palace built for the Ottoman Yusuf Pasha in the 18th century.

The results of the Battle of Tripoli in August 2011, with the later arrest of Saif al-Islam Gaddafi, altered the museum's opening date and festivities. Hafed Walda, Cultural Counsellor of the regime, confirmed that the project was on hold and that the future of the collection was not ensured. Meanwhile, no attempts of looting the collection were reported, though the seeming patron-less future of the collection was uncertain.

== Restoration ==
As of 2025, the building is being restored by Studio Italia Costruzioni.

== See also ==
- List of museums of Islamic art
- List of museums in Libya
- Red Castle Museum
