= Ghadames Museum =

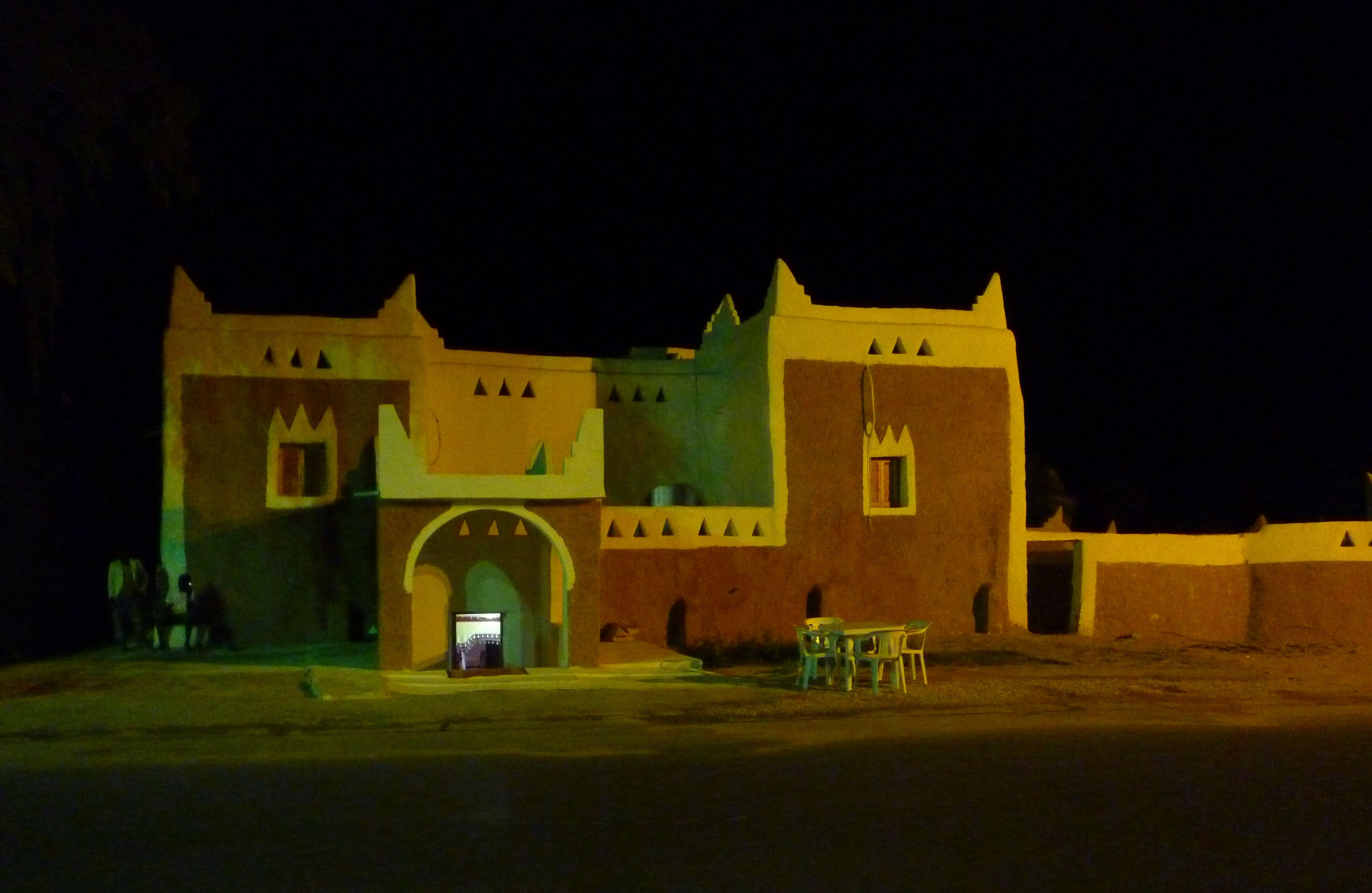
- Location: Ghadames, Libya
- Coordinates: 30°07′54″N 9°29′42″E
- Type: archaeological museum
- Collection size: Berber items, Roman era art

The Ghadames Museum is an archaeological museum located in Ghadames, Libya.

== Data ==
With its multiple wings, the museum specializes in Berber history and area wildlife. It includes archaeological remains from Ghadames dating to the Roman period, when it was named Cydamus. There are some column bases of a Roman temple in a section of the Museum.

Columns of the Christian church of Cydamus still remain in the "Sīdī Badrī" Mosque (the oldest in Libya): one is expected to be moved inside the Ghadames Museum.

The museum is one of the most visited places in the city by tourists.

== See also ==
- Cydamus
- Capitoline Temple
- List of museums in Libya
- Treasury of Cyrene

== Bibliography ==
- Edmond Bernet (1912). "Ghadames". En Tripolitaine: Voyage a Ghadames (in French). Paris: Fontemoing.
- Lafi (Nora) "Ghadamès cité-oasis entre empire ottoman et colonisation"" in Federico Cresti (ed.), La Libia tra Mediterraneo e mondo islamico, Giuffrè, pp. 55–70, 2006
