= Museum of Libya =

Museum in Tripoli, Libya

Coordinates: 32°53′16.03″N 13°11′21.87″E

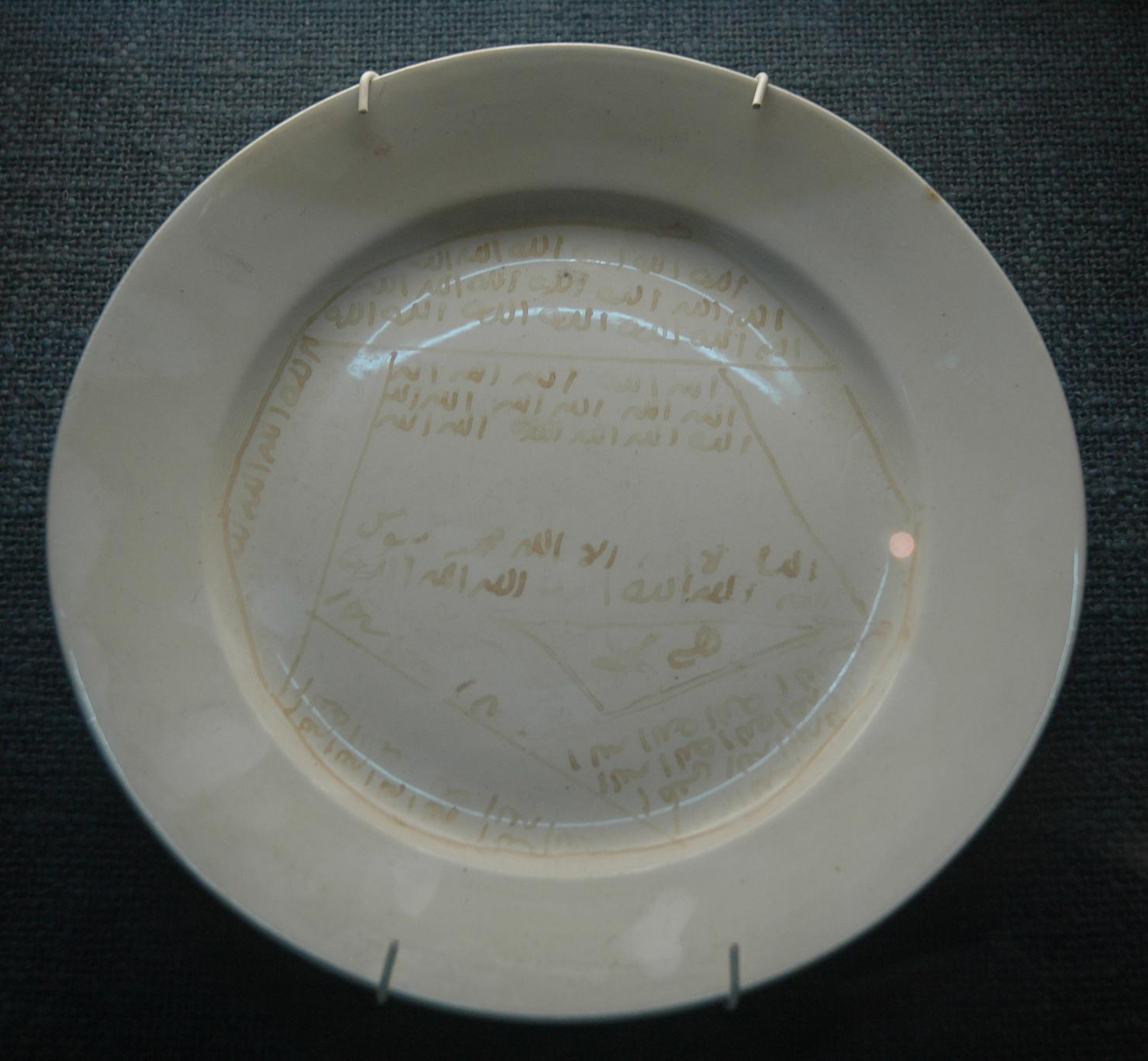
- Arabic Islamic writing on a plate on display at the National Museum in Tripoli, Libya.
- Location: Tripoli, Libya
- Type: Islamic art

The Museum of Libya is a museum located in Tripoli, Libya. It was originally built as the Royal Palace, completed in 1939. It was later used by King Idris during his reign. It then became known as the "People's Palace" after the fall of Muammar Gaddafi.

In modern times, it is a multimedia museum focused on "Edutainment". Most projection screens are walls of fog being generated from above from tap water, allowing visitors to walk straight through them.

The museum closed in 2011 during the Libyan Civil War, during which its artefacts were removed from display to prevent looting and hidden in sealed rooms. It reopened in 2025 following a six-year renovation program in which the Government of National Unity spent $5 million, with the help of the French archaeological mission to Libya and the ALIPH foundation. Artifacts are in the process of being returned from several countries, including the United States, Spain, and Austria.

The museum's collections include a natural history exhibition, Greek and Roman antiquities and Ottoman-era weapons and jewellery, and an exhibit dedicated to the Roman emperor Septimius Severus, who was born in the ancient Libyan city of Leptis Magna. It also includes several mummies recovered from archaeological sites across the country, including a 5,400-year-old mummified child, found in Uan Muhuggiag. The mummy has suffered under improper conservation and rolling blackouts during the Libyan Civil War, leading to deterioration. Outside professionals previously tried to have the mummy sent to be properly conserved, but lacked funding at the time, though there is renewed hope with the recent re-opening of the museum.

== See also ==
- List of museums in Libya
- Idris of Libya
