= Radisson Blu Al Mahary Hotel Tripoli =

Hotel in Tripoli, Libya

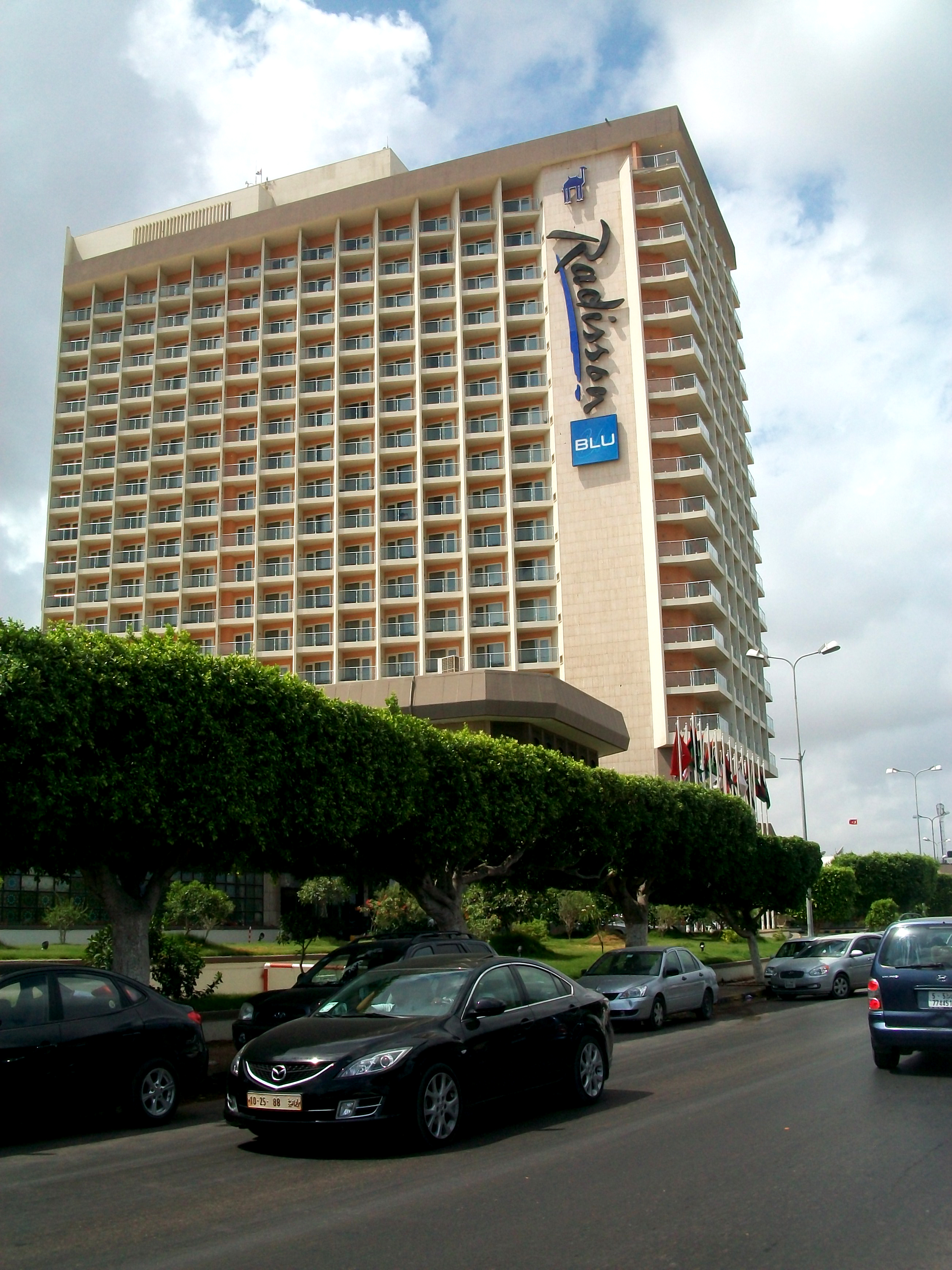
- Interactive map of the Radisson Blu Al Mahary Hotel Tripoli area

General information
- Location: Elfatah Street, Tripoli, Libya
- Coordinates: 32°53′44″N 13°12′1″E
- Opening: 1989
- Operator: Radisson Hotels

Website
- https://www.radissonhotels.com/en-us/hotels/radisson-blu-tripoli-al-mahary

The Radisson Blu Al Mahary Hotel Tripoli is a five-star hotel in Tripoli, Libya, near Grand Hotel Tripoli.

== History ==
It was built in 1989 and completely remodeled in 2009 to international standards as part of Radisson Hotels. The hotel was briefly closed in 2011 following the outbreak of the Libyan Civil War, but reopened a few months later under local management. In 2012, Carlson Rezidor (currently Radisson Hotel Group) returned to operate the hotel. As of 2026, it and Corinthia Hotel Tripoli remain the only two international chain hotels present in Libya.

It is located on the site of the earlier Italian Hotel del Mehari , built in 1935 at the same time as the nearby Hotel Casinò Uaddan.

Like the Uaddan, it was designed by Italian architect Florestano Di Fausto, with the collaboration of Stefano Gatti-Casazza. According to Brian McLaren in his book Architecture and tourism in Italian colonial Libya, the destroyed Mehari hotel "provided a fusion of the indigenous architecture of Tripoli with a modern aesthetic that responded to the demand for a metropolitan standard of comfort, typical to colonial tourism.

== See also ==
- Grand Hotel Tripoli
- Hotel Casinò Uaddan
