= Al Waddan Hotel =

Hotel in Tripoli, Libya

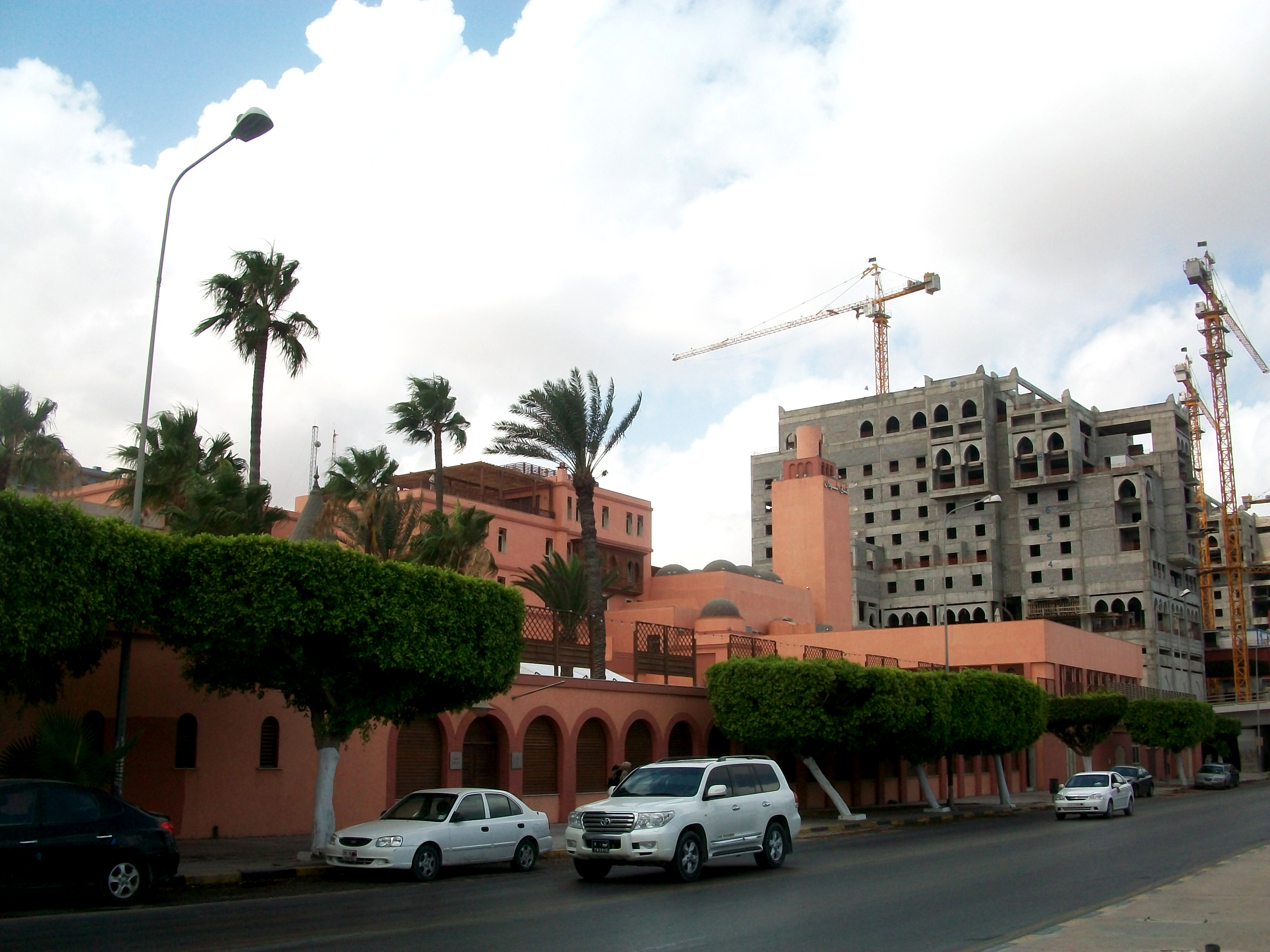
- Back view of the Al Waddan Hotel

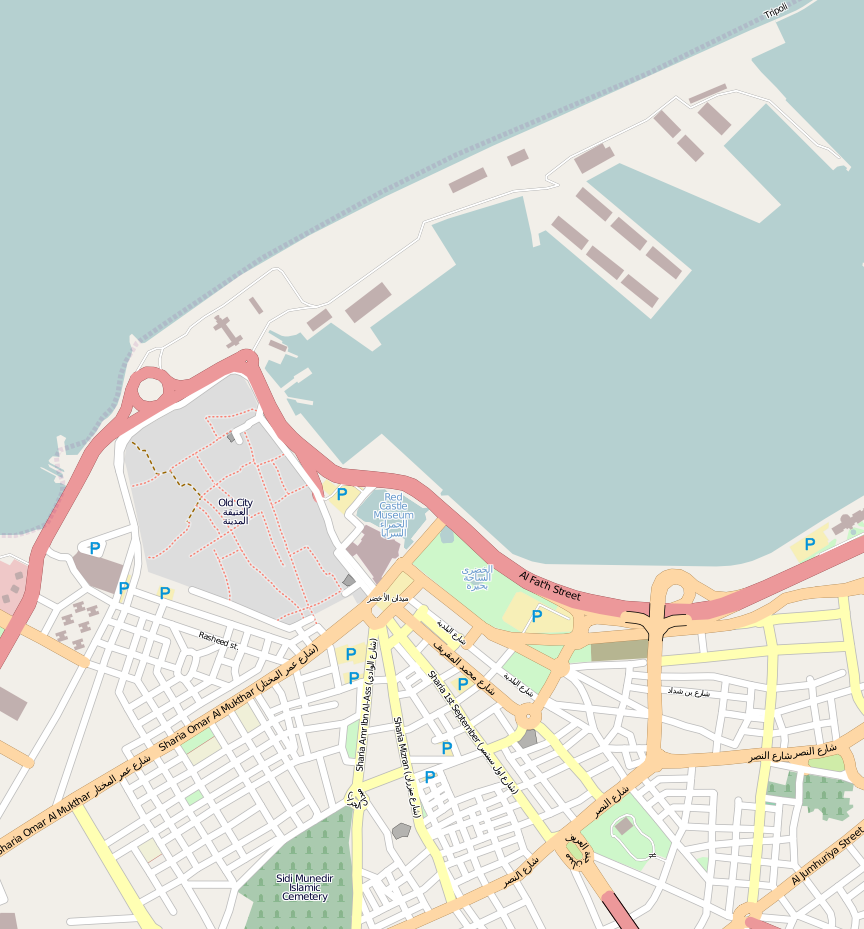
- Location within Tripoli, Libya

General information
- Location: Tripoli, Libya
- Coordinates: 32°53′36″N 13°11′28″E
- Opening: 1935

Design and construction
- Architect: Florestano Di Fausto

The Al Waddan Hotel opened in 1936 as the Italian Uaddan Hotel & Casino.

== History ==
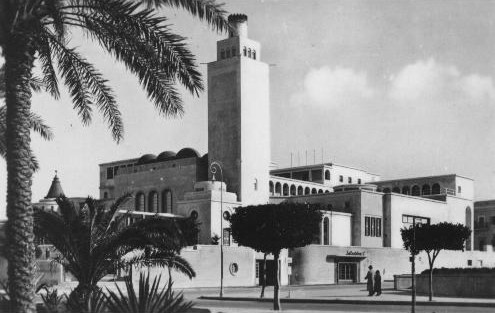
Hotel Casinò Uaddan in the 1950s

It is a historic hotel in Tripoli, Libya, located overlooking the bay, just east of Grand Hotel Tripoli. Historically it was the grandest hotel in Tripoli and was referenced by an American journalist as being "the Waldorf Astoria of Tripoli" and was named "a jewel of modern African architecture". It was built in 1935 at the same time as the Hotel Al Mehari.

It was designed by Italian architect Florestano Di Fausto, with the collaboration of Stefano Gatti-Casazza. It contained a casino and a 500-seat theatre.

It was completely restored at a cost of $16 million from 2007 to 2009 as an international luxury hotel and was managed for a number of years by InterContinental Hotels Group.

== See also ==
- Grand Hotel Tripoli
- Hotel Al Mehari
