= Cyrene Antiquity Museum =

- متحف المنحوتات في شحات
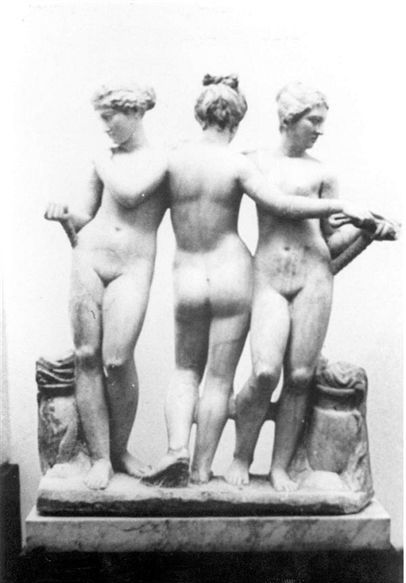
- The three graces in Cyrene Antiquity Museum
- Location: Shahhat, Libya
- Coordinates: 32°49′3.500″N 21°51′51.001″E
- Type: Archaeological museum
- Collection size: Archaic Greece and Roman era artifacts

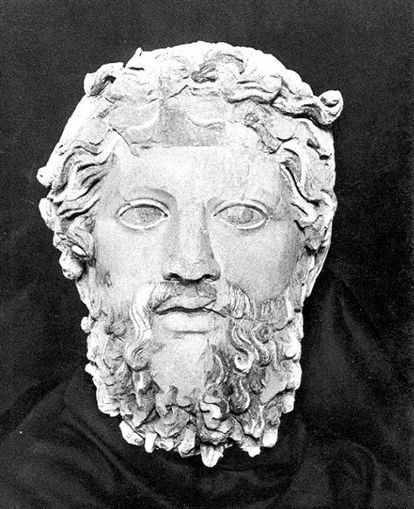
Head of Zeus (Cyrene Antiquity Museum)

Cyrene Antiquity Museum is an archaeological museum located in Shahhat, Libya. It contains several statues and mosaics from the ancient Greek and later Roman city Cyrene.

According to a multi level research, four out of 200 statues at Cyrene Antiquity museum have previously been identified as dolomitic marble from the northern Aegean island of Thasos.

== List of statues ==
- Head of Athena
- Kore
- Statues of Thalia (Grace)

== See also ==
- List of museums in Libya
