= Ghadames =

Ghadames غدامس
- Town
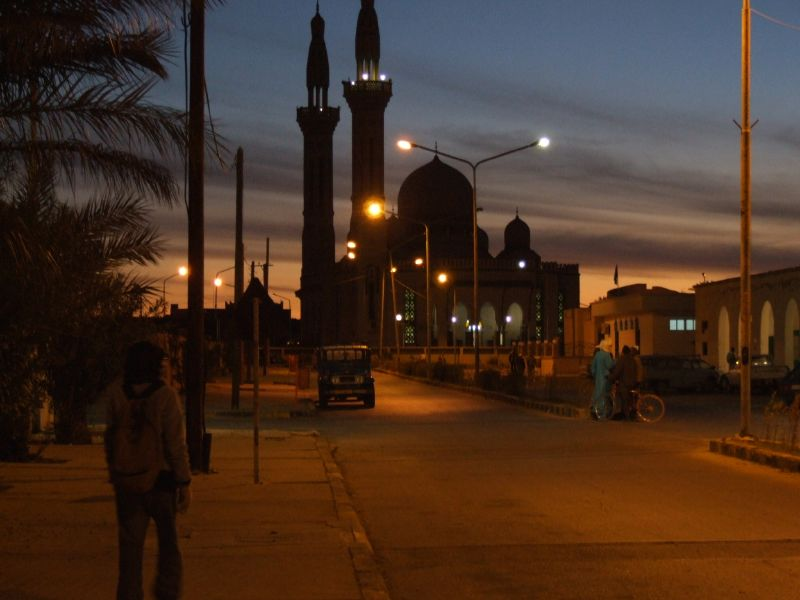
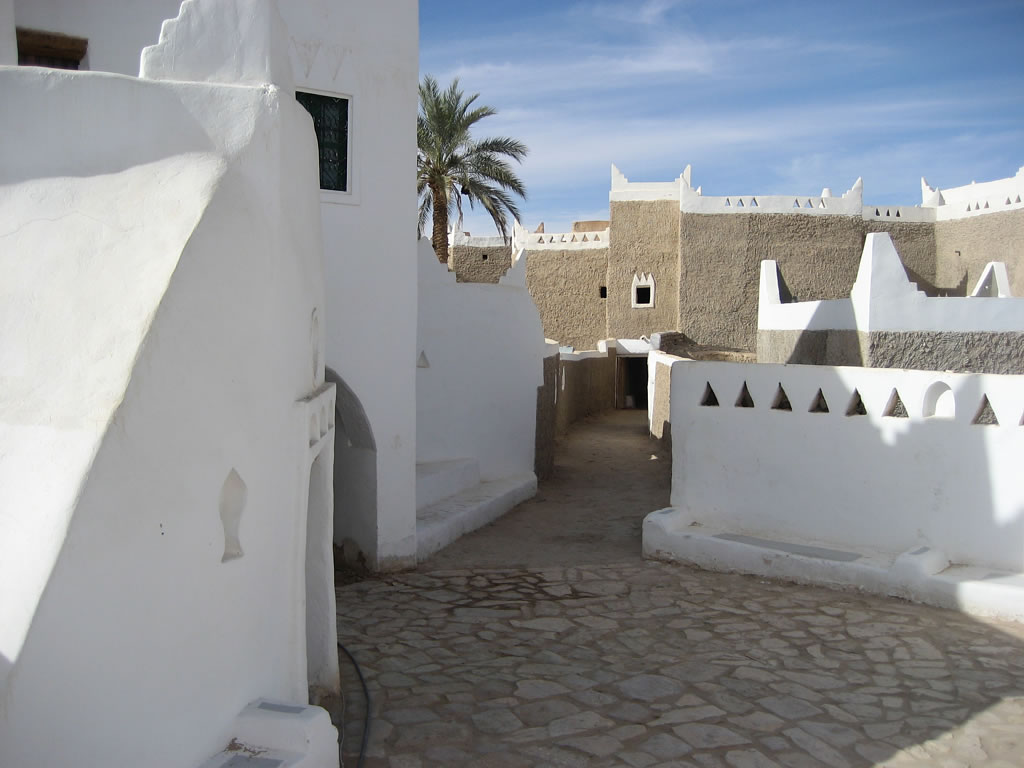
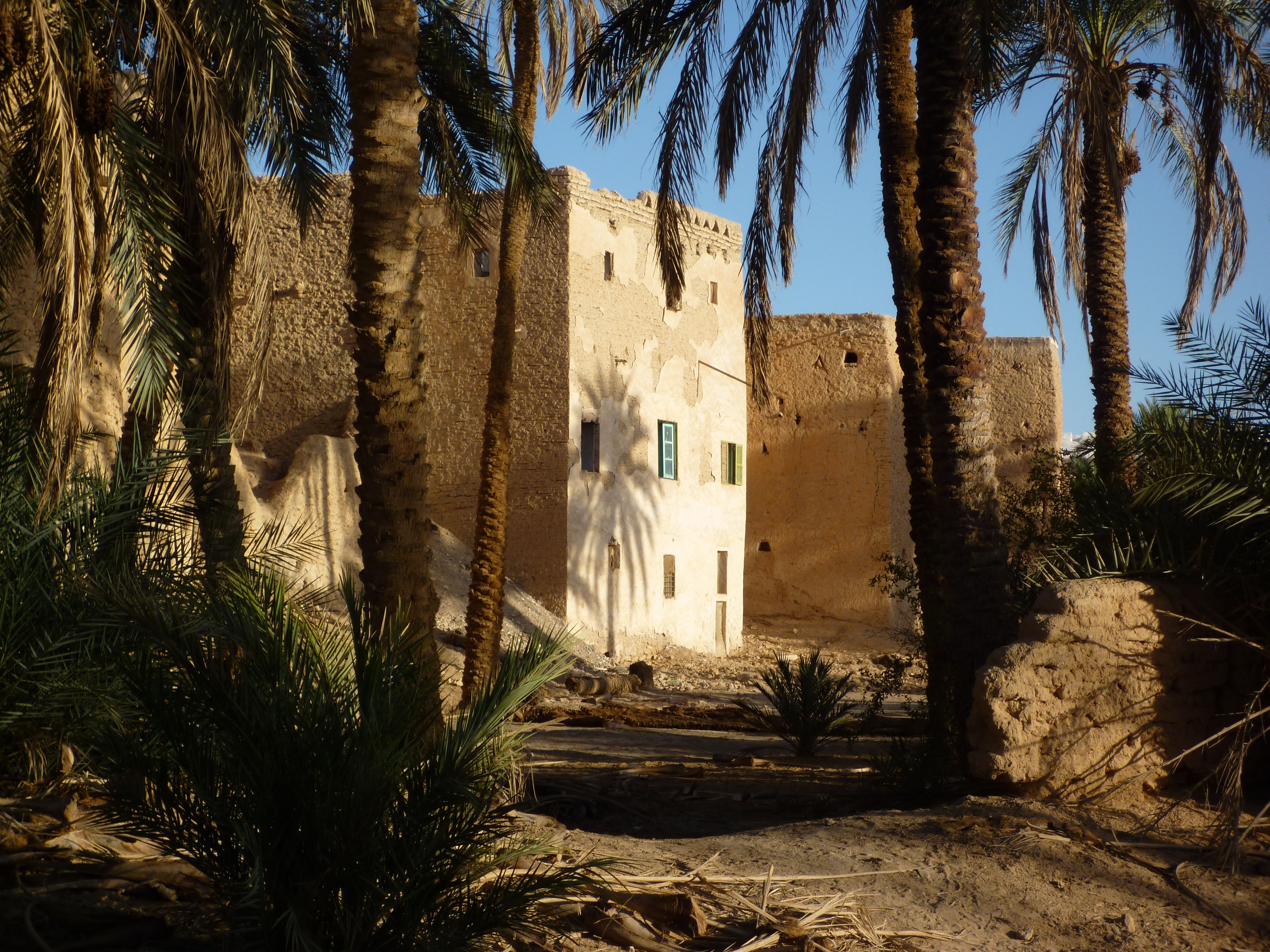
- Clockwise from top: Ghadames Mosque, Old Town, Old Town street view
- Interactive map of Ghadames
- Location in Libya
- Coordinates: 30°8′N 9°30′E
- Country: Libya
- Region: Tripolitania
- District: Nalut
- Elevation: 1,932 ft (589 m)

Population
  - Estimate (2011): 10,000
- Time zone: UTC+2 (EET)
- License Plate Code: 17

UNESCO World Heritage Site
- Official name: Old Town of Ghadamès
- Type: Cultural
- Criteria: v
- Designated: 1986
- Reference no.: 362
- Region: Arab States

Ghadames or Ghadamis /ɡəˈdæmɪs/ (Ghadamsi: ⵄⴰⴷⴻⵎⴻⵙ / Ɛadēməs [ʕadeːməs], Arabic: غدامس, Italian: Gadames) is an oasis town in the Nalut District of the Tripolitania region in northwestern Libya.

Ghadames, known as 'the pearl of the desert', stands in an oasis. It is one of the oldest pre-Saharan cities and an example of a traditional settlement. Its domestic architecture is characterized by a vertical division of functions: the ground floor used to store supplies; the first floor is for the family, overhanging covered alleys that create what is almost an underground network of passageways; and, at the top, open-air terraces reserved for the women.

== Geography ==
Ghadames lies roughly 462 km (287 mi) to the southwest of Tripoli, near the borders with Algeria and Tunisia. Ghadames borders Illizi Province, Algeria and Tataouine Governorate, Tunisia.

The oasis has a population of around 10,000, mainly Berbers. The old part of the town, which is surrounded by a city wall, has been declared a UNESCO World Heritage site. Each of the seven clans that used to live in this part of the town had its own district, of which each had a public place where festivals could be held.

== Climate ==
Ghadames has a hot desert climate (Köppen climate classification BWh) with hot summers as average high temperature is around 41°C (105.8°F) in July, the hottest month of the year, as well as cool winters (with high diurnal variation). The town receives little precipitation throughout the year as average annual precipitation is only 73.1 mm (1.30 in).

Climate data for Ghadames (1991–2020, extremes 1913–2020)
Month	Jan	Feb	Mar	Apr	May	Jun	Jul	Aug	Sep	Oct	Nov	Dec	Year
Record high °C (°F)	29.0 (84.2)	37.5 (99.5)	38.8 (101.8)	44.0 (111.2)	45.3 (113.5)	47.0 (116.6)	48.0 (118.4)	47.5 (117.5)	45.0 (113.0)	43.3 (109.9)	38.0 (100.4)	33.0 (91.4)	48.0 (118.4)
Mean daily maximum °C (°F)	18.2 (64.8)	20.7 (69.3)	25.3 (77.5)	30.5 (86.9)	35.7 (96.3)	39.7 (103.5)	41.5 (106.7)	40.8 (105.4)	37.7 (99.9)	32.1 (89.8)	24.4 (75.9)	19.0 (66.2)	30.5 (86.9)
Daily mean °C (°F)	11.4 (52.5)	13.7 (56.7)	18.1 (64.6)	22.9 (73.2)	27.9 (82.2)	31.7 (89.1)	33.4 (92.1)	32.9 (91.2)	30.3 (86.5)	24.9 (76.8)	17.5 (63.5)	12.5 (54.5)	23.1 (73.6)
Mean daily minimum °C (°F)	4.6 (40.3)	6.7 (44.1)	10.9 (51.6)	15.4 (59.7)	20.2 (68.4)	23.7 (74.7)	25.2 (77.4)	25.0 (77.0)	22.9 (73.2)	17.7 (63.9)	10.6 (51.1)	5.9 (42.6)	15.7 (60.3)
Record low °C (°F)	−2.0 (28.4)	−3.0 (26.6)	1.5 (34.7)	3.4 (38.1)	9.8 (49.6)	14.4 (57.9)	17.0 (62.6)	16.7 (62.1)	11.5 (52.7)	7.5 (45.5)	−1.0 (30.2)	−2.5 (27.5)	−3.0 (26.6)
Average precipitation mm (inches)	4.9 (0.19)	5.2 (0.20)	5.3 (0.21)	2.4 (0.09)	1.8 (0.07)	0.5 (0.02)	0.0 (0.0)	0.2 (0.01)	2.9 (0.11)	3.0 (0.12)	3.2 (0.13)	4.8 (0.19)	34.2 (1.35)
Average precipitation days (≥ 1.0 mm)	0.8	0.8	0.8	0.5	0.4	0.0	0.0	0.0	0.4	0.6	0.7	0.9	5.9
Average relative humidity (%)	52	41	36	28	26	22	22	23	29	35	47	53	34
Mean monthly sunshine hours	248.0	240.1	257.3	273.0	313.1	309.0	372.0	353.4	273.0	263.5	246.0	232.5	3,380.9
Mean daily sunshine hours	8.0	8.5	8.3	9.1	10.1	10.3	12.0	11.4	9.1	8.5	8.2	7.5	9.3
Source 1: NOAA
Source 2: Deutscher Wetterdienst (extremes and humidity), Arab Meteorology Book (sun only)

== History ==
=== Ancient eras ===
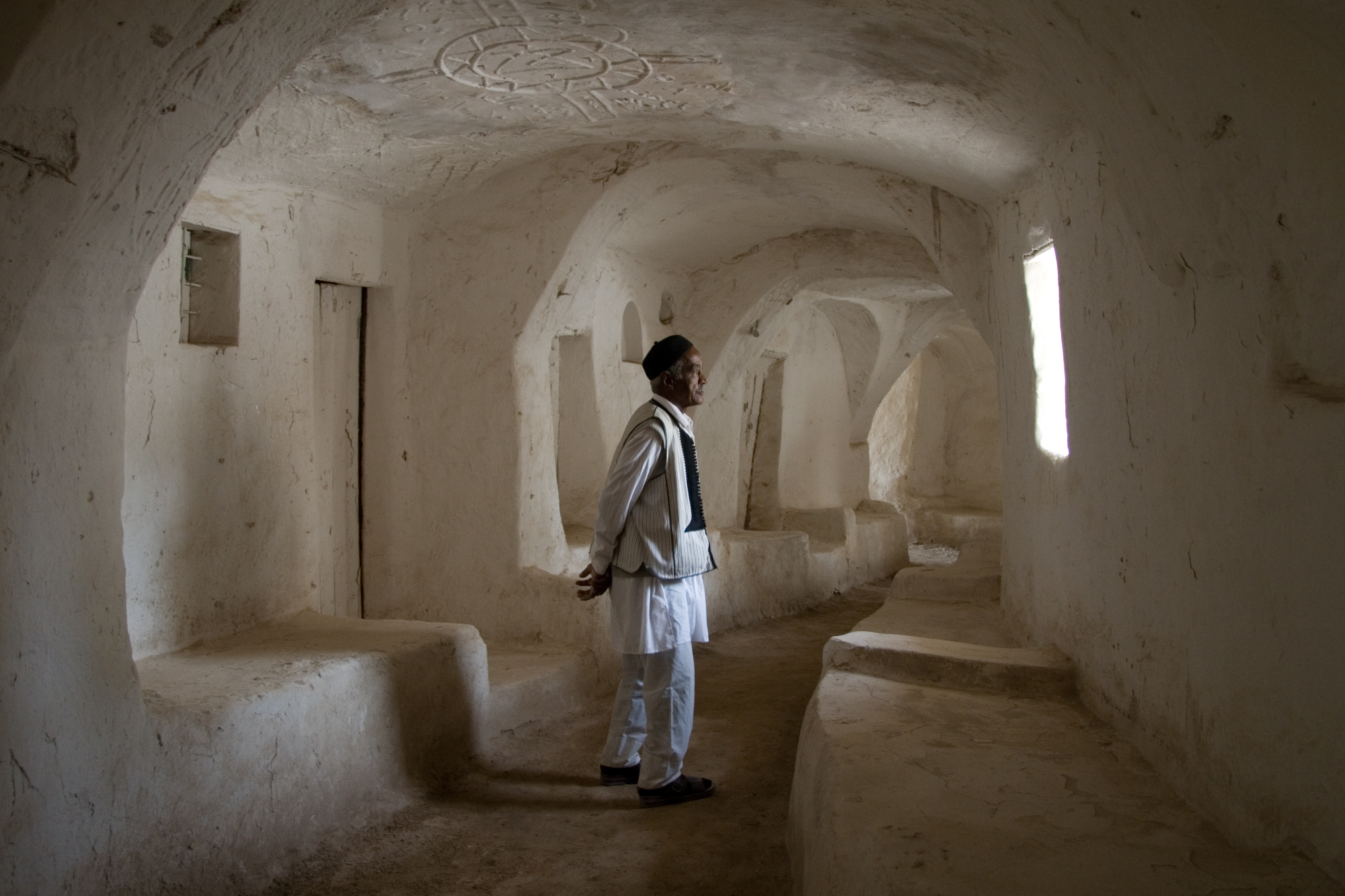
Houses in Ghadames are made of mud, lime, and palm tree trunks with covered alleyways between them to offer good shelter against summer heat.

It has been suggested, based on archaeological evidence, that this area has been settled since the 4th millennium B.C., and is one of the oldest pre-Saharan settlements. Its situation near a water source in the middle of a desert would have made it an important spot for anyone seeking to settle in the area.

The first written records about Ghadames date from the Roman period when the settlement was known as Cydamus, from which modern Ghadames derives its name. In the 1st century BC, the Roman proconsul Lucius Cornelius Balbus invaded Cydamus during the reign of emperor Augustus. A permanent Roman garrison was established during the reign of Septimius Severus, and the emperor may have visited the settlement around AD 202. However, the Romans withdrew from the area a few decades later during the Crisis of the Third Century.

During the 6th century, a bishop lived in the oasis, after the population had been converted to Christianity by Byzantine missionaries. It became a stronghold of the Donatist heresy until its conquest by Muslim Arabs.

During the late 7th century, Ghadames was ruled by the Muslim Arabs. The population quickly converted to Islam and Ghadames played an important role as base for the Trans-Saharan trade until the 19th century.

The 12th century geographer Abu Hamid al-Gharnati included Ghadamis among the countries of Sudan (i.e., countries of black people), a hypothesis that Saad considers possible, as Ghadamis always had settlers representing him in Timbuktu.

Ghadamis was an important town in the trans-Saharan slave trade.

=== Etymology ===
The etymology of the name Ghadames is very closely linked with its history. It is believed that the name Ghadames is originally connected to the name of the ancient Berber tribe of Tidamensi, a tribe from Fezzan. It is also believed that the name Tidamensi was corrupted by the invading Romans to form the name Cydamus, which in turn gave way to the name Ghadames.

=== 1900s–present ===
In October 1911, shortly after the Italo-Turkish War broke out, Ghadames was occupied by Italian soldiers marching from Tripoli. However, Italy's hold on the city was interrupted several times until June 1915, when a general rising throughout Libya caused the Italian garrison to retreat from Ghadames to the stronghold of Tripoli. Effective control over the city was restored in December 1918, but rebellion throughout Fezzan kept Ghadames in a state of emergency until 1923.

In 1943, Free French forces occupied Ghadames and its surrounding area in the southern part of the former Italian colony of Libya, forming the Military Territory of Fezzan-Ghadames until Libyan independence in 1951. Ghadames was made the territory's capital during this time.

In the 1970s, the government built new houses outside of the old part of the town. However, many inhabitants return to the old part of the town during the summer, as its architecture provides better protection against the heat.

That same time, director Moustapha Akkad chose Ghadames as a filming location for interior scenes of the city of Medina in The Message, an Islamic epic drama film.

During the Libyan Civil War, National Transitional Council forces entered the town on 30 August 2011, which had been under siege by NTC forces since the beginning of the conflict. Until 2011, the city was under control by independent Tuareg troops. After being captured by the Libyan National Army, the entire Tuareg community was forced to flee in an act of ethnic cleansing.

== Old Town of Ghadames ==
The old town, inscribed in 1986 as a UNESCO World Heritage site, was de-populated of its inhabitants throughout the 1990s, leaving the old buildings at risk of collapse due to a lack of maintenance. It was listed on the List of World Heritage in Danger between 2016 and 2025, among four other sites in Libya, because of damage caused by the Libyan Civil War affecting the country and the threat of further damage it poses.

=== Gallery ===
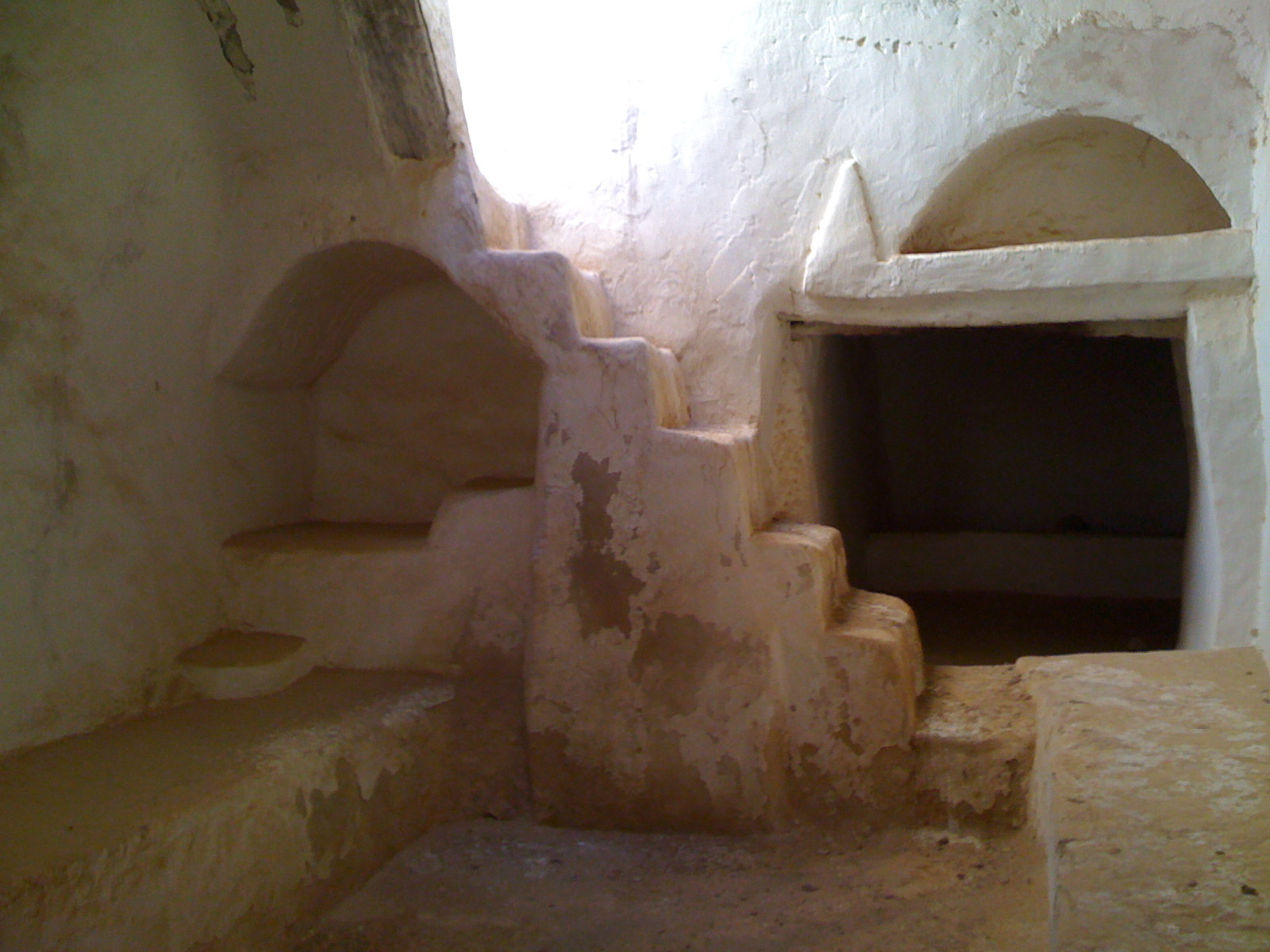
Inside view of a small dwelling

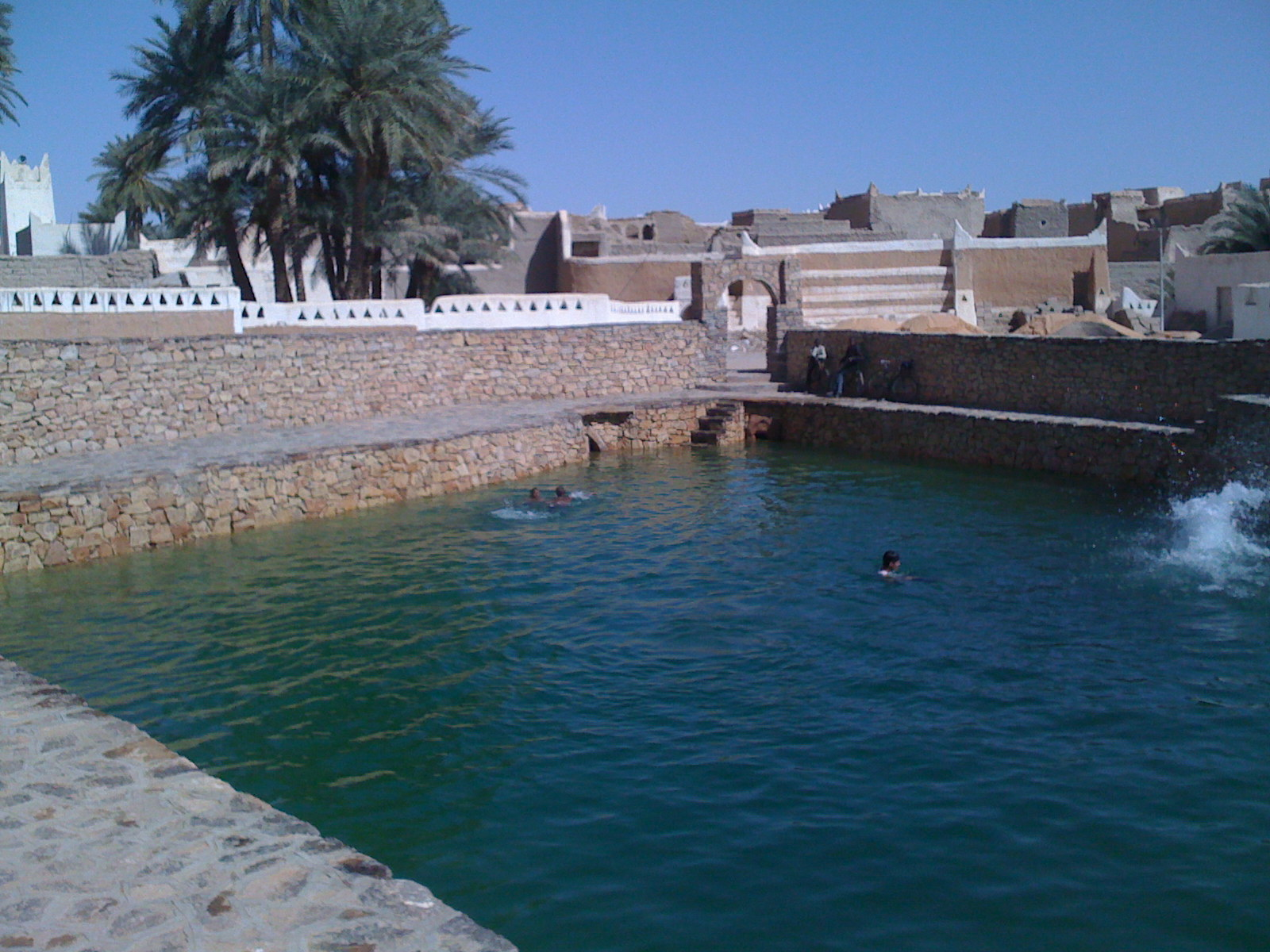
Old Town Spring Water Pool

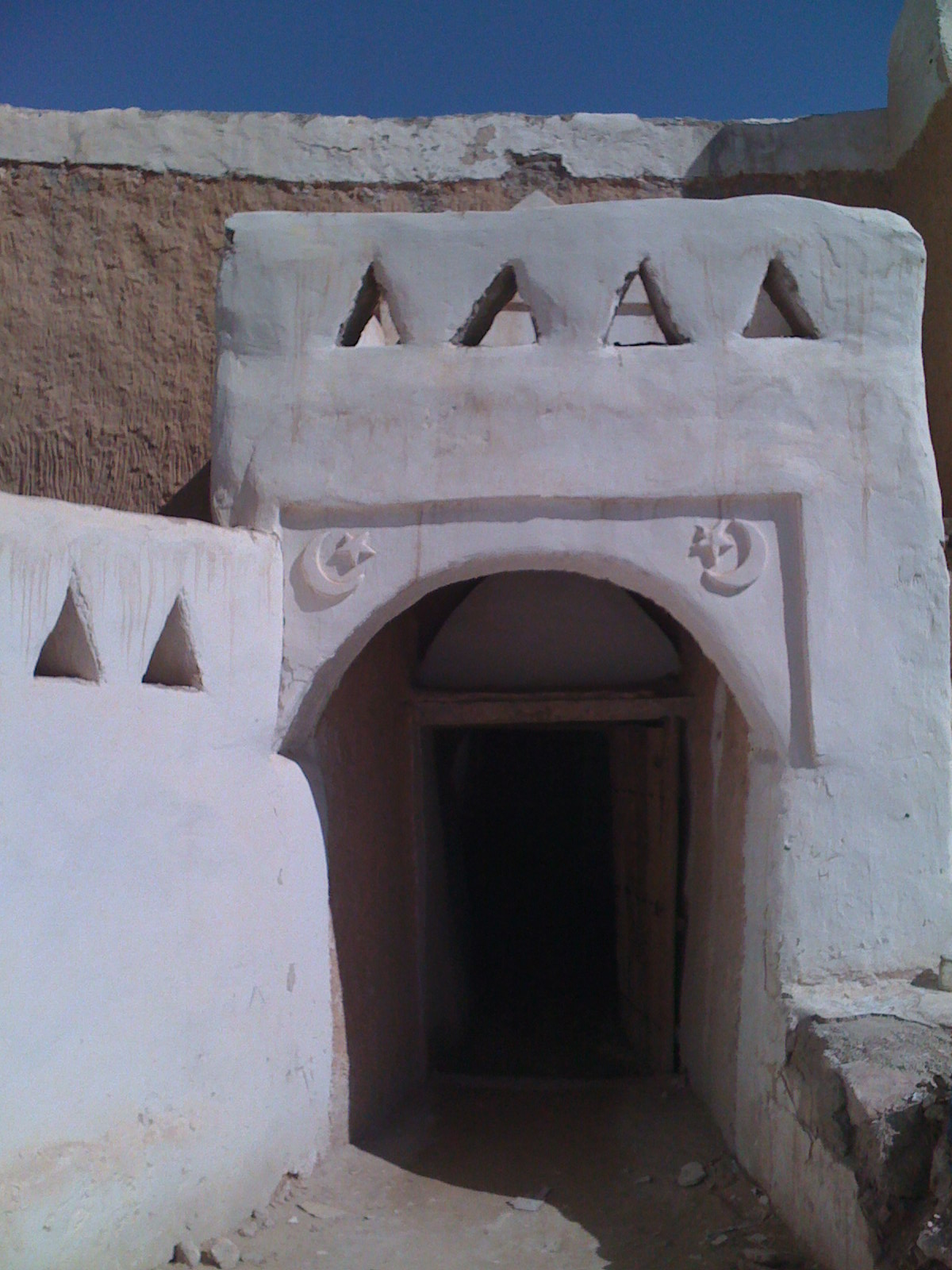
Old Town Wall Entrance

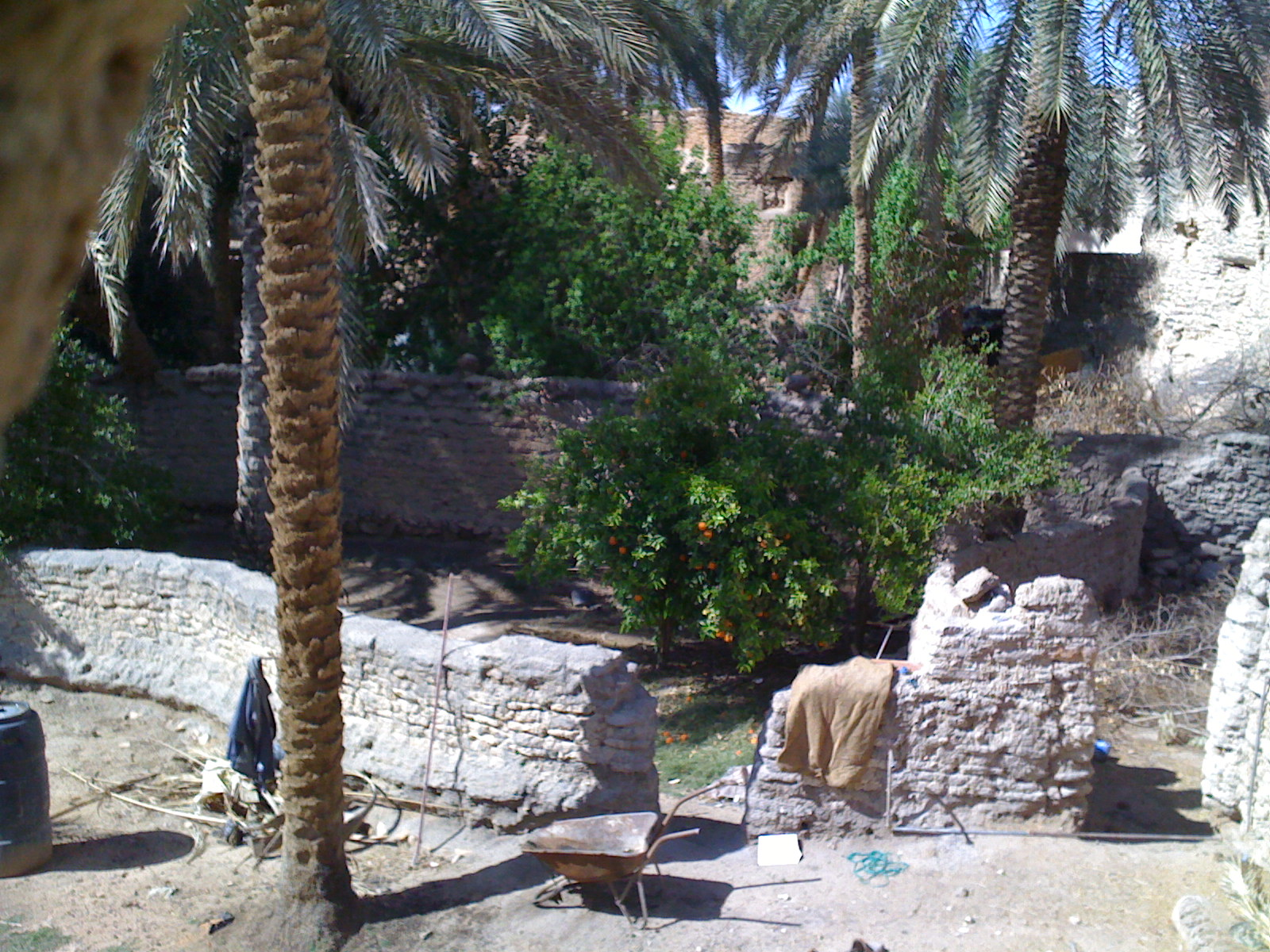
Fruit Trees in the Old Town

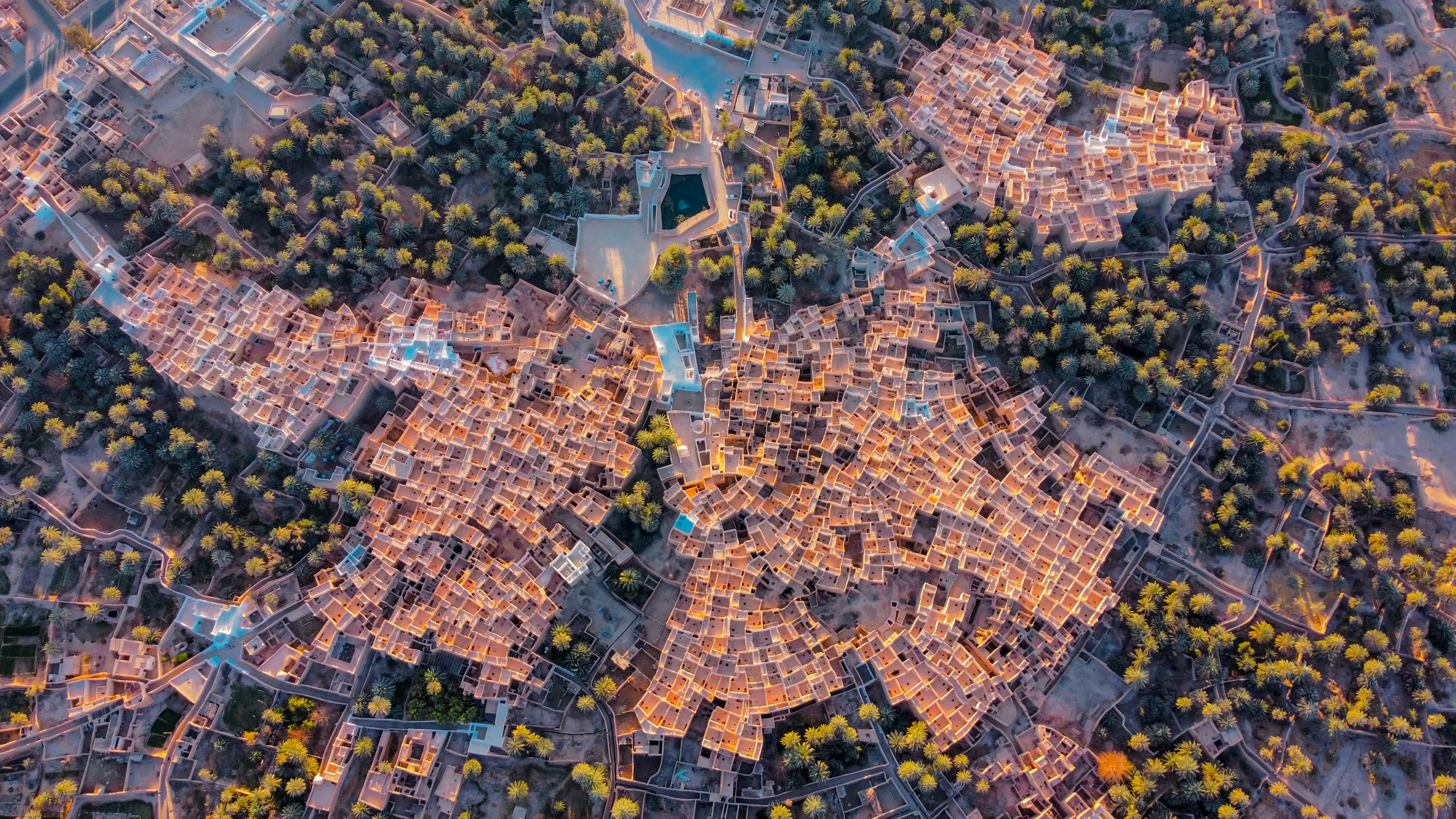
An aerial short of the old town.
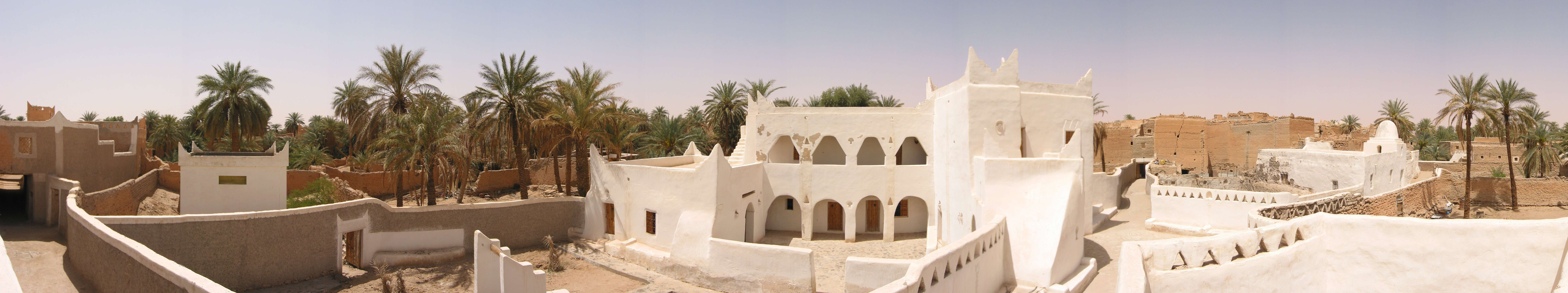
View over the rooftops of the old town of Ghadames

== See also ==
- Ghadames Museum
- Ghadames Airport
- List of cities in Libya
