= Libyan Studies Center =

1978 cultural center

The Libyan Studies Center (Markaz dirasat jihad al-libiyin didda al-ghazw al-itali) is a cultural center opened in 1978 in Tripoli, Libya. It holds 100,000 volumes.

The General Authority of Islamic Affairs and Endowments set claim to the land occupied by the building in 2007.

== See also ==
- National Archives of Libya

== Bibliography ==
- Dirk Vandewalle [in Dutch] (1994). "Research Facilities and Document Collections in the Socialist People's Libyan Arab Jamahiriyah". Middle East Studies Association Bulletin. 28 (1). USA: 9–13. doi:10.1017/S0026318400028431. JSTOR 23062295.
