= Ethnographic Museum of Tripoli =

Museum in Tripoli, Libya

- Location: Tripoli, Libya
- Type: Ethnography museum

The Ethnographic Museum of Tripoli is a museum located in Tripoli, Libya.

== See also ==
- List of museums in Libya
