= Prehistory Museum of Tripoli =

- Location: Tripoli, Libya
- Type: History museum

The Prehistory Museum of Tripoli is a museum located in Tripoli, Libya.

== See also ==
- List of museums in Libya
