= Natural History Museum of Tripoli =

- Location: Tripoli, Libya
- Type: Natural-history museum

The Natural History Museum of Tripoli is a museum located in Tripoli, Libya. It was developed by Professor Zahid Baig Mirza (Z. B. Mirza).

== See also ==
- List of museums in Libya
- List of natural-history museums
