= Karamanly House Museum =

- Also known as: Qaramanli House Museum; House of Karamanly; Tripoli Historical Exhibition
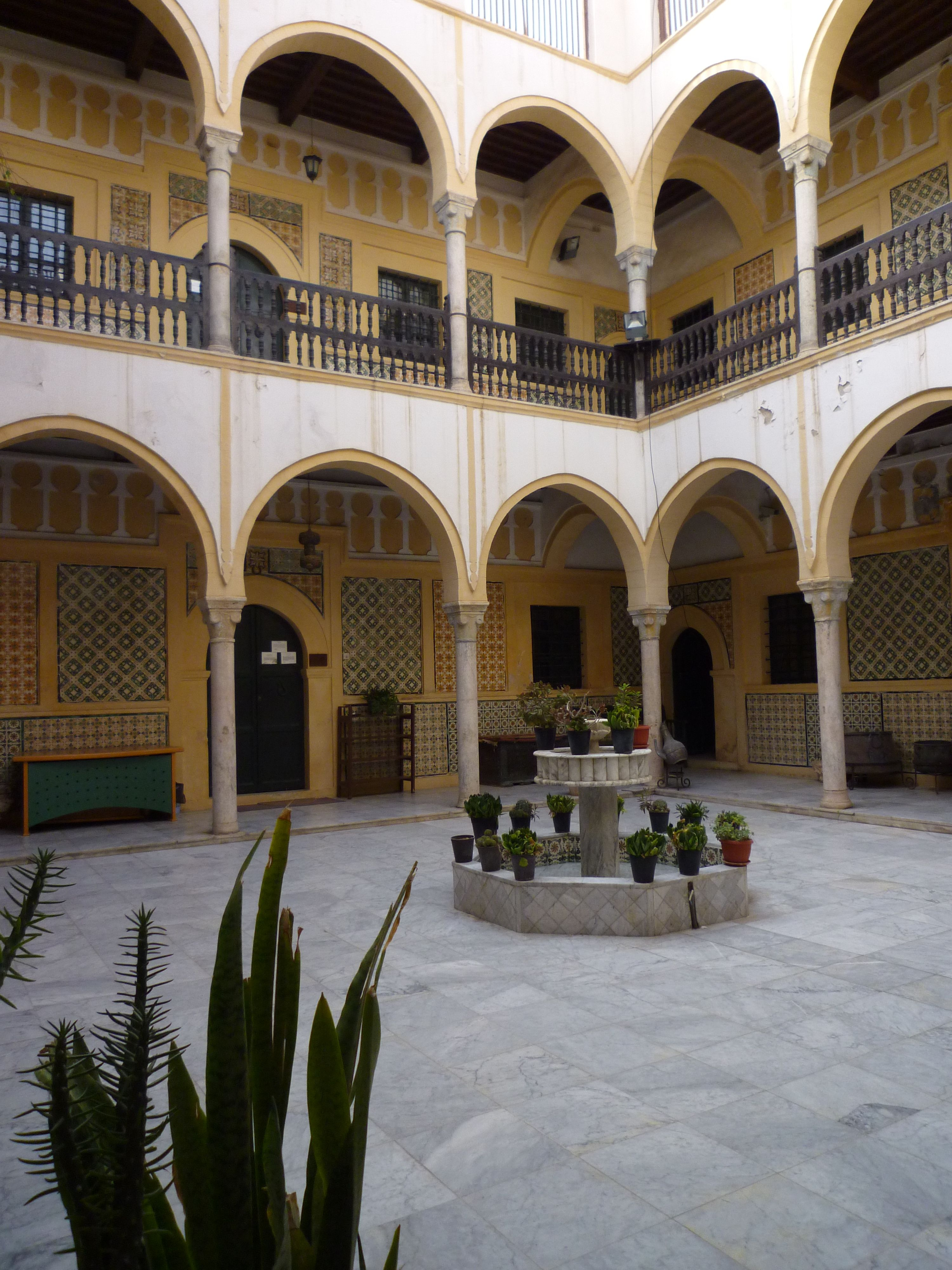
- Location: Tripoli, Libya
- Coordinates: 32.8972°N 13.1767°E
- Type: Historic house and museum

Karamanly House Museum
- Interactive map of the Karamanly House Museum area

General information
- Type: House
- Construction started: 18th century

The Karamanly House Museum (also known as the Qaramanli House Museum, the House of Karamanly and the Tripoli Historical Exhibition) is a historic house and museum located in the Old city in Tripoli, Libya. It is associated with the Karamanli dynasty.

The house was built in the second half of the 18th century . After restoration in the 1990s, it became a museum.

== Architecture ==
The Qaramanli house is one of the few traditional houses that have been preserved and rehabilitated in the Old city. It is characterized by its fine Islamic architectural design. It consists of two floors, with each of them having an area of 472 m^{2}.

The open air courtyard, a common element in Islamic residences, is centered around a beautiful fountain. One of the most notable aspects of the house must be the arches, which serve both a decorative as well as a load-bearing purpose. Mosaic patterns also adorn the walls of the house-museum.

The house comprises several rooms, including: a bedroom (Dar An-Namousiyyah), Dar Alqabou (containing the Qaramanli costumes and furniture), a sitting room (Dar Al Juloos), a clothing room (Dar Al-Albisah), a kitchen and many more.

== See also ==
- List of historic houses
- List of museums in Libya
