= National Archives of Libya =

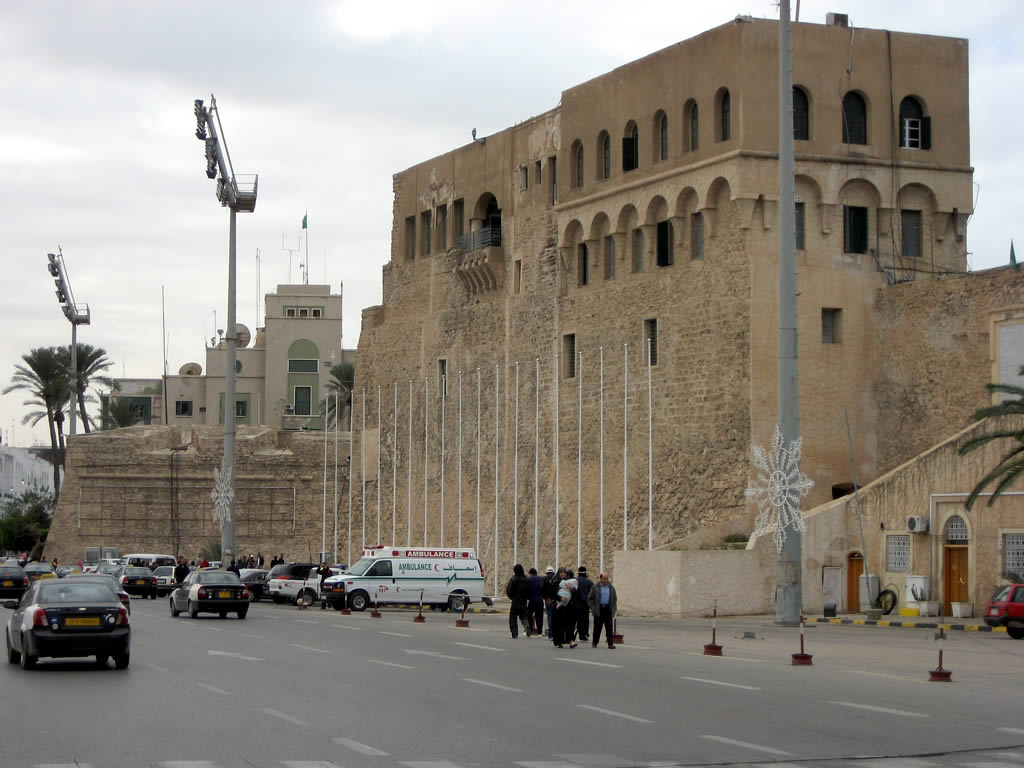
Red Castle, Tripoli, which houses the national archives (photo 2010)

The National Archives of Libya (Dar al-Mahfuzat al-Tarikhiyya) is the national archives of Libya, located in the Red Castle in Tripoli. As of 1980 it was overseen by Salaheddin Hasan al-Suri, Director of Antiquities.

== See also ==
- List of national archives
- Libyan Studies Center
- National Library of Libya
- Public Library of Libya
- Libyan Government Library
- Garyounis University Library

== Bibliography ==
- B. G. Martin (1962). "Five Letters from the Tripoli Archives". Journal of the Historical Society of Nigeria. 2 (3): 350–372. JSTOR 41856737. "Libyan Government Archives"
- B. G. Martin (1967). "Turkish Archival Sources for West African History". African Studies Bulletin. 10 (3): 59–65. doi:10.2307/523229. JSTOR 523229. "Libyan State Archive"
- Hassan Ibrahim Gwarzo (1968). "Seven Letters from the Tripoli Archives". Kano Studies. 1 (4). ISSN 0567-4840.
- Lisa S. Anderson (1980). "Research Facilities in the Socialist People's Libyan Arab Jamahiriyah". Middle East Studies Association Bulletin. 14 (1). USA: 27–31. doi:10.1017/S0026318400007987. JSTOR 23057756. S2CID 158037473. "National Archives"
- Dirk Vandewalle [in Dutch] (1994). "Research Facilities and Document Collections in the Socialist People's Libyan Arab Jamahiriyah". Middle East Studies Association Bulletin. 28 (1). USA: 9–13. doi:10.1017/S0026318400028431. JSTOR 23062295. S2CID 157127846. "Dar al-mahfuzat al-tarikhiyah (Libyan Historical Archives)"
