= Red Castle Museum =

Coordinates: 32°53′45″N 13°10′49″E

Red Castle Museum also known as: • Assaraya Alhamra Museum (Arabic: متحف السرايا الحمراء) • Archaeological Museum of Tripoli
- Established: 1919
- Location: Tripoli, Libya
- Type: National museum

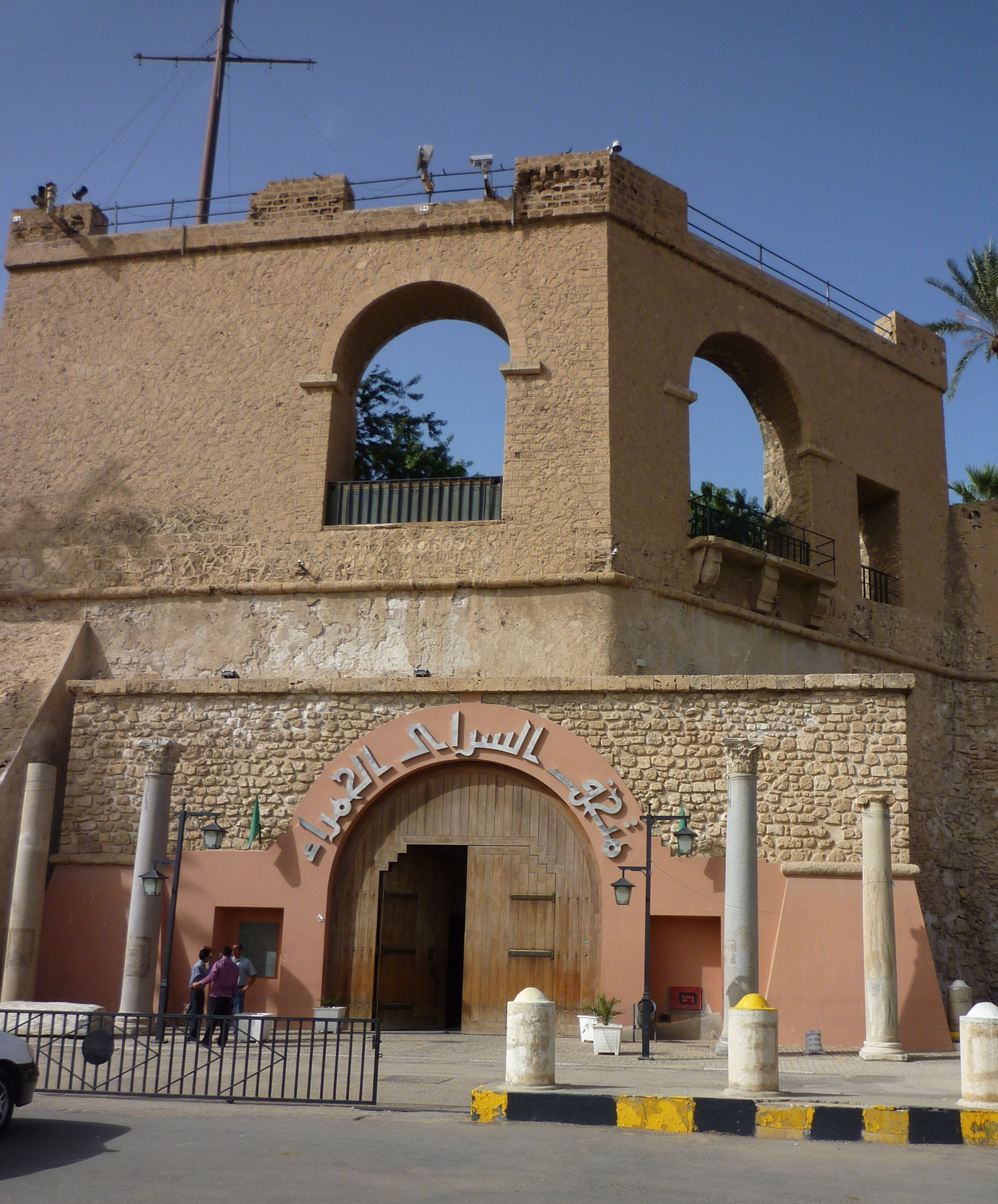
The Red Castle and entrance to the national Red Castle Museum

The Red Castle Museum, also known as As-saraya Al-hamra Museum (Arabic: متحف السرايا الحمراء, romanized: Matḥaf al-Sarāyā al-Ḥamrāʼ), the Archaeological Museum of Tripoli or Jamahiriya Museum, is a national museum in Libya. It is located in the historic building known as the Red Castle of Tripoli (Arabic: السراي الحمراء, romanized: al-Sarāy al-Ḥamrāʼ), sometimes also referred to as Red Saraya, on the promontory above and adjacent to the old-town district with medina Ghadema.

Designed in conjunction with UNESCO, the museum covers 5,000 years from prehistory to the independence revolution (1953) era. The museum has an entrance on historic As-Saha al-Kradrah, the Martyrs' Square. The museum was closed from 2011 to 2025 for security concerns.

== History ==
The museum was established in 1919, when the colonial Italians in Libya converted a section of the castle to a museum to house many of the archaeological artifacts scattered across the country since prehistoric times. The building was renovated in the early 1920s on plans by Armando Brasini, who designed its characteristic arches. The square around the castle was designed in the thirties by architect Florestano Di Fausto. When the British occupied Libya during World War II, the museum occupied the entire complex of the castle and in 1948 was renamed The Libyan Museum. The museum reopened to the public in 1988, renamed the Assaraya Alhamra Museum–Red Castle Museum, with "state-of-the-art" facilities.

In 2011 the museum was closed due to security concerns following the Libyan Civil War and subsequent unrest. The museum remained closed as of 2020. During the 2011 war, rebels entered the museum and a few items belonging to Muammar Gaddafi were damaged. The most valuable items were kept safe at another location by the museum staff. The remaining items relating to Gaddafi were placed in storage by the staff.The museum officially reopened 12 December 2025 renamed to The National Museum of Libya. Initially access is limited to groups from schools.

== Collections ==
The museum was designed with different wings and floors for the exhibition of the distinct collections.

- Prehistory of the Libyan region
- Ancient Libyan tribes and traditions – the Maghreb Berbers: Garamentes, Tuareg, and others
- Libyan culture during the Phoenician–Punic–Greek–Roman Libya–Byzantine–Ottoman Tripolitania-era traditions
- Islamic architecture
- Italian Libya, World War II, Libyan independence and 20th-century Libyan heritage
- Natural history of the Libyan region

== Gallery ==
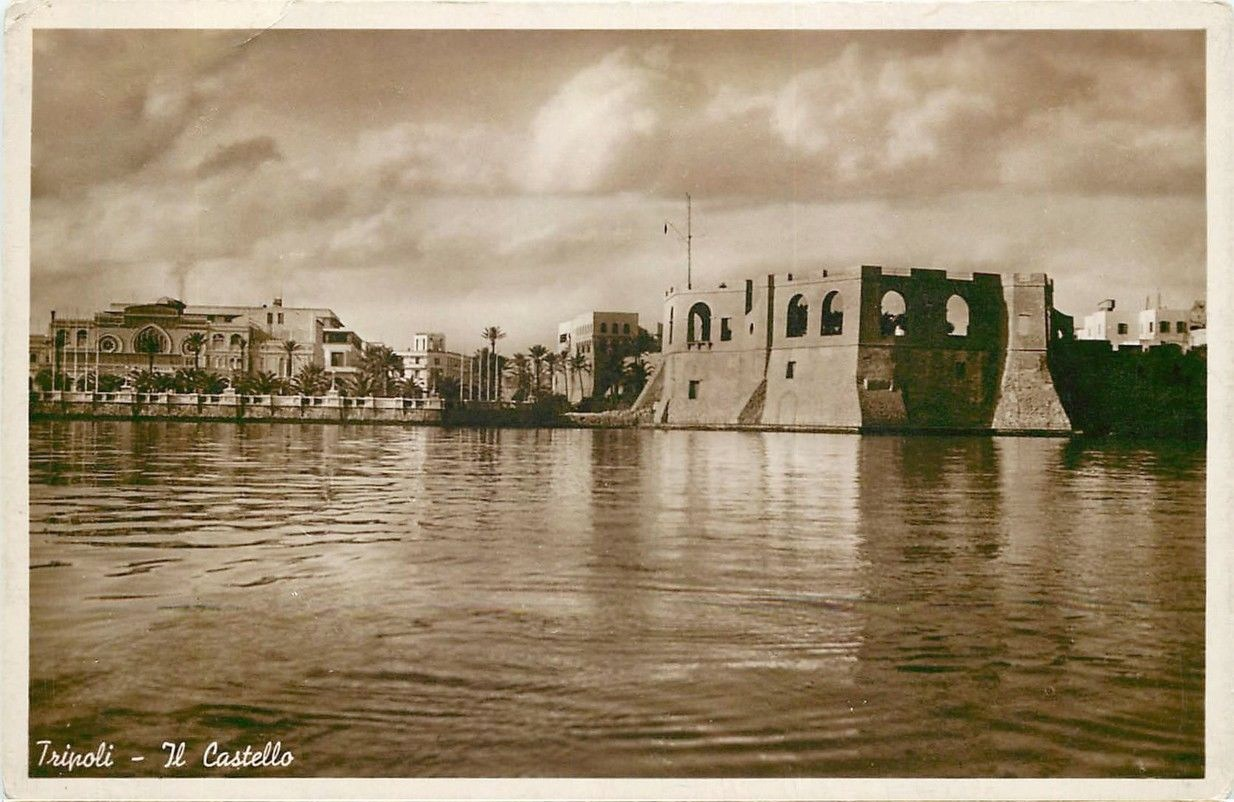
The Red Castle on the bay before harbor landfill, circa 1940s, with Miramare Theater (left) and Italy Square (Martyrs' Square) (center-palms).

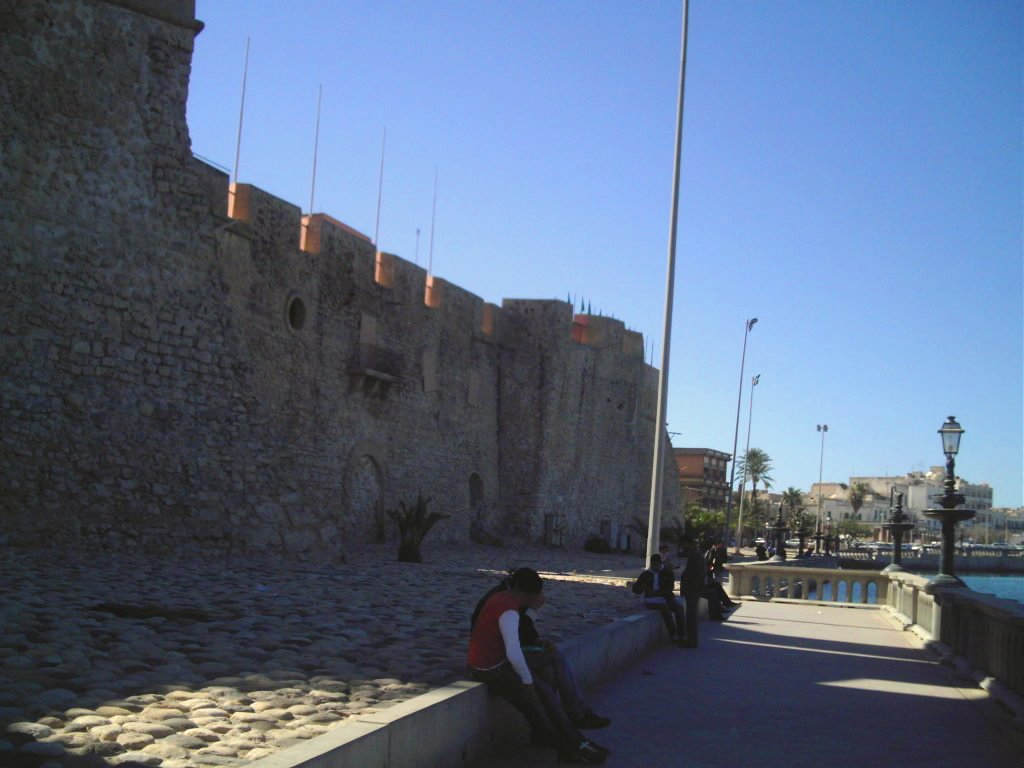
The Red Castle, a view of the northeastern side with the Martyrs' Square museum entrance.

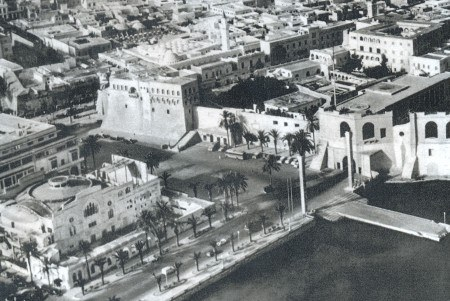
Aerial view, circa 1950s, of the Red Castle, with Independence Square (Martyrs' Square), the Royal Miramare Theater (lower left), and old shoreline.

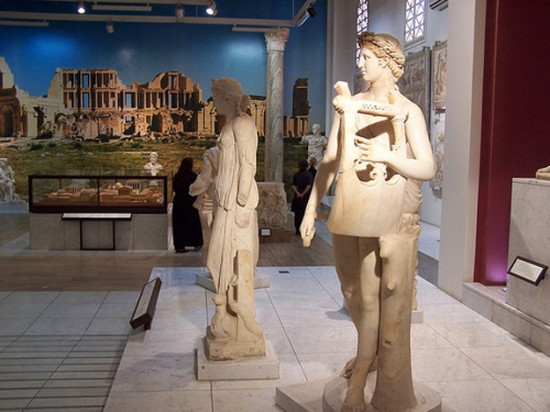
Inside the museum

=== National Museum reopened in Tripoli ===
After more than a decade of closure due to conflicts, The National Museum of Libya has been reopened in Tripoli for public view.

== See also ==
- Zliten mosaic
- History of Islamic Tripolitania and Cyrenaica
- History of Libya
- List of museums in Libya
