= Darghouth Turkish Bath =

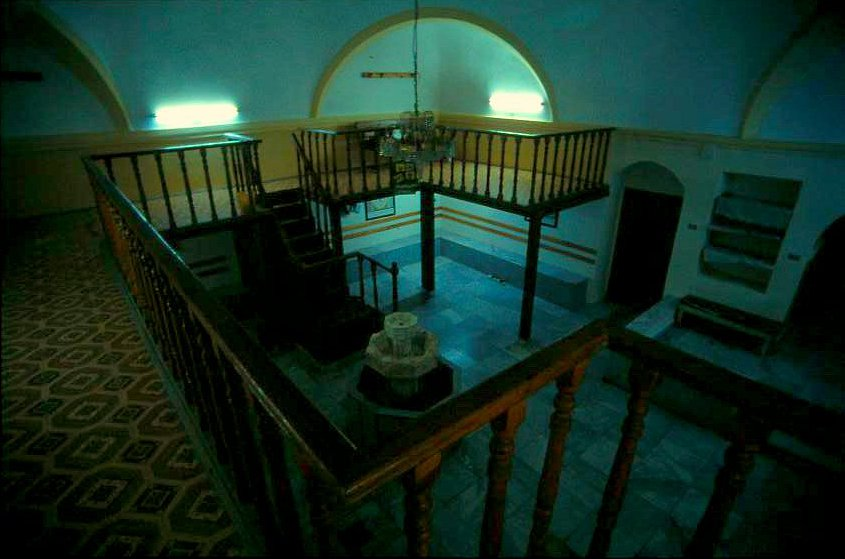
Darghouth Turkish bath form the inside

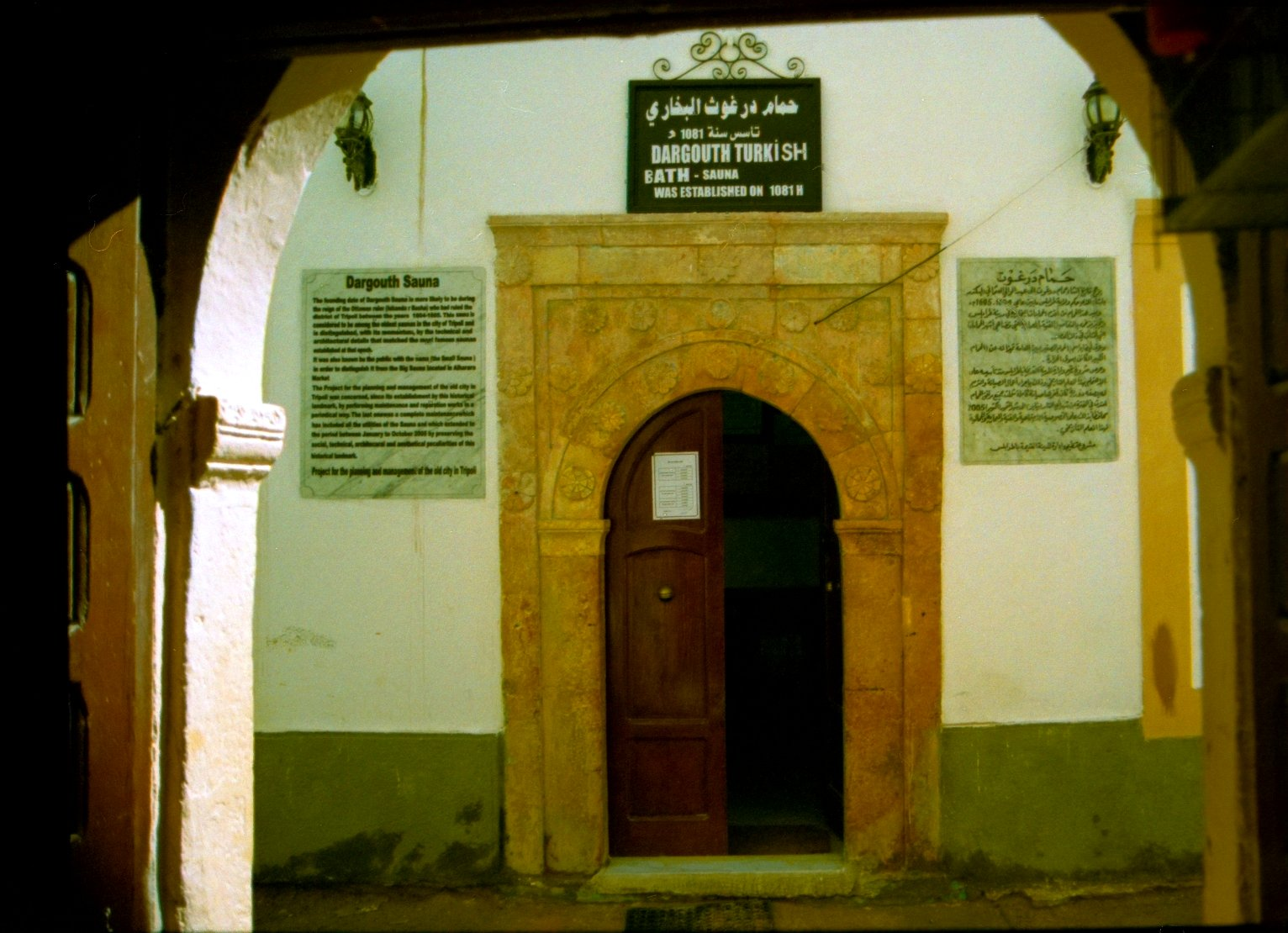
Darghouth Turkish bath-entrance

Dargouth Turkish Bath is a Hammam in the old quarter of Tripoli, Libya. The bath was established in 1081 AH/(1670 AD or 1671 AD). It is annexed to Sidi Darghut Mosque and tomb, whence it derives its name. The mosque and tomb in turn derive their names from the name of the Ottoman naval commander Turgut.
