= Capitoline Temple =

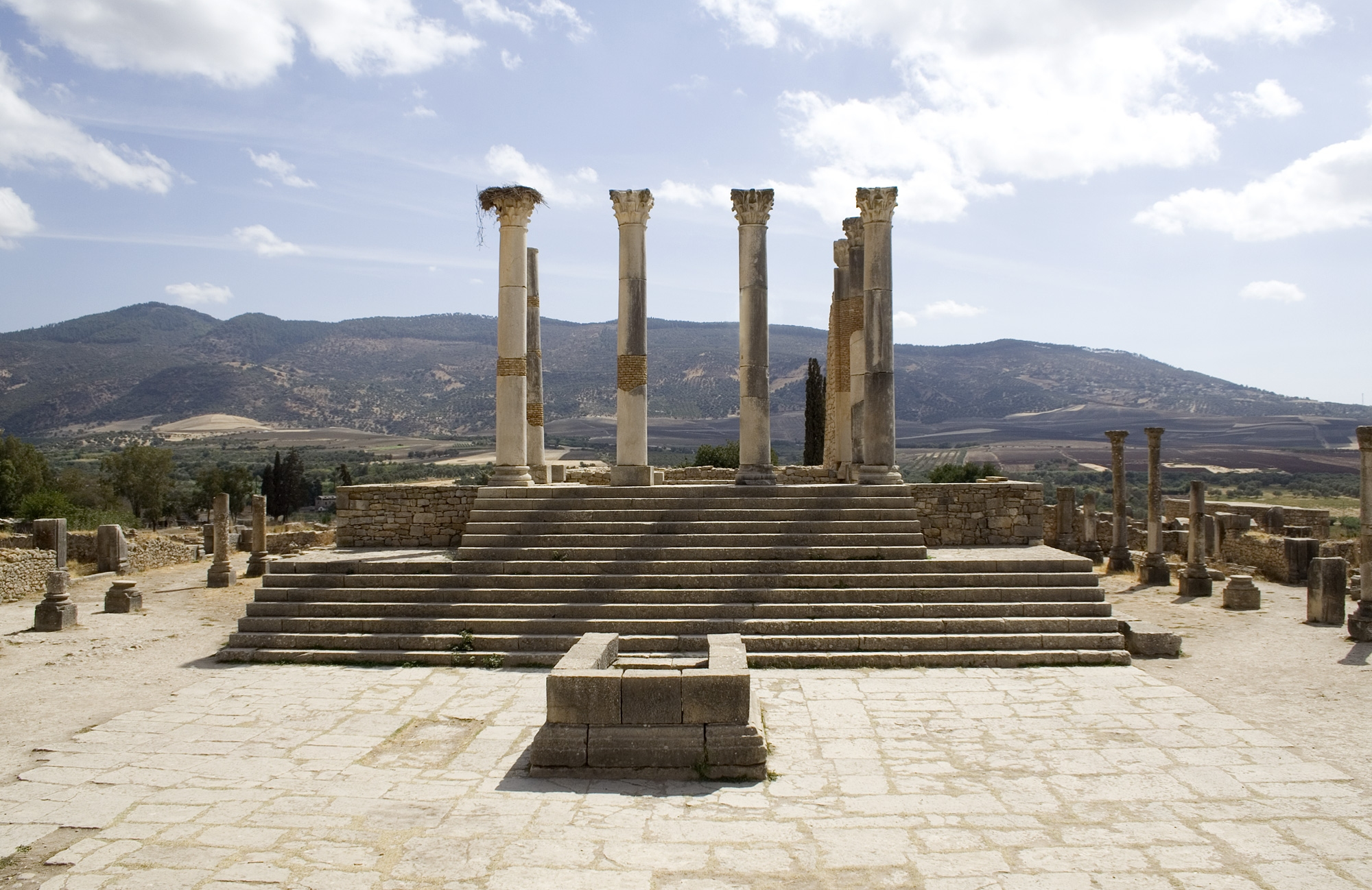
- Capitoline Temple of Volubilis

- Location within Morocco

General information
- Type: temple
- Architectural style: Roman (Tetrastyle)
- Location: Volubilis, Kingdom of Mauretania, Morocco
- Coordinates: 34°04′21″N 5°33′16″W
- Inaugurated: Roman era

The Capitoline Temple is an ancient monument located in the ancient city of Volubilis in Fès-Meknès, Morocco. It dates from the Roman era, and was situated in the province of Mauretania Tingitana.

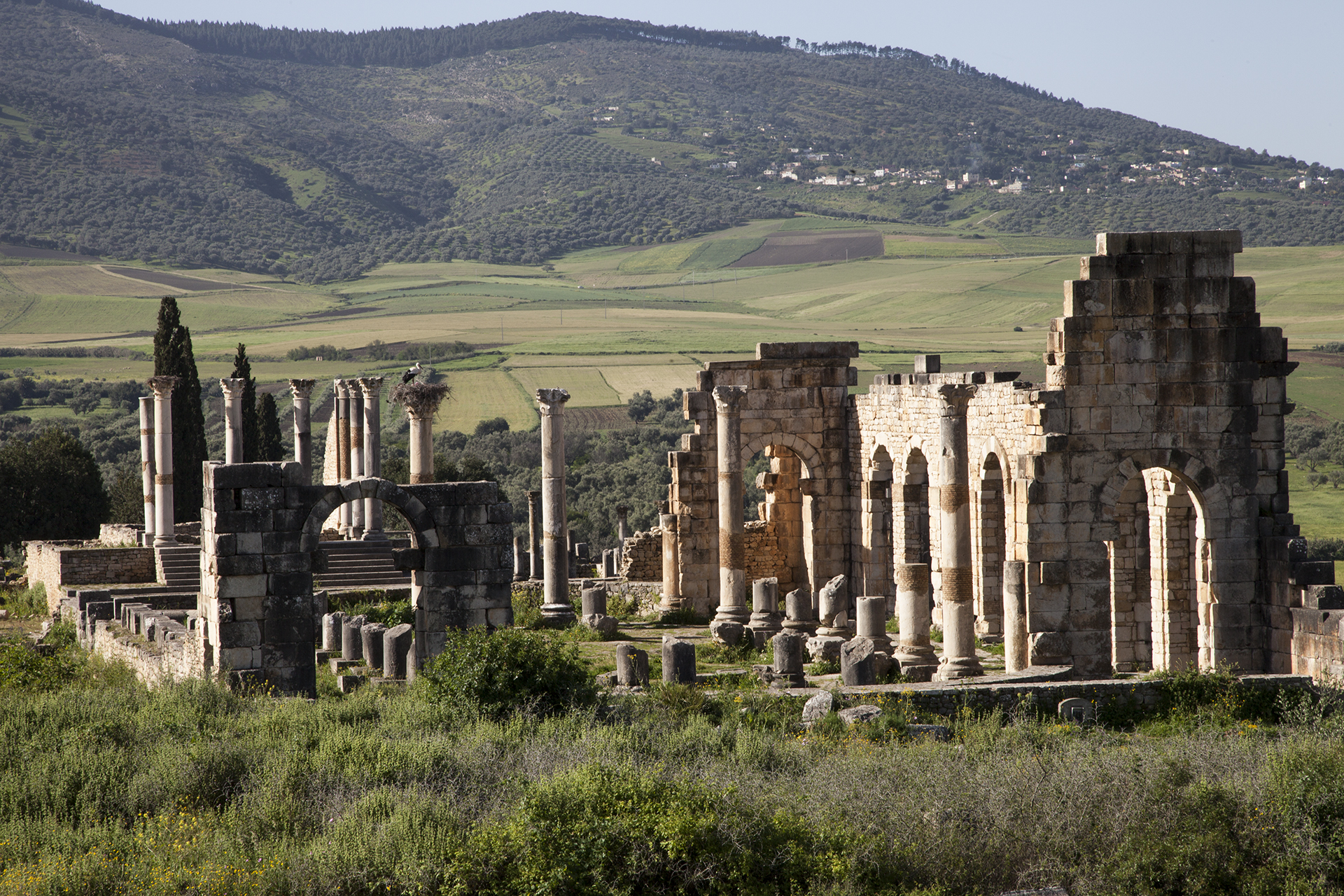
Stone ruins of the Capitoline Temple at Volubilis

The building incorporates a tetrastyle architectural design, and was dedicated to the Roman Emperor Macrinus. The temple is earmarked for the trinity of Roman gods, Juno, Jupiter and Minerva. According to Rogerson, a council would meet below the Capitoline Temple in order to make a declaration of war, and then later return to this location with the booty of the resultant war.

The Romans also constructed temples of the same name in the city of Rome itself and other locations within the Roman Empire.

== See also ==
- Arch of Trajan (Timgad)
- Libyco-Punic Mausoleum of Dougga
- Madghacen
- Roman architecture
