= Grand Hotel Tripoli =

Hotel in Libya

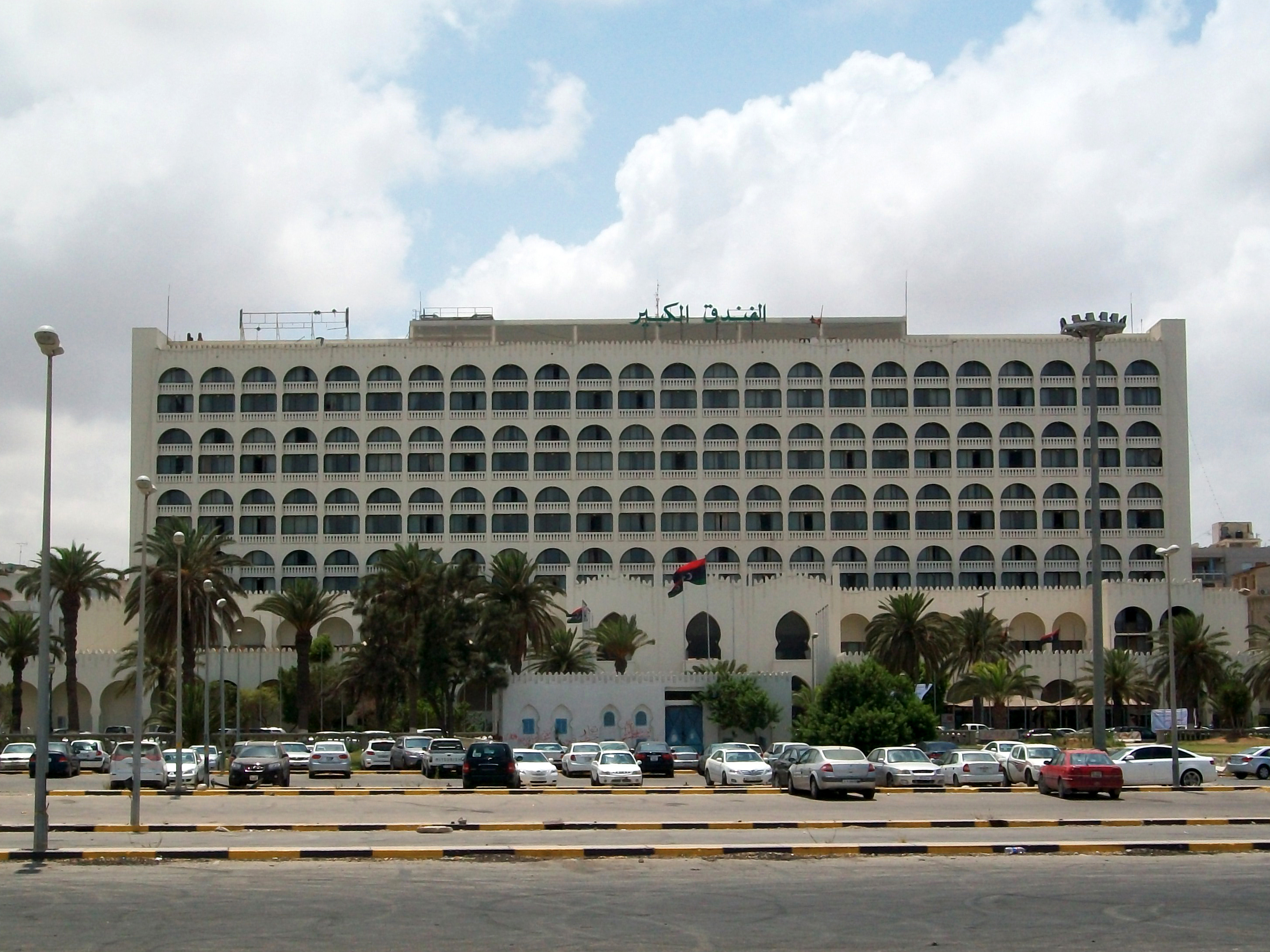

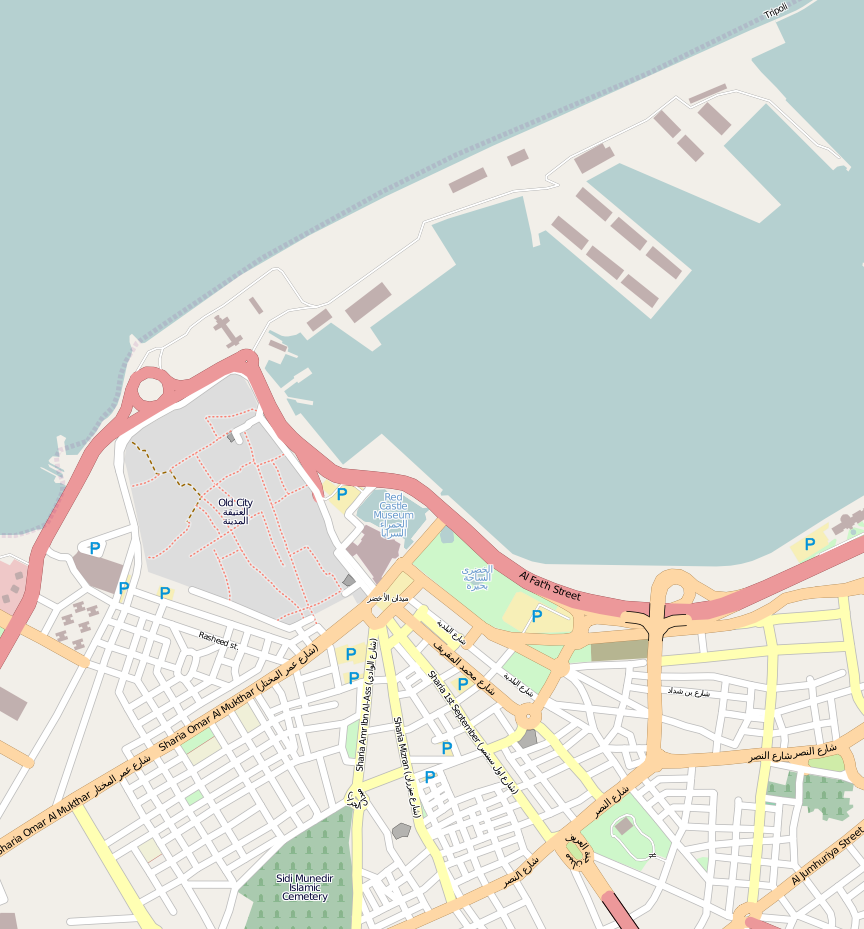
- Location within Tripoli, Libya

General information
- Location: Elfatah Street, Tripoli, Libya
- Coordinates: 32°53′35″N 13°11′4″E
- Opening: 1982

Other information
- Number of rooms: 350

The Grand Hotel Tripoli, known as Funduq Al-Kabir in Arabic, is a defunct hotel on El-Fatah Street in Tripoli, Libya.

== History ==
The first Grand Hotel Tripoli was built by the Italians in 1927 in the "Neomoresco style".

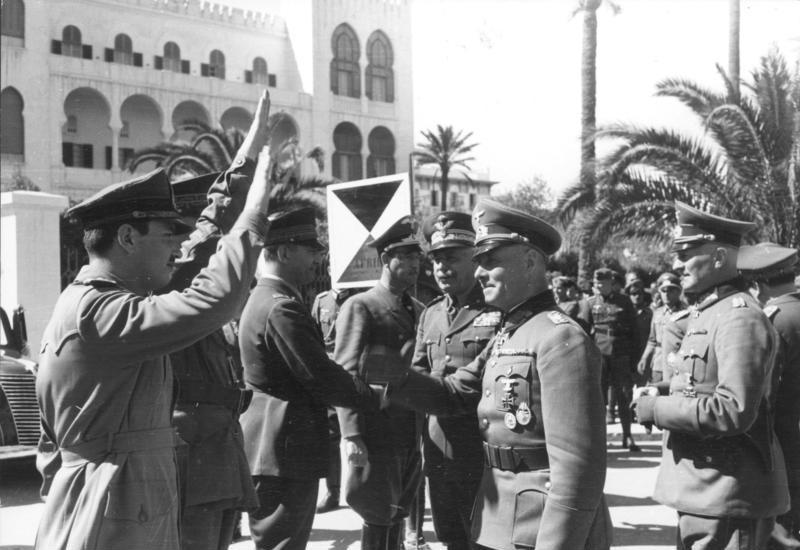
General Italo Gariboldi welcoming Generals Erwin Rommel and Johannes Streich to Tripoli 12 February 1941 in front of the Grand Hotel of Tripoli

The hotel appears within a photo taken with Italian General Italo Gariboldi welcoming Erwin Rommel and Johannes Streich on February 12, 1941. Rommel was selected by Hitler to lead the newly formed Afrika Korps divisions in the fight against British forces in North Africa. Two days later, his troops arrived in Tripoli. Several days later, his troops staged a parade in the Suq-al-Khubsa plaza (now known as Martyrs' Square) where he multiplied the number of his forces by ordering his tanks and infantry to circle the square multiple times, to boost morale and falsify numbers to any British spies. Erwin Rommel with his Afrika Korps and with the Italian Army then expelled the British 8th Army out of Libya, and eventually led his forces into Egypt during the North Africa campaign that lasted for 3 years earning him the famed title "the Desert Fox".

The hotel was heavily damaged by bombings in 1942, but remained in operation until its demolition in the early 1980s.

The current Grand Hotel Tripoli was built in 1982 and designed by the British firm of Wakeman Trower & Partners Ltd. The hotel closed in 2011, due to the Libyan Civil War.

In December 2025, plans were announced for the hotel's renovation and reopening.

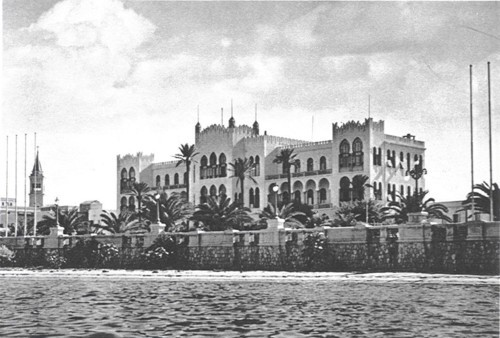
The original Grand Hotel Tripoli

The Original hotel stands in an extensive open park which overlooks the then unfilled Tripoli harbor, not far from the Algerian embassy and Tripoli Cathedral - Jamal Abdul Nasser Mosque. It has 350 rooms. It is noted for its many arches, inspired by the original building's facade, which form the basis of the structure. The hotel once had a propaganda poster on the outside of the hotel that showed a crying child superimposed above a montage of the wreckage caused by the attack by the British.
