= Libyan Civil War (disambiguation) =

Libyan Civil War may refer to:

- Tripolitanian civil war, a conflict from 1793 to 1795 in what is today Libya
- 1920 Jabal al-Gharbi civil war, a conflict in the Nafusa Mountains in what is today Libya
- First Libyan Civil War, armed conflict in 2011 between forces loyal to Colonel Muammar Gaddafi and foreign supported groups seeking to oust his government
- Second Libyan Civil War, multi-sided civil war in Libya from 2014 to 2020

== See also ==
- Libyan Crisis (2011–present), humanitarian crisis and political-military instability since 2011, including the Arab Spring and First Libyan Civil War
- Factional violence in Libya (2011–2014), a period of violence in Libya following the First Libyan Civil War and preceding the Second Libyan Civil War
- Libyan War (disambiguation)
