= Libyan War =

Libyan War may refer to:

- Mercenary War (241–238 BCE)
- Tripolitanian civil war (1793–1795)
- Italo-Turkish War (1911–1912)
- Libyan civil war (2011)
  - 2011 military intervention in Libya
- Libyan civil war (2014–2020)

== See also ==
- List of wars involving Libya
- Libyan Civil War (disambiguation)
