= Red Castle of Tripoli =

Landmark in Libya

Coordinates: 32.8961°N 13.1804°E

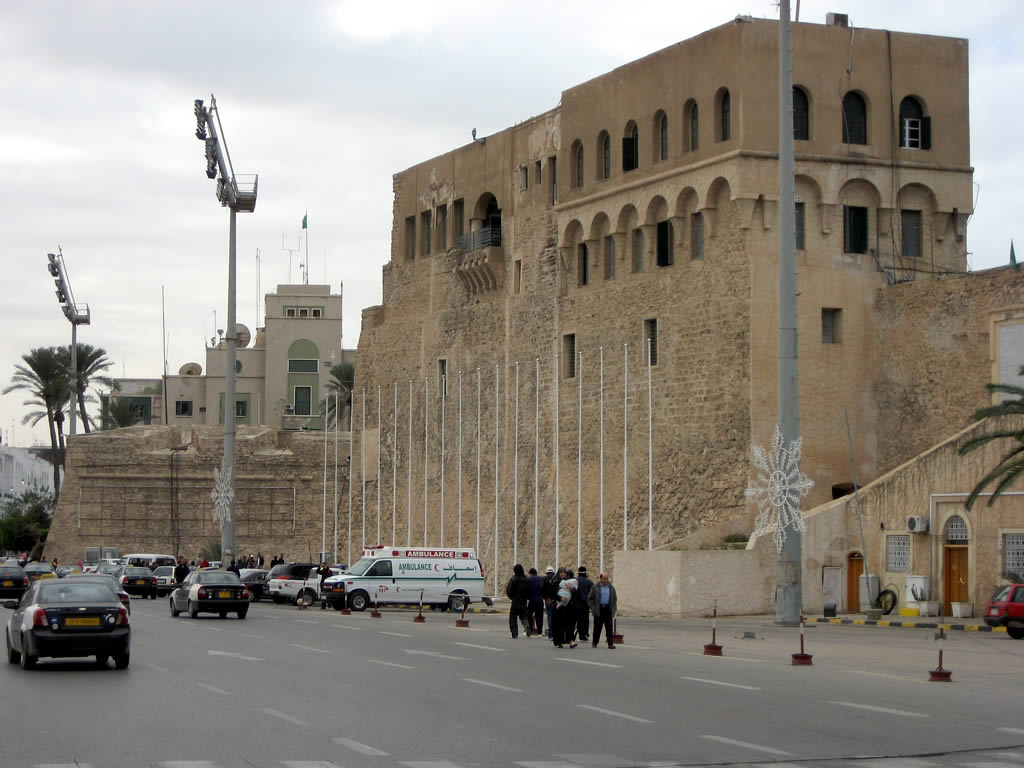
The Red Castle's Saint George Bastion, facing Martyrs' Square

The Red Castle, in Arabic As-saraya Al-hamra (السرايا الحمراء), sometimes also Red Fort or Red Saraya, is a major landmark on the waterfront of Tripoli, bordering Martyrs' Square. It has been the home of the Red Castle Museum (under various names) since 1919, and of the Libyan Department of Archaeology since 1952.

== Description ==
Map of Tripoli in 1904, showing the Red Castle ("Pasha's Castle") on the eastern edge of town

The Red Castle used to be located directly on the sea. In the 1970s, the building of the seafront highway (Al-Shat Road) resulted in the creation of the Saraya Lake, as the castle was cut off from the sea. The building is bordered by the Saraya Lake to the northeast, the Central Bank of Libya to the northwest, the Souq al-Mushir neighborhood around the Karamanli Mosque to the southwest, and Martyrs' Square to the southeast.

The castle forms an imperfect square with sides of unequal length: 115 meters (north-east), 90 meters (north-west), 130 meters (south-west), and 140 meters (south-east). Its area is about 13,000 square meters. There are several buildings and courtyards inside the castle's walls.

== History ==
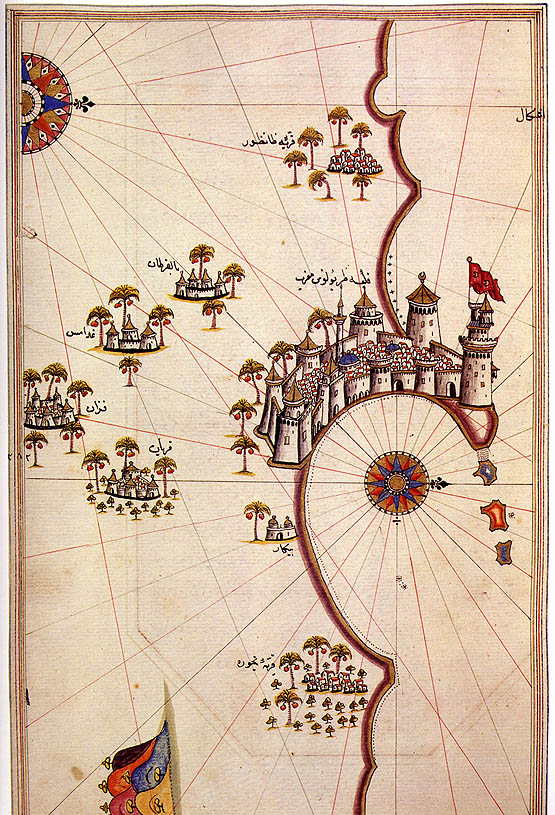
Early 16th-century map of Tripoli by Piri Reis, indicating the Red Castle on the left

The origins of the castle may be as old as the Phoenician foundation of Oea in the 7th century BCE; excavations have found remains dating back to Roman times. Like the surrounded region, it was taken over by the Vandal Kingdom around 439, recovered by the Roman Empire in 534, overrun by Amr ibn al-As in 642 or 643, reconquered by the Byzantines then again by the Umayyad Caliphate in the late 7th century; then under the rule of the Abbasid Caliphates (750–800), the Aghlabid Emirate of Ifriqiya (800–909), the Fatimid Caliphate (10th century) who refurbished it into a royal residence, the Zirid Emirate of Ifriqiya and Banu Khazrun (11th century-1146), the Norman Kingdom of Africa (1146-58), the Almohad Caliphate (1158-1229), the Hafsid Emirate of Ifriqiya (1234–1321), the Beni Ammar (1321–1401) and again the Hafsid Emirate (1401–1510, with another lapse in the mid-15th century).

In 1510 Tripoli was conquered by the Crown of Aragon. Much of the current structures appear to date from the subsequent period of rule by Aragonese military commanders and, after 1530, by the Knights Hospitaller until their expulsion by the Ottoman Empire following the Siege of Tripoli (1551). The castle is also said to have been painted red ochre during that time, thus its current name. The first Ottoman governor or Pasha of Tripoli, Murād Agha, converted the castle's Church of Saint Leonard into a mosque, and subsequent governors made the building into their residence. As such, the castle was the center of power under Ahmed Karamanli, of Janissary origin, and the Karamanli dynasty (1711–1835).

After the Italian conquest of Libya in 1911, the castle was initially used as residence for the Italian governor-general. In 1919 it was converted into a museum, the first in Libya's history. In 1922-23 it was correspondingly refurbished along designs by architect Armando Brasini, who took a creative approach to its renovation. Brasini modified the Saint George Bastion to a more medieval appearance, created a new (albeit ancient-looking) entrance portal, and built the castle's iconic arches above the eastern (Saint James) bastion, originally facing the sea and now on the Saraya Lake. Brasini's initial plan was to have even more arches built, including a second level above the ones that were constructed.

In the 1930s, governor Italo Balbo established his office inside the building. On 5 November 1938, Balbo inaugurated an equestrian statue of Benito Mussolini in front of the castle. The castle was protected under the British Military Administration from 1942, and the British authorities reopened an expanded museum in 1948. The museum was again refurbished under Muammar Gaddafi between 1982 and 1988. The building and museum only suffered minor damage during the First Libyan Civil War in 2011. The museum was closed in 2015 but had reopened by 2021.

== Gallery ==
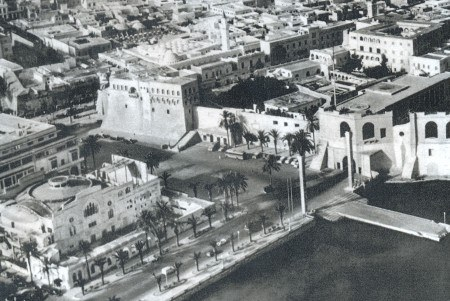
Aerial view in the 1950s

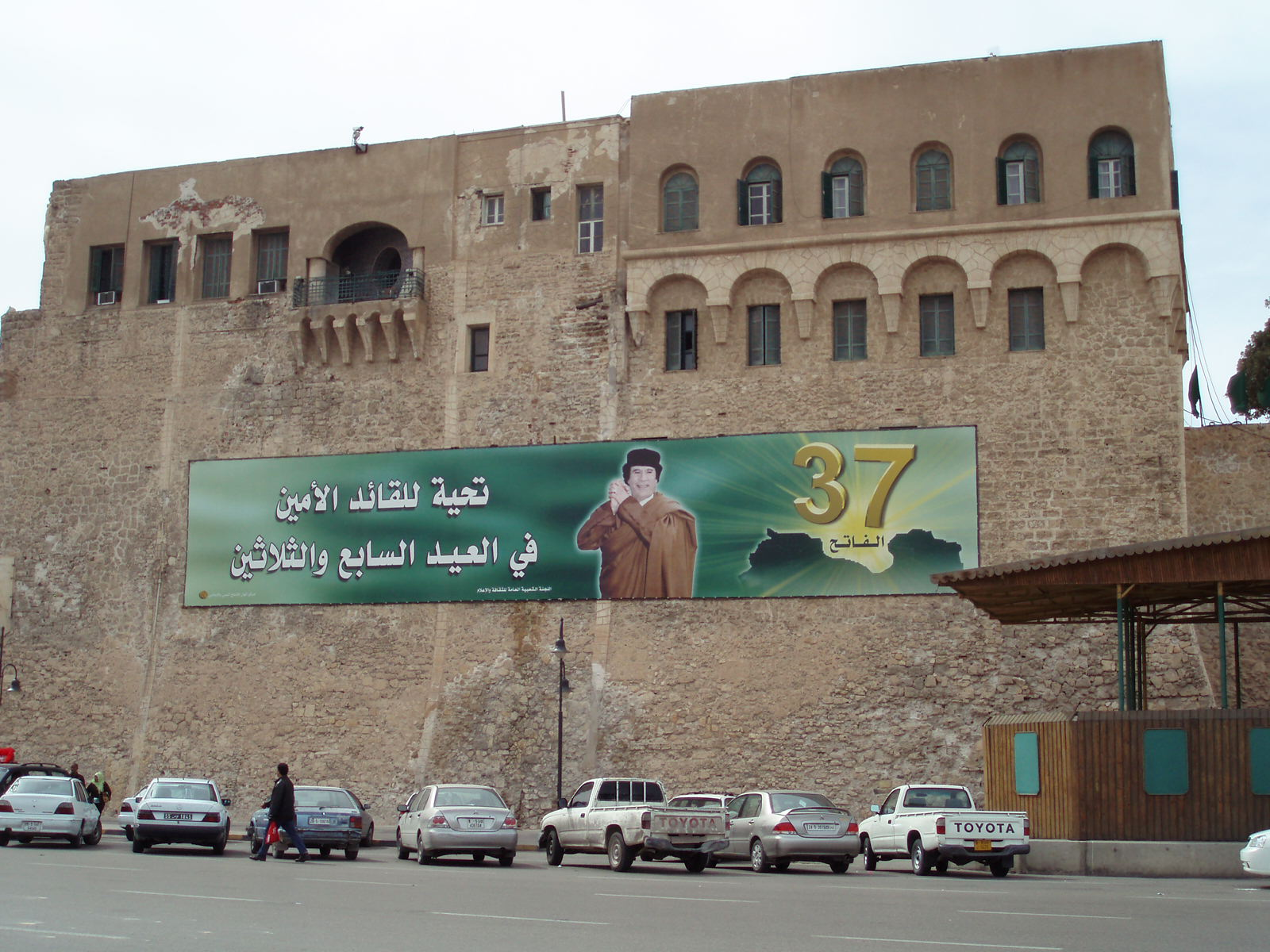
Main façade (Saint George Bastion) with banner celebrating Muammar Gaddafi, 1 April 2007

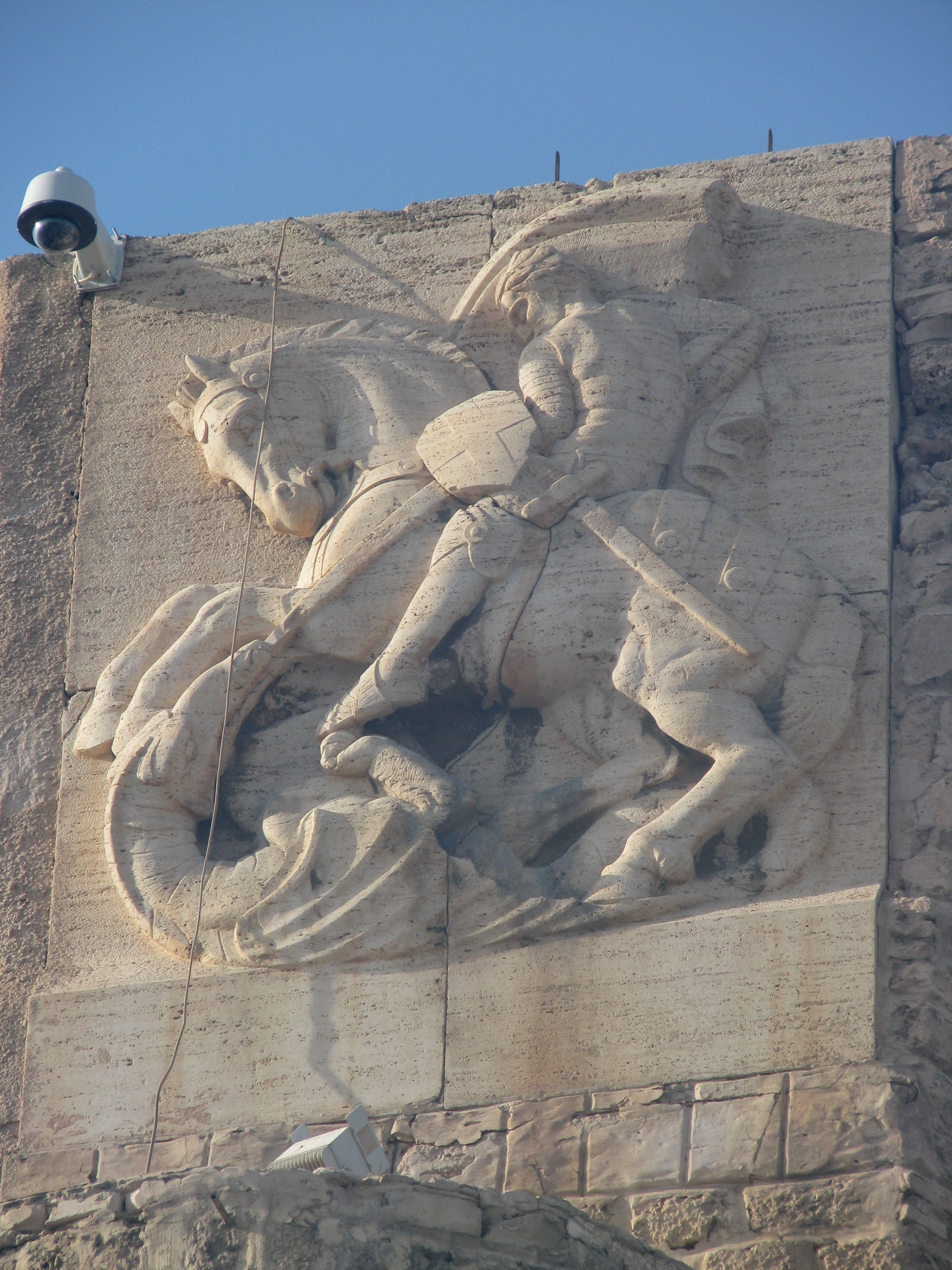
Sculpture of Saint George on the Saint George Bastion, from the 1920s renovation

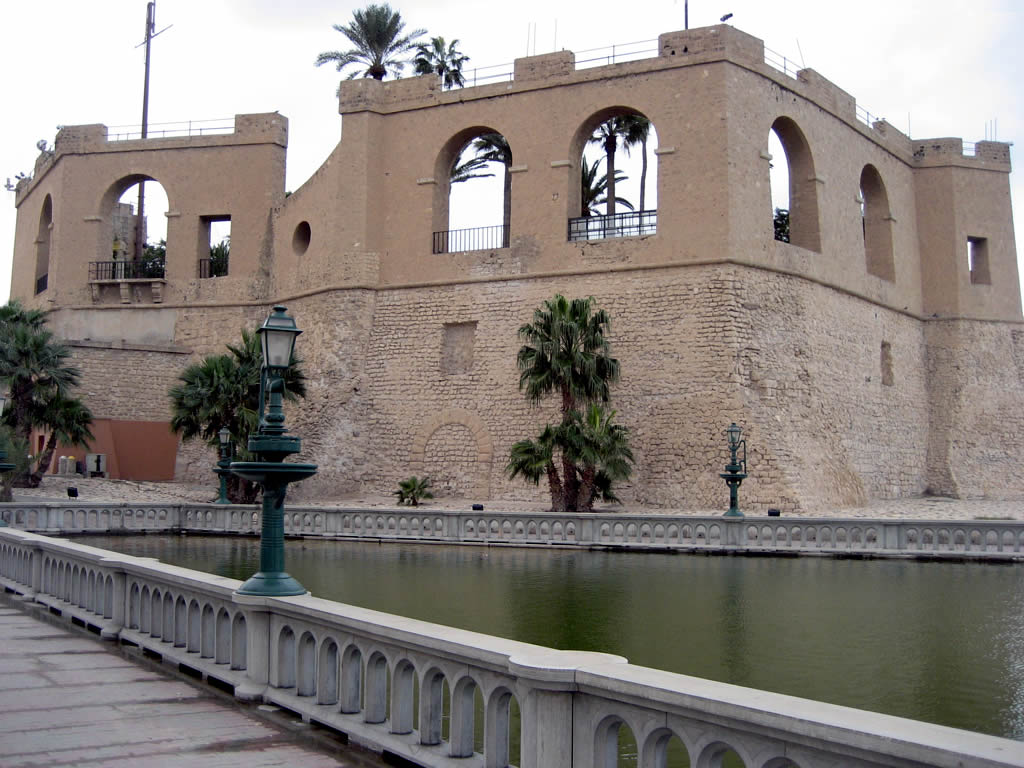
Arches created by Armando Brasini on the Saint James Bastion

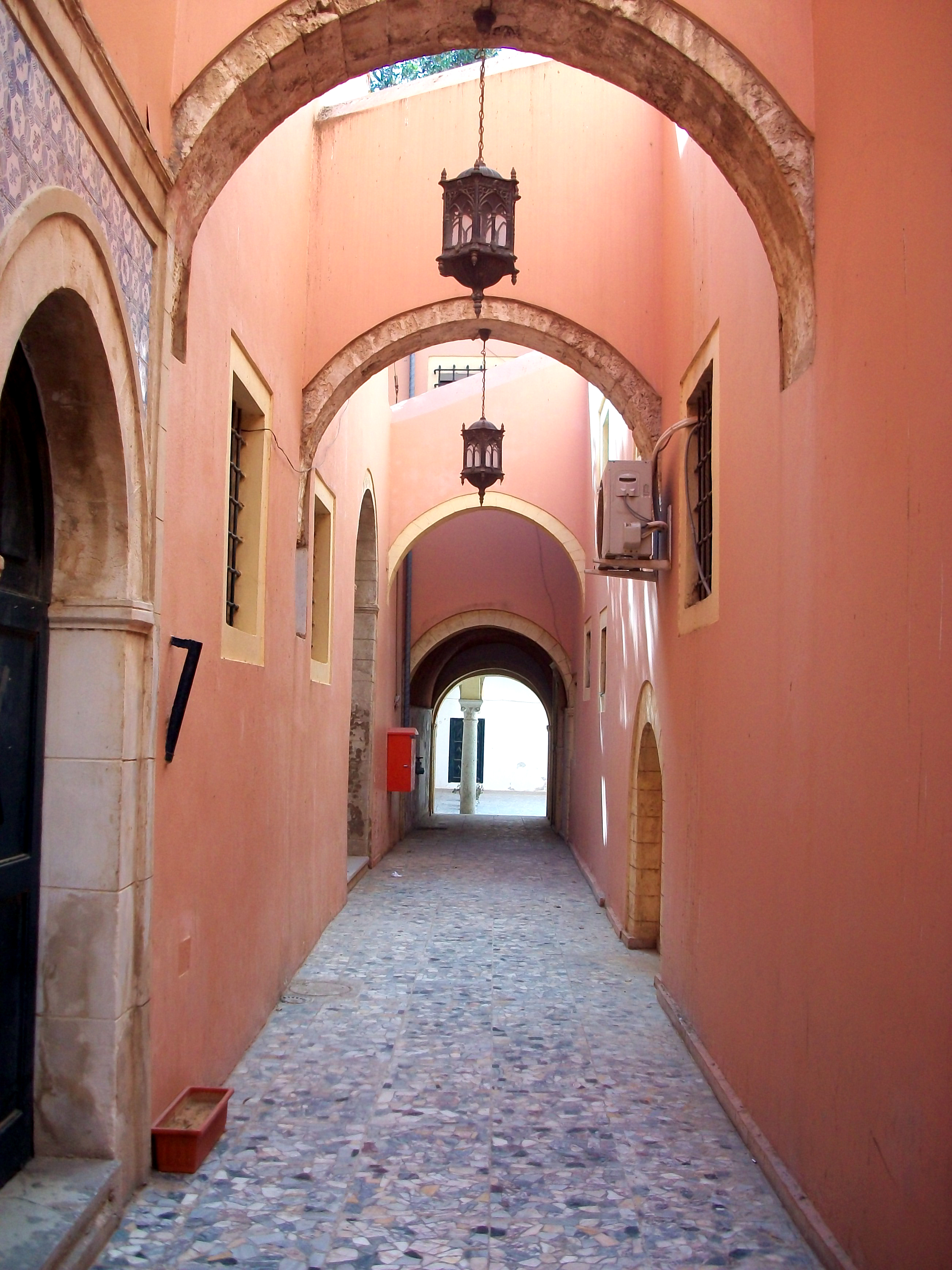
Interior street

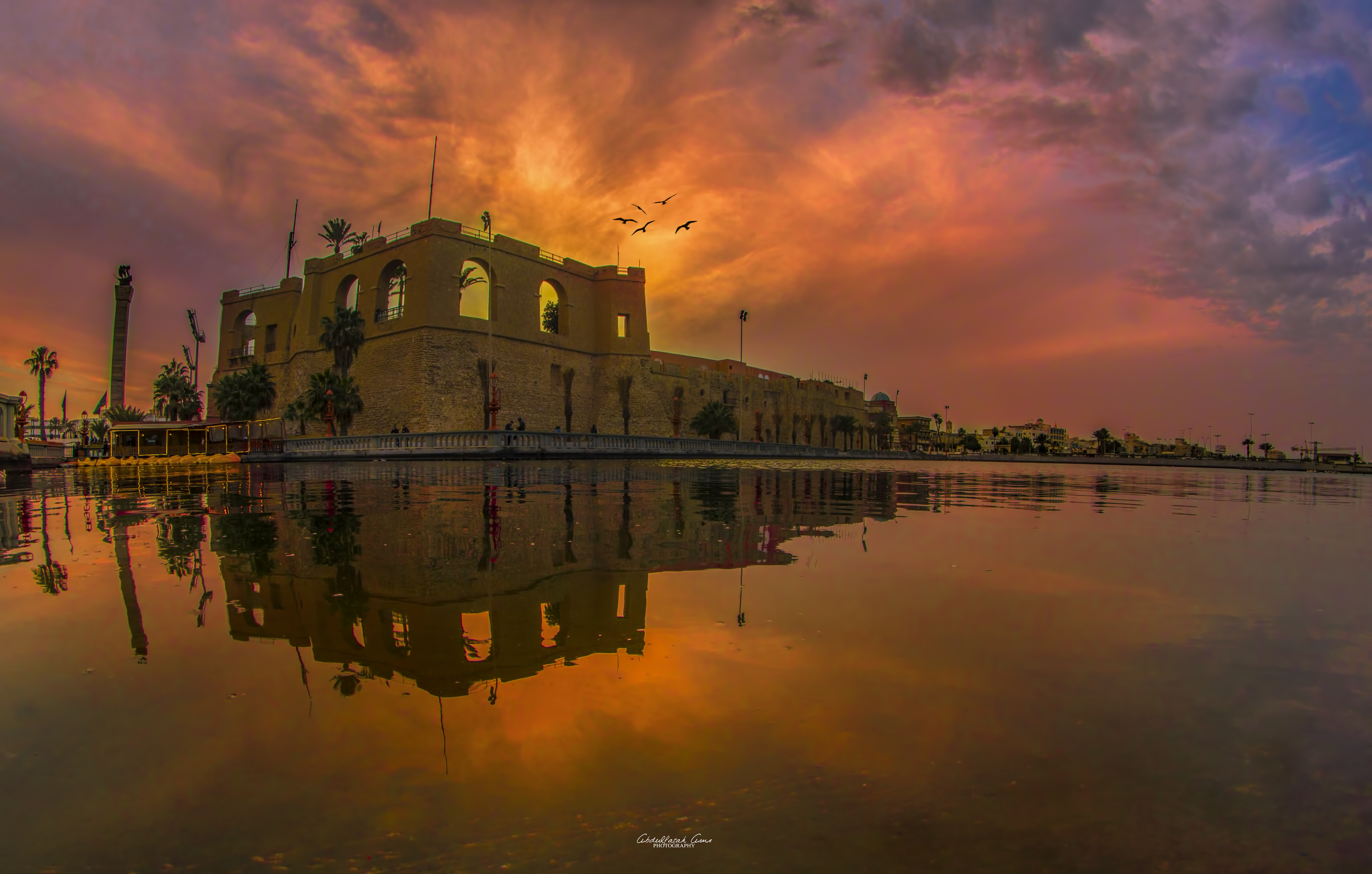
View across the Saraya Lake (originally seaside front)

== See also ==
- Tabarka
- Borj El Kebir
- List of Knights Hospitaller sites
