= Hafiz Mehmed Pasha (died 1903) =

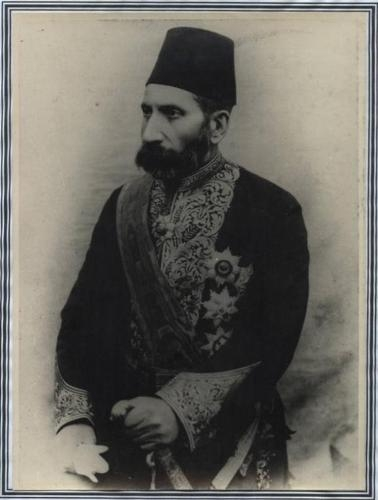
Hafız Mehmed Paşa

Hafiz Mehmed Pasha was an Ottoman official of Turkish origin.

== Career ==
Mehmed Pasha was the Ottoman wali (governor) of the Kosovo vilayet between 1894 and 1899. He had previously served as mutesarif of Pristina. From July 1900 to 1903 he was Wali of Tripoli, covering Ottoman Tripolitania. In January 1903, it was reported he would be transferred to the Manastir vilayet in the Balkans.

Preceded by Ibrahim Edhem Pasha	Governor of the Kosovo Vilayet; 1894–1899	Succeeded by Reshad Bey Pasha
