= Royal Miramare Theatre =

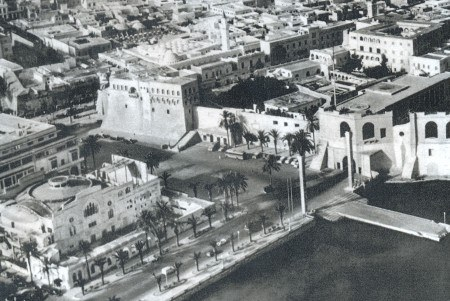
- The theatre is the white building in the left foreground (circa 1950s).
- Interactive map of Royal Miramare Theatre
- Address: Martyrs' Square (formerly Green Square); Tripoli; Libya

Construction
- Demolished: late 1960s

The Royal Miramare Theatre was a theatre located at Martyrs' Square (formerly Green Square) built in 1925 in Tripoli, Libya. It was located next to the Red Castle. In the 1950s, the theatre was the centre of theatrical activity in Libya. It was demolished in the late 1960s by Muammar Gaddafi, who became Libya's autocratic ruler in 1969.

== See also ==
- List of buildings and structures in Libya
