= Pasha of Tripoli =

Title of the ruler of Ottoman Tripolitania

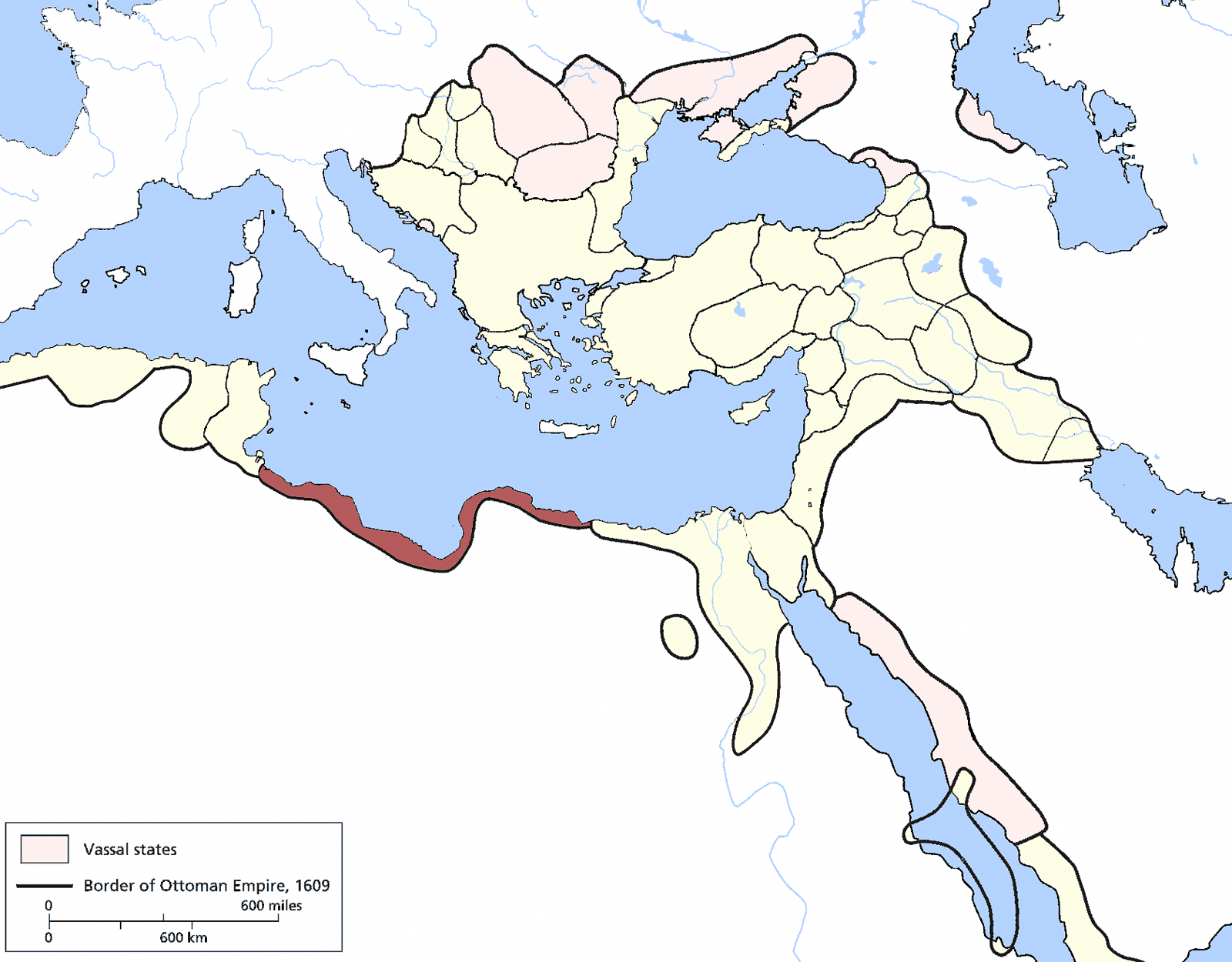
Map of Ottoman Tripolitania (red), 1609.

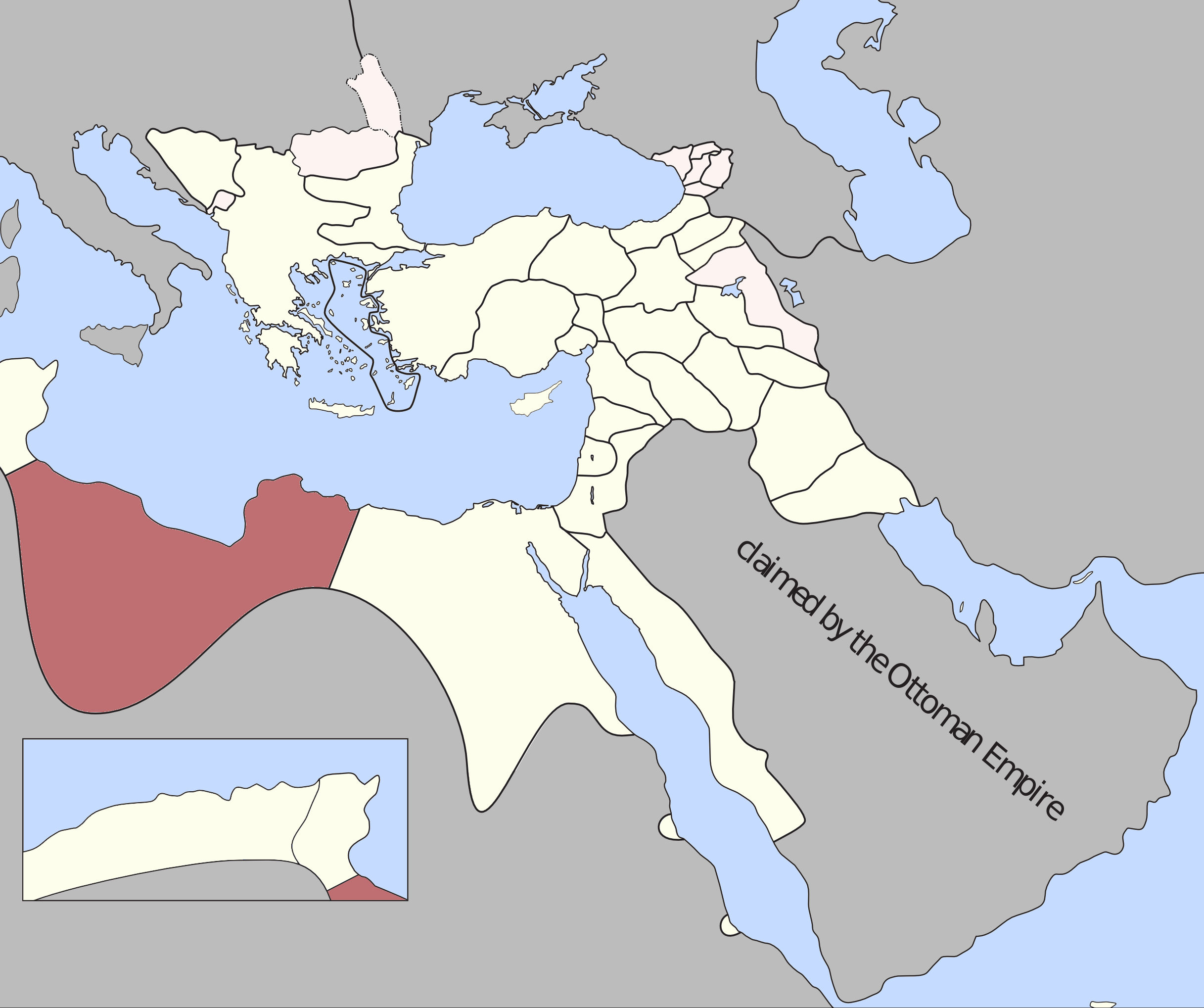
Map of Ottoman Tripolitania (red), 1795.

Map of Ottoman Tripolitania (red), 1900.

Flag of Ottoman Tripolitania

Pasha of Tripoli was a title that was held by many rulers of Tripoli in Ottoman Tripolitania. The Ottoman Empire ruled the territory for most time from the Siege of Tripoli in 1551 until the Italian invasion of Libya in 1911, at the onset of the Italo-Turkish War.

== List ==
| Tenure | Portrait | Incumbent | Notes |
|---|---|---|---|
Tripoli Province (Ottoman Suzerainty)
| 15 August 1551 to 1556 | | Murad Agha, Beylerbey | |
| 1556 to 23 June 1565 | | Turgut (Dragut) Reis, Beylerbey | Died during the Great Siege of Malta |
| July 1565 to 27 June 1568 | | Kiliç Ali Pasha, Beylerbey | |
| 27 June 1568 to 28 March 1571 | | Yahya Pasha, Beylerbey | |
| 28 March 1571 to 1572 | | Cafer Pasha, Beylerbey | |
| 1572 to 1574 | | Mustafa Pasha, Beylerbey | |
| 1574 to 5 July 1577 | | Haydar Pasha, Beylerbey | 1st time |
| 5 July 1577 to 1578 | | Hasan Pasha, Beylerbey | |
| 1578 to 1584 | | Haydar Pasha, Beylerbey | 2nd time |
| 1584 to 1585 | | Sakizli Mehmed Pasha, Beylerbey | 1st time |
| 1585 to 1589 | | Ramazan Pasha, Beylerbey | |
| 1589 | | Sakizli Mehmed Pasha, Beylerbey | 2nd time |
| 1589 to October 1590 | | Istanköylü Ahmed Pasha, Beylerbey | |
| October 1590 to 1595 | | Sakizli Mehmed Pasha, Beylerbey | 3rd time |
| 1595 to December 1603 | | Memi Mehmed Pasha, Beylerbey | |
| December 1603 to 1614 | | Safer Dey, Beylerbey | |
| 1614 to 1626 | | Sherif Pasha, Beylerbey | |
| 1626 | | Ramazan Dey, Beylerbey | |
| 1626 to January 1631 | | Sakizli Mehmed Pasha, Beylerbey | |
| January 1631 to 29 April 1672 | | Sakizli Osman Pasha, Beylerbey | Longest-serving Ottoman governor of Tripolitania |
| 29 April 1672 to July 1672 | | Osman Reis as-Suhali, Beylerbey | |
| July 1672 to May 1675 | | Bali Çavush, Beylerbey | |
| 18 May 1675 to January 1677 | | Misirliohlu Ibrahim Pasha, Beylerbey | |
| January 1677 | | Inebolulu Ibrahim Çelebi, Beylerbey | |
| January 1677 to April 1677 | | Istanköylü Büyük Mustafa, Beylerbey | |
| April 1677 to 1678 | | Baba Osman, Beylerbey | |
| 1678 to 1682 | | Ak Mehmed Timur, Beylerbey | |
| 1682 to 21 June 1682 | | Abaza Hüseyin, Beylerbey | |
| 21 June 1682 to 1683 | | Cezayirli Abdullah, Beylerbey | |
| 1683 | | Terzi Ibrahim, Beylerbey | |
| 1683 to October 1687 | | Halil Pasha, Beylerbey | |
| October 1687 to 1689 | | Mehmed Pasha, Beylerbey | 1st time |
| 1689 to 3 February 1695 | | Bosnak Ismail Pasha, Beylerbey | |
| 3 February 1695 to 1 August 1700 | | Destari Mehmed Pasha, Beylerbey | 2nd time |
| 1 August 1700 to 20 November 1700 | | Turgutlulu Kahveci Osman, Beylerbey | |
| 20 November 1700 to December 1702 | | Gelibolulu Haci Mustafa, Beylerbey | |
| December 1702 to 23 November 1710 | | Halil Pasha, Beylerbey | |
| 23 November 1710 to 20 January 1711 | | Ismail Hoça, Beylerbey | |
| 20 January 1711 to 4 July 1711 | | Mehmed Hüseyin Çavush, Beylerbey | |
| 4 July 1711 to 29 July 1711 | | Abu Umays Mahmud, Beylerbey | |
Tripoli Regency (Karamanli dynasty)
| 29 July 1711 to 2 November 1745 | | Ahmad I Pasha (Sidi Hamid Qaramanli Quluglu), Sultan | Took power in the 1711 Karamanli coup |
| 2 November 1745 to 24 July 1754 | | Mehmed Pasha, Sultan | |
| 24 July 1754 to 30 July 1793 | | Ali I Pasha, Sultan | |
| 30 July 1793 to November 1794 | | Seydi Ali (II) Pasha, Sultan | Usurper |
| November 1794 to 24 January 1796 | | Ahmad II Bey, Sultan | |
| 24 January 1796 to 5 August 1832 | | Yusuf Pasha, Sultan | Ruled during the Barbary Wars against the United States |
| 1817 | | Mehmed, Sultan | In rebellion, 1st time |
| 1824 | | Mehmed ibn `Ali, Sultan | In rebellion, 1st time |
| 1826 | | Mehmed, Sultan | In rebellion, 2nd time |
| July 1832 | | Mehmed, Sultan | In rebellion, 3rd time |
| 1835 | | Mehmed ibn `Ali, Sultan | In rebellion, 2nd time |
| 5 August 1832 to 26 May 1835 | | Ali II Pasha, Sultan | |
Tripoli Province (Ottoman Suzerainty)
| 26 May 1835 to 7 September 1835 | | Mustafa Negib Pasha, Wali | Governor |
| 7 September 1835 to 6 May 1837 | | Mahmud Raif Pasha, Wali | Governor |
| 6 May 1837 to 5 September 1838 | | Çeshmeli Hasan Pasha, Wali | Governor |
| 5 September 1838 to 15 July 1842 | | Ali Asker Pasha, Wali | Governor |
| 15 July 1842 to 22 April 1847 | | Mehmed Emin Pasha, Wali | Governor |
| 22 April 1847 to 13 September 1849 | | Ragib Pasha, Wali | Governor |
| 13 September 1849 to 16 September 1852 | | Izzet Ahmed Pasha, Wali | Governor |
| 16 September 1852 to 1 November 1855 | | Mustafa Nuri Pasha, Wali | Governor |
| 1 November 1855 to 1 October 1857 | | Osman Pasha, Wali | Governor |
| 1 October 1857 to 4 August 1860 | | Ahmed Izzet Pasha, Wali | Governor, 1st time |
| 4 August 1860 to 18 June 1867 | | Mahmud Nedim Pasha, Wali | Governor |
| June 1867 to July 1867 | | Hassan Pasha, acting Wali | acting Governor |
| July 1867 to May 1870 | | Cezayrli Ali Reza Pasha, Wali | Governor, 1st time |
| May 1870 to June 1870 | | Mustafa Pasha, acting Wali | acting Governor |
| June 1870 to September 1871 | | Mehmed Halet Pasha, Wali | Governor |
| September 1871 to April 1872 | | Bostancibahizade Mehmed Rashid Pasha, Wali | Governor |
| April 1872 to 6 June 1873 | | Cezayrli Ali Reza Pasha, Wali | Governor, 2nd time |
| 6 June 1873 to November 1874 | | Hasan Samih Pasha, Wali | Governor |
| November 1874 to February 1875 | | Mustafa Asim Pasha, Wali | Governor |
| February 1875 to August 1877 | | Mustafa Sidki Pasha, Wali | Governor |
| 1877 | | Mehmed Çelaleddin Pasha, Wali | Governor |
| December 1877 to February 1878 | | Söylemezoglu Ali Kemali, Wali | Governor |
| February 1878 to July 1879 | | Mehmed Sabri Pasha, Wali | Governor |
| July 1879 to May 1880 | | Ahmed Izzet Pasha, Wali | Governor, 2nd time |
| May 1880 to October 1881 | | Mehmed Nazif Pasha, Wali | Governor |
| October 1881 to June 1896 | | Ahmed Rasim Pasha, Wali | Governor |
| June 1896 to March 1899 | | Nemik Bey, Wali | Governor |
| March 1899 to July 1900 | | Haçim Bey, Wali | Governor |
| July 1900 to December 1903 | | Hafiz Mehmed Pasha, Wali | Governor |
| December 1903 to May 1904 | | Hasan Husni Pasha (Hüseyin Effendi), Wali | Governor |
| May 1904 to August 1904 | | Abderrahman Bey, acting Wali | acting Governor |
| August 1904 to August 1908 | | Rexhep Pasha, Wali | Governor |
| December 1908 to August 1909 | | Ahmed Favzi Pasha, Wali | Governor |
| August 1909 to August 1910 | | Hüseyin Husni Pasha, Wali | Governor |
| August 1910 to 1911 | | Ibrahim Pasha, acting Wali | acting Governor |
| 1911 | | Bekir Samih Bey, Wali | Governor, did not take office |
| 1911 to 5 October 1911 | | Besim Bey, acting Wali | acting Governor |
| 1911 to 15 January 1913 | | Neshet Bey, Wali | Governor |
| 1913 to 1915 | | ...., Wali | Governor, in exile |
| 1915 to 1917 | | Osman Bey, Wali | Governor, in exile |
| 1917 to 1918 | | Nuri Bey, Wali | Governor, in exile |
| 1918 | | Ishaq Bey, Wali | Governor, in exile |
| April 1918 to 16 November 1918 | | Osman Fuad Pasha, Wali | Governor, in exile |

For continuation after Italian conquest, see: List of colonial governors of Italian Tripolitania and List of colonial governors of Italian Cyrenaica

== See also ==
- Red Castle of Tripoli
- Ottoman Tripolitania
- Italian Libya
  - List of governors-general of Italian Libya
- Italian Tripolitania
  - List of colonial governors of Italian Tripolitania
- Italian Cyrenaica
  - List of colonial governors of Italian Cyrenaica
