= Martyrs' Square, Tripoli =

Square in Tripoli, Libya

Martyrs' Square ميدان الشهداء Maydān ash-Shuhadā'
- Neighborhood
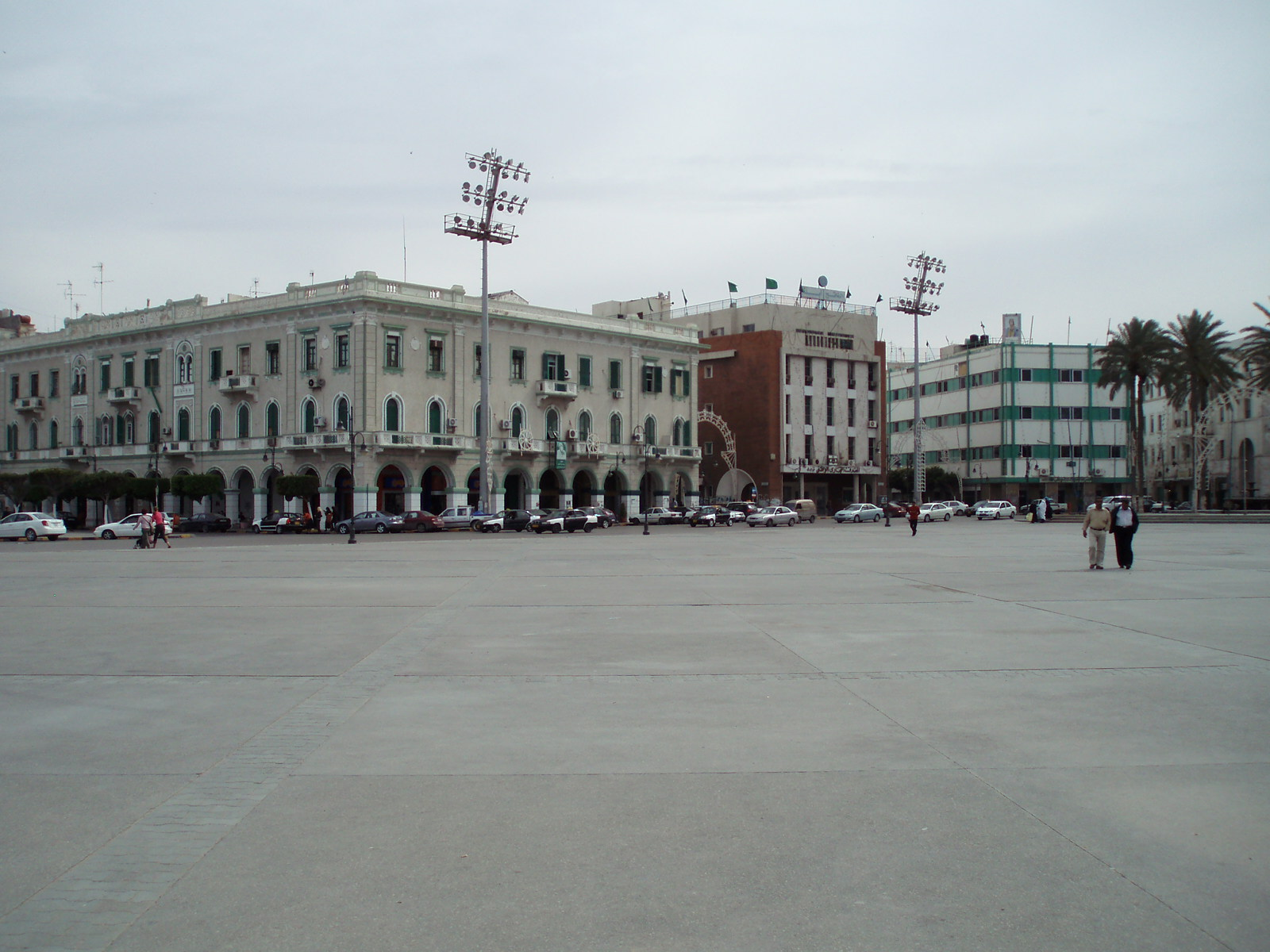
- The Martyrs' Square (then known as "Green Square") in 2007
- Features: fountain
- Dedicated to: 2011 Battle of Tripoli
- Location: Intersection of Independence Street, Omar Mukhtar Avenue, 24 December Avenue and Mizran Street; Tripoli, Libya
- Interactive map of Martyrs' Square ميدان الشهداء; Maydān ash-Shuhadā'
- Coordinates: 32°53′42″N 13°10′52″E

The Martyrs' Square (Arabic: ميدان الشهداء Maydān ash-Shuhadā'), known as Green Square (الساحة الخضراء as-Sāḥah al-Khaḍrā') under the Gaddafi government, Independence Square (ميدان الاستقلال Maydān al-Istiqlāl) during the monarchy, and originally (during Italian colonial rule) known as Piazza Italia ("Italy Square"), is a downtown landmark at the bay in the city of Tripoli, Libya. The main commercial center of the city surrounds the square. The Square is also a main tourist attraction in Tripoli. It has a large legendary fountain designed by an Italian architect at the centre of the square. The square is the meeting point of many different avenues. Omar Mukhtar Avenue is one of the longest in North Africa; it was built by Italians in the colonial era, and Libyans during the era of King Idris I. Independence Street branches from the square too, and it leads to the Palace of King Idris I. 24 December Avenue is also an Italian-built avenue. Mizran Street is the last street that branches from the Martyrs' Square.

== History ==
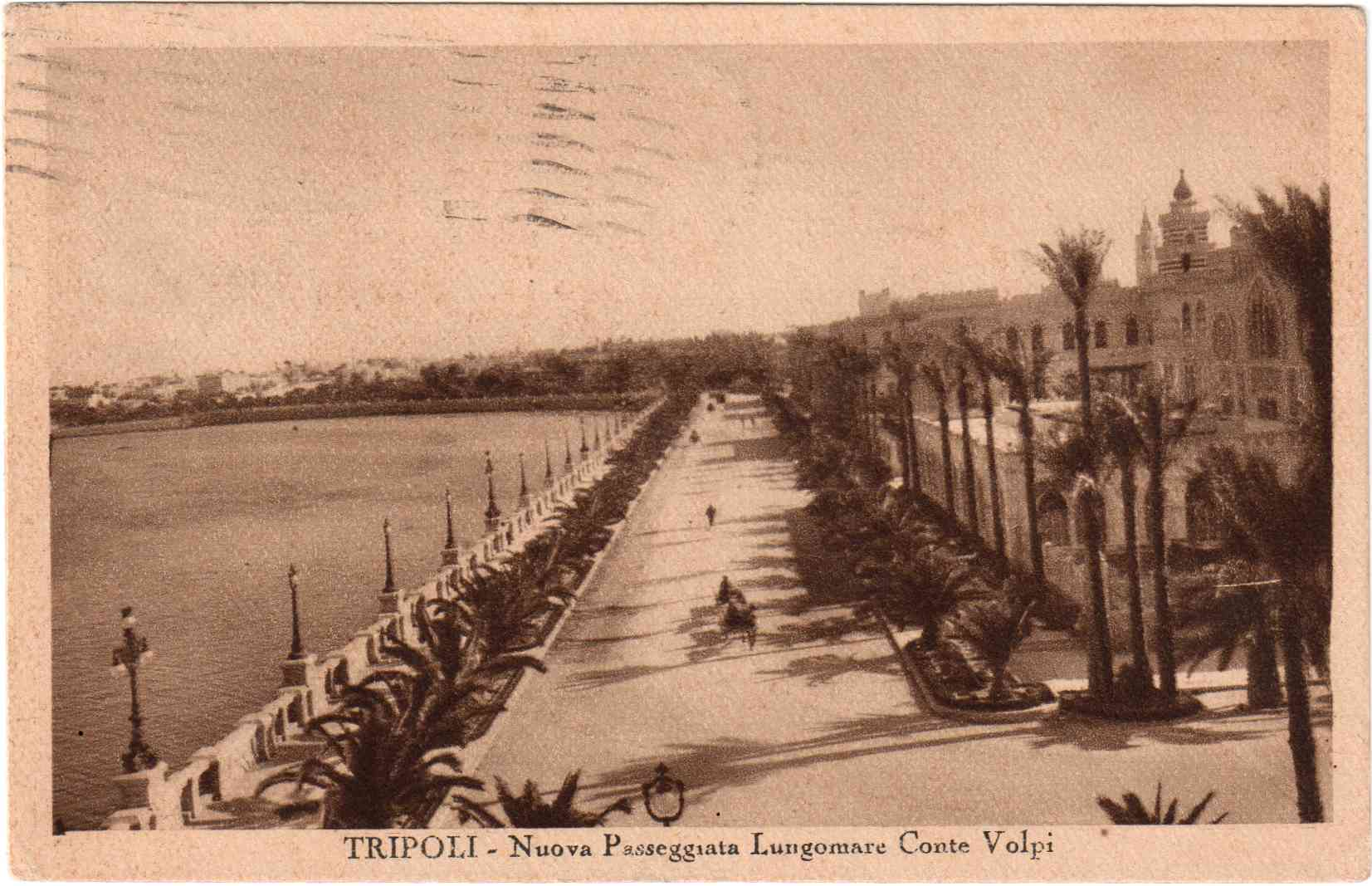
1935 postcard of Tripoli's Conte Volpi Corniche, the entrance to Piazza Italia visible on the right, with the Teatro Miramare behind. The old shoreline and seawall is on the left, before moving by landfill expansions.

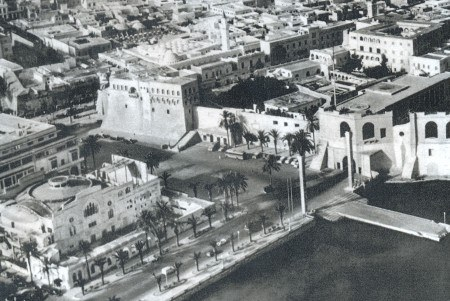
Aerial view of Independence Square with the Red Castle and the Royal Miramare Theatre (lower left side) during the 1950s.

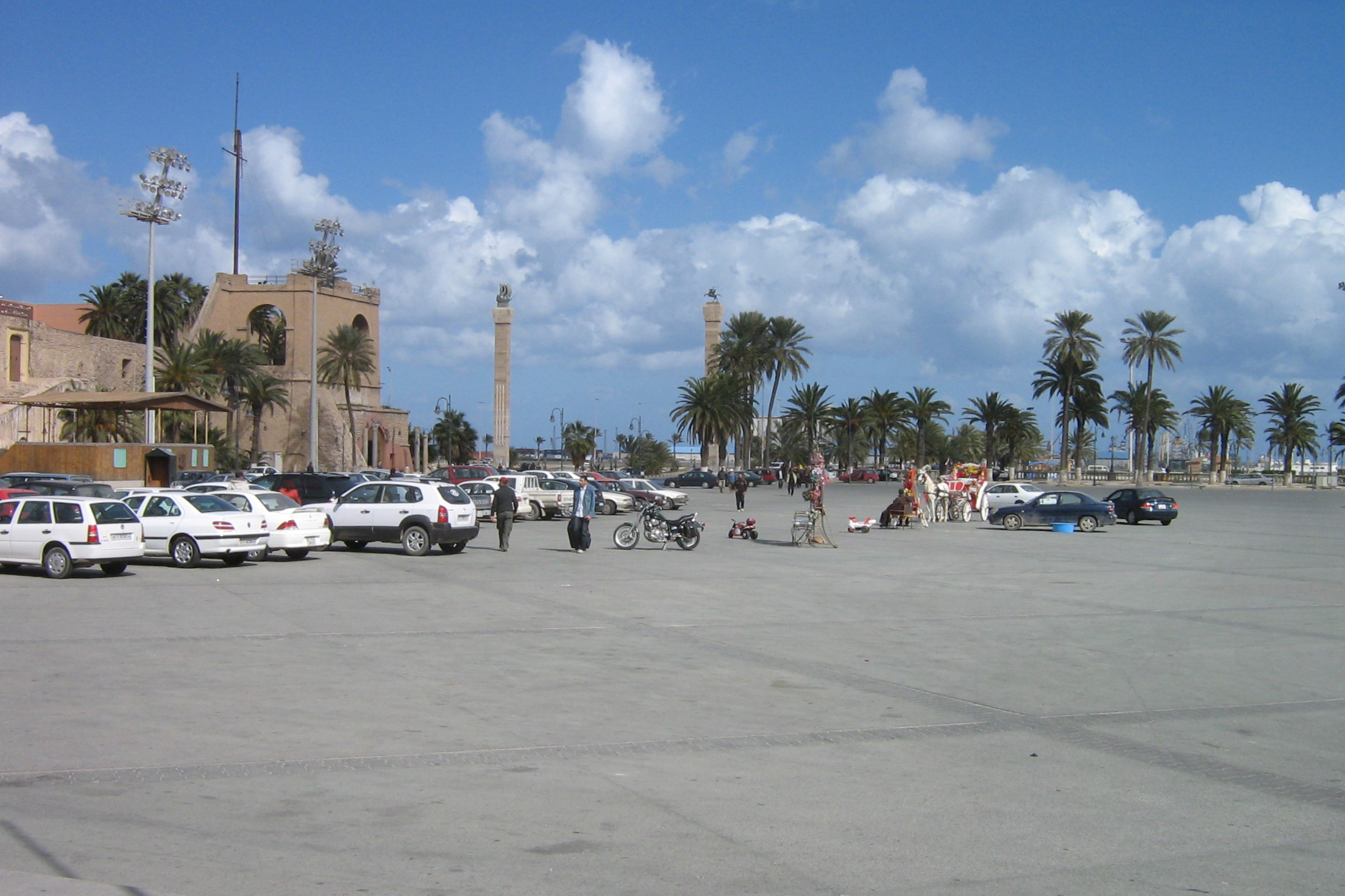
Looking from Green Square north towards the sea. On the left is the Red Castle (2008).

The square was originally constructed by the Italian colonial rulers on the site of the old bread market (sūq al-khubs), and it was expanded on several occasions during the 1930s.

During the Italian colonial period, it was called Piazza Italia ("Italy Square"). After Libyan independence in 1951, it was known as "Independence Square" during the Libyan monarchy (1951–1969). After the 1969 revolution by Gaddafi, the square was renamed again to "Green Square" to mark his political philosophy in his Green Book.

=== 2011 Libyan civil war ===
On the night of 21–22 August, Libyan rebel groups took control of the area during the 2011 Battle of Tripoli and started referring to it as Martyrs' Square to dissociate the square from the Gaddafi government and to commemorate those who died in the fight against his government. On Eid ul-Fitr (31 August) and again on 2 September, tens of thousands of Tripoli residents, including many women and children, gathered on Martyrs' Square to celebrate the end of Gaddafi's rule.

== Facilities ==
It features the Red Castle (As-saraya Al-hamra), which hosts Libya's Antiquities Department and the National Museum with a collection of Phoenician, Greek and Roman artefacts. The museum also exhibits a statue of Venus from the Hadrianic Baths at Leptis, a complete Libyan-Roman tomb from the Ghirza region, and a colourful Volkswagen Beetle used by Colonel Gaddafi leading up to the revolution. On the other side, a wide avenue leading towards the seafront with two tall pillars. On top of the pillars are an iron-cast, miniature wooden ship; the other one features a horseback rider.

The Royal Miramare Theatre used to be located across from the Red Castle, but it was demolished by Gaddafi's government after the 1960s to create space for large demonstrations.
