= Mehmed Saqizli =

Mehmed Saqizli (Turkish: Sakızlı Mehmed Paşa, literally, Mehmed Pasha of Chios) (died 1649), (r. 1631 – 1649) was Dey and Pasha of Tripolis. He was born into a Christian family of Greek origin on the island of Chios (known in Ottoman Turkish as Sakız, hence his epithet "Sakızlı") and had converted to Islam after living in Algeria for years. His rule was effective, bringing peace and prosperity to Tripolitania and increasing trade. He tried to put Cyrenaica under its control, and was tolerant in religious matters, allowing the Franciscans missionaries to assist the Christian slaves. His successor was Osman Saqizli, who continued his policy.

== See also ==
- Pasha of Tripoli
