= Osman Saqizli =

Osman Saqizli (Turkish: Sakızlı Osman Paşa, literally, Osman Pasha of Chios) (died 1672), (r. 1649 – 1672) was Dey and Pasha of Tripolis. He was born into a Greek Christian family on the island of Chios (known in Ottoman Turkish as Sakız, hence his epithet "Sakızlı") and had converted to Islam. His rule was effective, continuing the policy of his predecessor Mehmed Saqizli. He occupied Cyrenaica, and was tolerant in religious matters. The damages caused by the pirates of Tripoli to European trade often put him in conflict with the European powers. Consequently, Tripoli was bombed in retaliation in 1654 by the British Navy under Robert Blake, in 1662 by the Dutch Navy and again under Michiel de Ruyter in 1669, and finally in 1672 by the French Navy. Osman preyed so aggressively on Levant Company shipping in the 1650s that the Company petitioned Cromwell's government for action. In the following decade, John Lawson managed a peace treaty with Osman (along with Tunis and Algiers) to secure safety of passing English ships. He died in 1672, and with his death started a period of instability for his country.

== See also ==
- Pasha of Tripoli
