= 1920–1922 Jabal al-Gharbi civil war =

Early 20th Century war in Middle East North Africa region

1920-22 Jabal al-Gharbi civil war
Date	1920-1922
Location	Libya 31.8649°N 11.7933°E
- Location within Libya

The 1920-22 Jabal al-Gharbi civil war was a conflict which occurred in the Nafusa Mountains and surrounding areas, in what is today the country of Libya, fought between local tribal leaders competing for political offices in the Tripolitanian Republic.
