= Yusuf Karamanli =

Pasha of Ottoman Tripolitania from 1795 to 1832

- Pasha of Tripoli
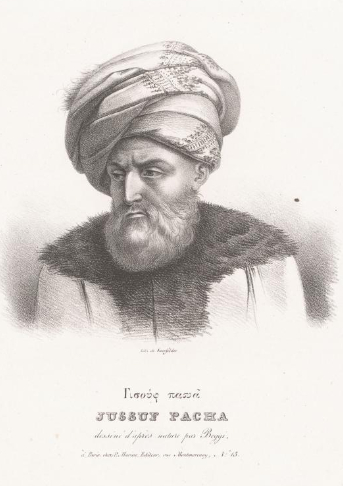
- Portrait of Yusuf Karamanli
- Predecessor: Ali Pasha (usurper)
- Successor: Ali II
- Born: 1766; Tripoli, Ottoman Tripolitania
- Died: 1838 (aged 72)
- Dynasty: Karamanli dynasty
- Father: Ali I
- Religion: Sunni Islam

Yusuf (ibn Ali) Karamanli, Caramanli or Qaramanli or al-Qaramanli (most commonly Yusuf Karamanli), (1766–1838) was the longest-reigning Pasha of the Karamanli dynasty of Ottoman Tripolitania (in present-day Libya). He is noted for his role in the Barbary Wars against the United States.

== Assumption of the throne ==
Born in Tripoli in 1766, Karamanli, a member of the Karamanli dynasty (named after the Karamanids in Turkey), was originally of Turkish origin. His brother, Hamet Karamanli, was deposed from leadership in 1793 by Ottoman Empire officer Ali Pasha, who proceeded to exile the Karamanli family and claim Ottoman rule over Tripoli. In 1795, Hamet and Yusuf returned to Tripoli, and with the aid of Hammuda Pasha of the neighboring Barbary state of Tunis, recaptured it from Ali Pasha. Yusuf then had his brother exiled to Alexandria, Egypt and claimed the throne for himself.

== Barbary Wars ==
A scan of the original Treaty of Peace and Friendship between the United States of America and the Bey and Subjects of Tripoli of Barbary, known popularly as the Treaty of Tripoli, written in Arabic, signed 4 November 1796.

In 1796, Karamanli drafted and signed the Treaty of Tripoli, which permitted the passage of American commercial ships through Tripolitanian waters. In 1801, Karamanli allegedly violated the treaty by demanding a tribute of $225,000 from the third American President Thomas Jefferson. Jefferson, confident in the ability of the fledgling United States Navy (newly reinforced with the building of six heavy frigates beginning in 1797) to protect American shipping, refused the Pasha's demands. This led the Pasha to unofficially declare war in May 1801 by chopping down the flagpole with the American flag before the U.S. consulate.

The U.S. Navy attempted to blockade Tripoli's harbors with a squadron sent by President Jefferson in 1803. After some initial military successes, most notably the capture of the grounded American frigate USS Philadelphia in October 1803, the Pasha soon found himself threatened after a raid led by US Navy lieutenant Stephen Decatur to burn and scuttle the Philadelphia in Tripoli's harbor. By 1805, following a defeat at the Battle of Derna as well as the allied recruitment of his deposed brother Hamet Karamanli by American army officer and diplomatic consul William Eaton, Karamanli was forced to capitulate. He signed a treaty with American emissary Tobias Lear of the U.S. Department of State that officially ended the war on 10 June 1805.

== Al-Jawazi massacre ==
On 5 September 1817, Yusuf Karamanli invited the leaders of the al-Jawazi tribe of Libya to his castle in Benghazi, following a dispute regarding tribute and an al-Jawazi uprising against his rule. Consequently, the Pasha ordered the execution of all attendees and of all other tribe members, which resulted in a massacre of at least 10,000 people. Survivors eventually sought refuge in neighboring countries, especially in Egypt.

== Decline of the Karamanli dynasty ==
By 1819, the various treaties of the Napoleonic Wars had forced the Barbary states to give up corsair activity almost entirely, and Tripoli's economy began to crumble. Karamanli attempted to compensate for lost revenue by encouraging the trans-Saharan slave trade, but with abolitionist sentiment on the rise in Europe and to a lesser degree in the United States, this failed to salvage Tripoli's economy. As Karamanli weakened, factions sprung up around his three sons; though Karamanli abdicated in 1832 in favor of his son Ali II, civil war soon resulted. Ottoman Sultan Mahmud II in Istanbul sent in troops ostensibly to restore order, but they instead deposed and exiled Ali II, marking the end of both the Karamanli dynasty and an independent Tripoli.

== Notes ==
1. Hume 311.
2. US Country Studies

== Bibliography ==
- Fredriksen, John C. (2001), "Karamanli, Yusuf", America's Military Adversaries: From Colonial Times to the Present, ABC-CLIO, ISBN 1-57607-603-2.

== Books ==
- LAFI (Nora), Une ville du Maghreb entre ancien régime et réformes ottomanes. Genèse des institutions municipales à Tripoli de Barbarie (1795–1911), Paris, L'Harmattan, 2002, 305 p.

Preceded by Ahmad II Pasha	Pasha of Tripoli; 1795–1832	Succeeded by Ali II
