= Ahmed Karamanli =

Pasha of Tripolitania from 1711 to 1745

First Pasha of Tripoli
- In office 1711–1745

Personal details
- Born: 1686
- Died: 1745 (aged 58–59)

Ahmed or Ahmed Karamanli or Qaramanli or al-Qaramanli, (most commonly Ahmed Karamanli) (1686–1745) was an Ottoman official of Janissary background. He founded the Karamanli dynasty (1711–1835) of Tripolitania or Tripoli (in present-day Libya). He reigned (1711–1745), as the first Karamanli ruler of Tripolitania.

In the early 18th century, the Ottoman Empire was losing its grip on its North African holdings, including Tripoli. A period of civil war ensued, with no ruler able to hold office for more than a year. Ahmed Karamanli, a Janissary and popular cavalry officer, murdered the Ottoman governor and seized the throne in the 1711 Karamanli coup. After persuading the Ottomans to recognize him as governor, Ahmed established himself as ruler and made his post hereditary. Though Tripoli continued to pay nominal tribute to the Ottoman padishah, it acted otherwise as an independent kingdom.

An intelligent and able man, Ahmed greatly expanded his city's economy, particularly through the employment of corsairs on crucial Mediterranean shipping routes. Nations that wished to protect their ships from the corsairs were forced to pay tribute to the pasha. On land, Ahmed expanded Tripoli's control as far as Fezzan and Cyrenaica before his death in 1745.

Ahmed's successors proved less capable rulers, however, and the kingdom was soon wracked by internal strife. The Karamanli dynasty would end a century later as the Ottomans retook control.

== See also ==
- 1711 Karamanli coup
