= List of hotels: Countries L =

This is a list of what are intended to be the notable top hotels by country, five or four star hotels, notable skyscraper landmarks or historic hotels which are covered in multiple reliable publications. It should not be a directory of every hotel in every country:

== Laos ==
- Amantaka, Luang Prabang
- Ban Pako
- Don Chan Palace, Vientiane
- Hotel Beau Rivage Mekong, Vientiane
- Lao Plaza Hotel, Vientiane
- Settha Palace Hotel, Vientiane
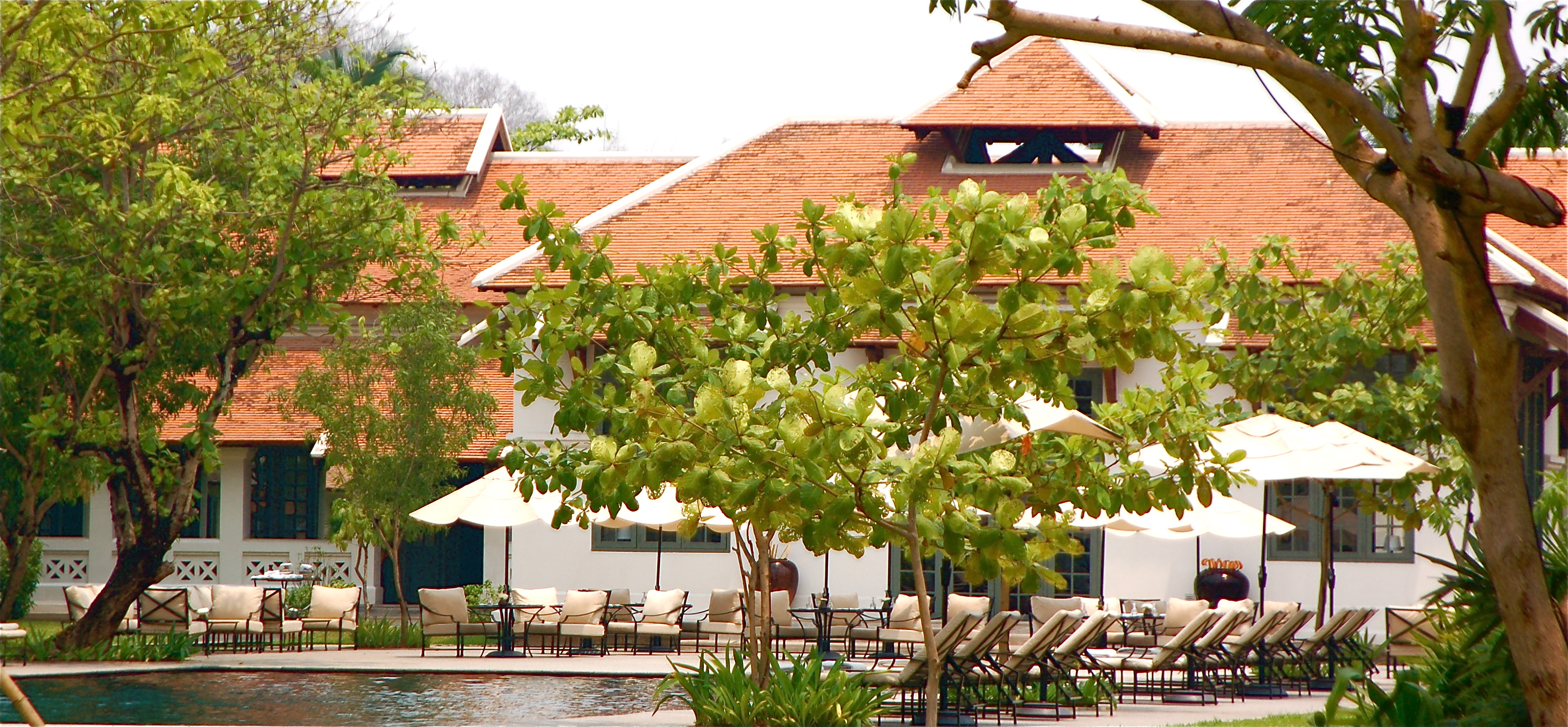
Amantaka

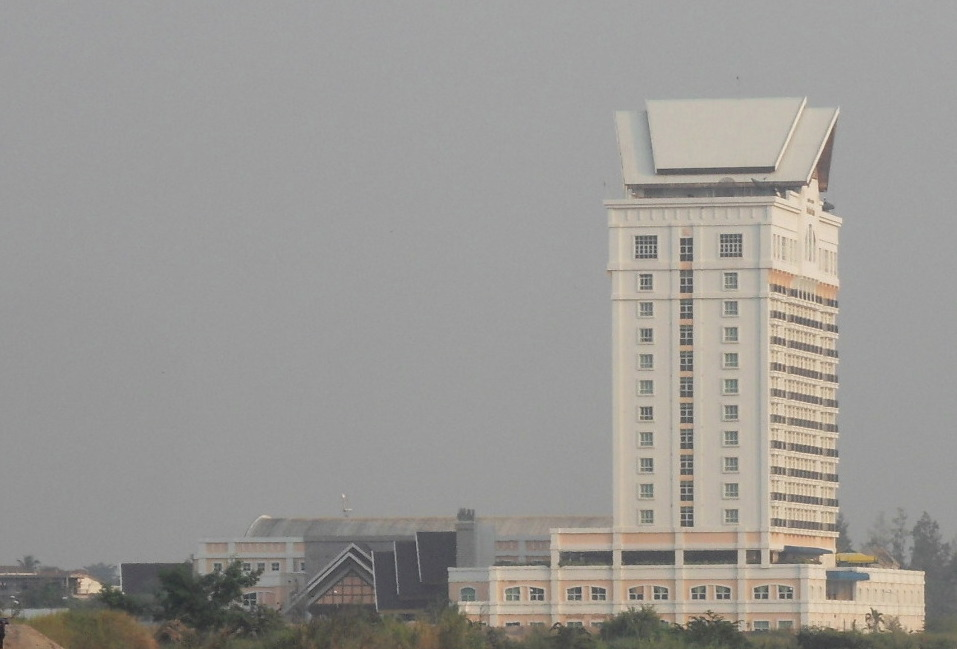
Don Chan Palace

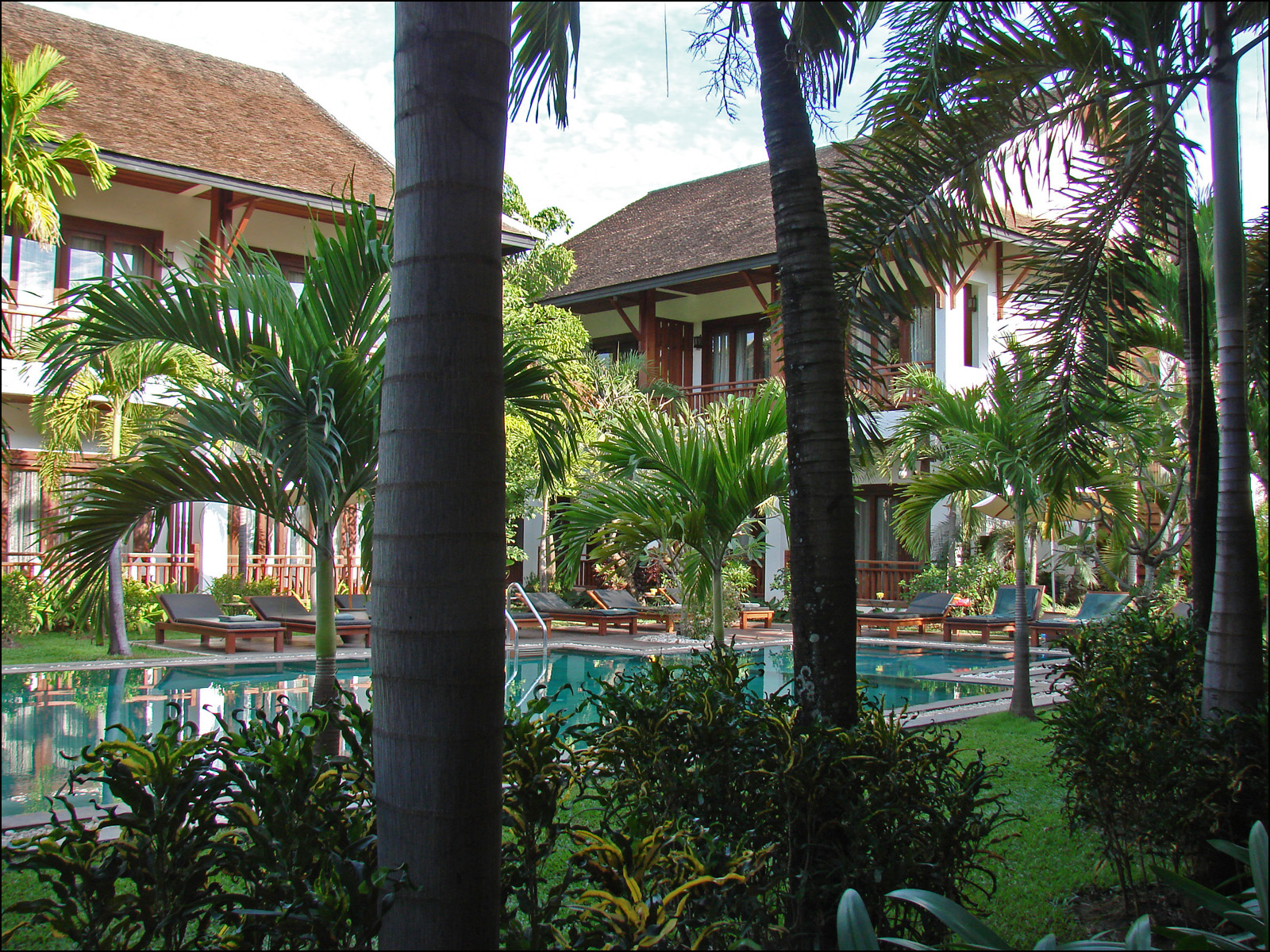
Green Park Boutique Hotel

== Latvia ==
- Gallery Park Hotel, Riga, Riga
- Grand Palace Hotel, Riga

== Lebanon ==
- Beirut Marriott Hotel, Beirut
- Chtaura Park Hotel, Bekaa
- Crowne Plaza Hotel, Beirut
- InterContinental Phoenicia Beirut Hotel, Beirut
- Le Vendôme Intercontinental Hotel, Beirut
- Metropolitan Palace Hotel, Beirut
- Safir Helipolitan Hotel, Beirut
Metropolitan Palace Hotel

== Liberia ==
- Ducor Intercontinental Hotel, Monrovia
- Hotel Africa, Victoria, near Monrovia

== Libya ==
- Corinthia Hotel Tripoli, Tripoli
- Grand Hotel Tripoli, Tripoli
- Hotel Al Mehari, Tripoli
- Hotel Casinò Uaddan, Tripoli
- Hotel Tobruk, Tobruk
- Tibesti Hotel, Benghazi
- Uzu Hotel, Benghazi
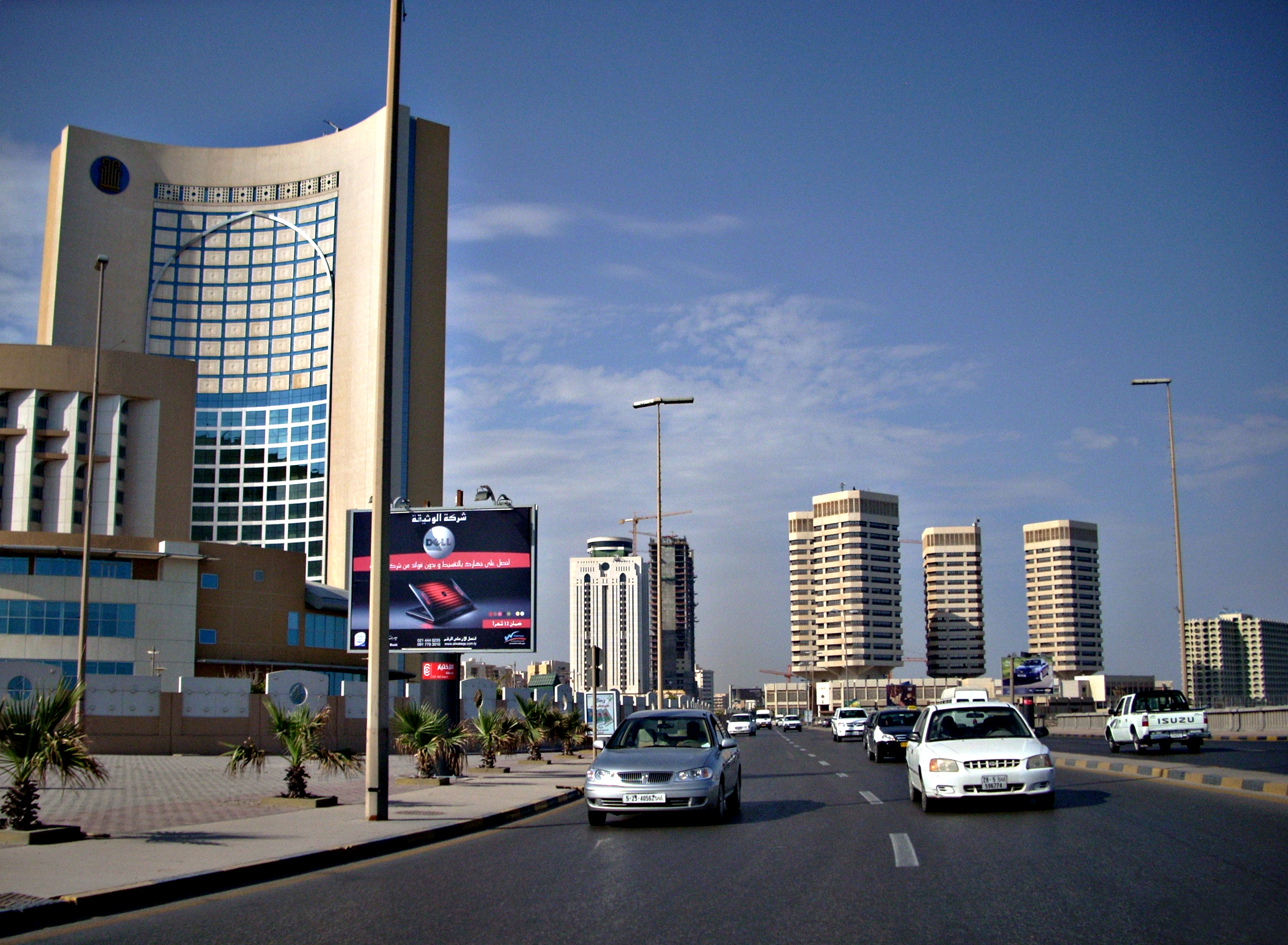
Corinthia Hotel Tripoli

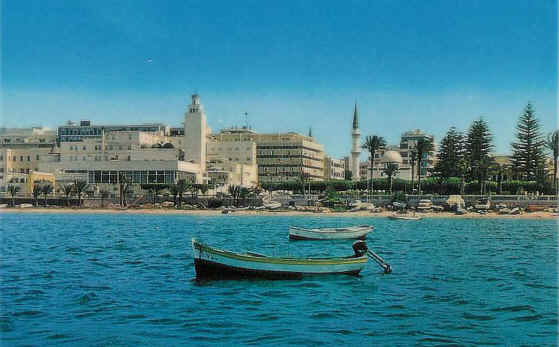
Hotel Casinò Uaddan

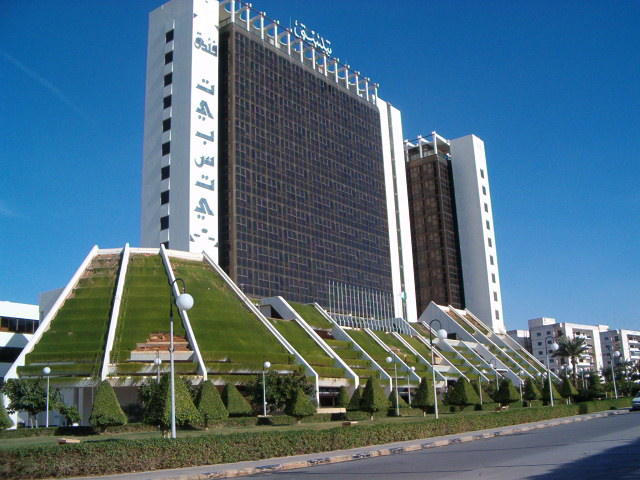
Tibesti Hotel
