= A. Doris Banks Henries =

American educator and writer

A. Doris Banks Henries (February 11, 1913 – February 16, 1981) was an American educator and writer in Liberia, and Assistant Minister of Education during the Tolbert administration.

== Early life and education ==
Artiste Doris Banks was born in Live Oak, Florida, and educated in Middletown, Connecticut. She received teacher training at Willimantic Normal School, and pursued graduate education at Columbia University, where she earned a master's degree and completed her doctorate.

== Career ==
During the 1930s, she worked as principal at Fuller Normal School in Greenville, South Carolina. Dr. Banks first traveled to Liberia as a Methodist missionary in 1939. She became a professor at Liberia College in 1942. She was dean of William V. S. Tubman Teachers College until 1955, when she became an administrator at the University of Liberia. In 1959, she became Director of Higher Education and Textbook Research in Liberia's Department of Public Instruction. In that role, she worked for Africanization in curricular materials, saying "It should be the policy of African schools to include in all programs as much literature written by Africans as is available." She served as president of the Liberian National Teachers Organization and the National YMCA, and chaired the Liberian Methodist Board of Education. She rose to the rank of Assistant Minister of Education in 1978.

Banks Henries wrote a biography of Liberian president William V. S. Tubman, published in 1967. She also edited collections of Liberian poetry (1963), and of Liberian folklore (1967). In her work as a government official, she was credited as author of many official reports, textbooks, and books about Liberia for young readers. She served as president of the Society of Liberian Authors.

== Selected works ==
- A. Doris Banks Henries. The Liberian Nation: A Short History (1954).
- A. Doris Banks Henries. Civics for Liberian Schools (1966).
- A. Doris Banks Henries. A Biography of William V. S. Tubman (1968).
- A. Doris Banks Henries. Higher Education in Liberia: Retrospect — Present — Prospect (1974).

== Personal life ==
In 1942, Doris Banks married Richard Abrom Henries, a Liberian government official whose first wife was Angie Brooks. Her husband, Speaker of the Liberian House of Representatives, was executed by firing squad in 1980, after a military coup. Dr. Banks Henries died from cancer the following year, in Middletown, Connecticut, right after her 68th birthday.

There is an A. Doris Banks Henries Scholarship Committee in Middletown, which grants scholarship funds to high school seniors in Middlesex County, Connecticut.

A. Doris Banks was a member of Zeta Phi Beta sorority. She served as the first regional director for Africa in 1949. She was a member of the Delta Iota Zeta chapter in Monrovia, Liberia, Africa.
