= Don Chan =

Don Chan may refer to:

- Don Chan Palace, hotel in Vientiane, Laos
- Don Chan District in Kalasin Province, Thailand
- Don Chan 2 Slot, Java applet video game
- Don Chan Puzzle: Hanabi de Don!, Japanese video game created by Takumi Corporation and Aruze
- Don-chan, a character from Mahōtsukai Chappy
- Don-chan, a living taiko drum from the video game series Taiko No Tatsujin.
