= Michael Doe =

Michael Doe may refer to:

- Michael Doe (bishop) (born 1947), British bishop
- Michael Doe (businessman) (died 1990), British–Liberian businessman
