= Richard Abrom Henries =

Liberian politician

Richard A. Henries
- Born: Richard Abrom Henries; 16 September 1908; Monrovia, Liberia
- Died: 22 April 1980 (aged 71); Monrovia, Liberia
- Education: College of West Africa, Liberia College
- Occupation: Politician
- Relatives: Angie Brooks (first wife, divorced), A. Doris Banks Henries (second wife)

Richard Abrom Henries (16 September 1908 – 22 April 1980) was a Liberian politician who was speaker of the Liberian House of Representatives.

== Early life ==
Richard Abrom Henries was born in Monrovia, Liberia on 16 September 1908 to George E. Henries, an Americo-Liberian carpenter and merchant, and Eliza B. Henries, née Robinson, a seamstress. Henries was orphaned at age sixteen years old when his parents died in 1924. Henries subsequently lived with his grandmother and two aunts.

== Education ==
Henries graduated at the top of his class from the College of West Africa in 1927. Because he had had a difficult time putting himself through high school, he decided not to go to college. However, his aunt, the late Martha Robinson and her husband, the late Henry A. Clements, encouraged him to enroll at Liberia College and promised to help him with his tuition. Henries enrolled in college, led his class throughout his college years and graduated in 1931 as the valedictorian of his class with a bachelor's degree in mathematics. Henries was subsequently appointed as an associate professor of mathematics a few months after his graduation from Liberia College.

Subsequently, from 1946 to 1951, he served the University of Liberia as secretary of the Board of Trustees and, from 1951 to 1980, as president of the Board. At different times, during the years after his graduation, his alma mater conferred upon him the honorary degrees of Doctor of Laws, Doctor of Civil Laws and Doctor of Humanities.

== Death ==
Henries was one of the thirteen Americo-Liberian political leaders who were executed in the 1980 Liberian coup.

== Personal life ==
Henries was married to Angie Brooks, a Liberian, and subsequently to A. Doris Banks Henries, an African American.
