= Virginia, Liberia =

Town in Montserrado County, Liberia

Virginia
- Town
- Location within Liberia, West Africa
- Coordinates: 6°29′30″N 10°48′4″W
- Country: Liberia
- County: Montserrado County
- Elevation: 253 ft (77 m)
- Time zone: UTC+0 (GMT)

Virginia is a western suburb of Monrovia, located near the Atlantic Ocean on the northern side of the Saint Paul River in Liberia. It was the birthplace of Angie Brooks, the first African female president of the United Nations General Assembly.

A settlement originally called New Virginia, the American Colonization Society used it as a location for African-American immigrants from the United States. It gets its name from the U.S. state of Virginia, where most of the town's settlers originated before emigration to Liberia.

Virginia was also the location of the Organisation of African Unity conference hosted by President William R. Tolbert, Jr. – who was the group's chair at the time – at Hotel Africa in 1979, just months before he was overthrown by Samuel Doe.

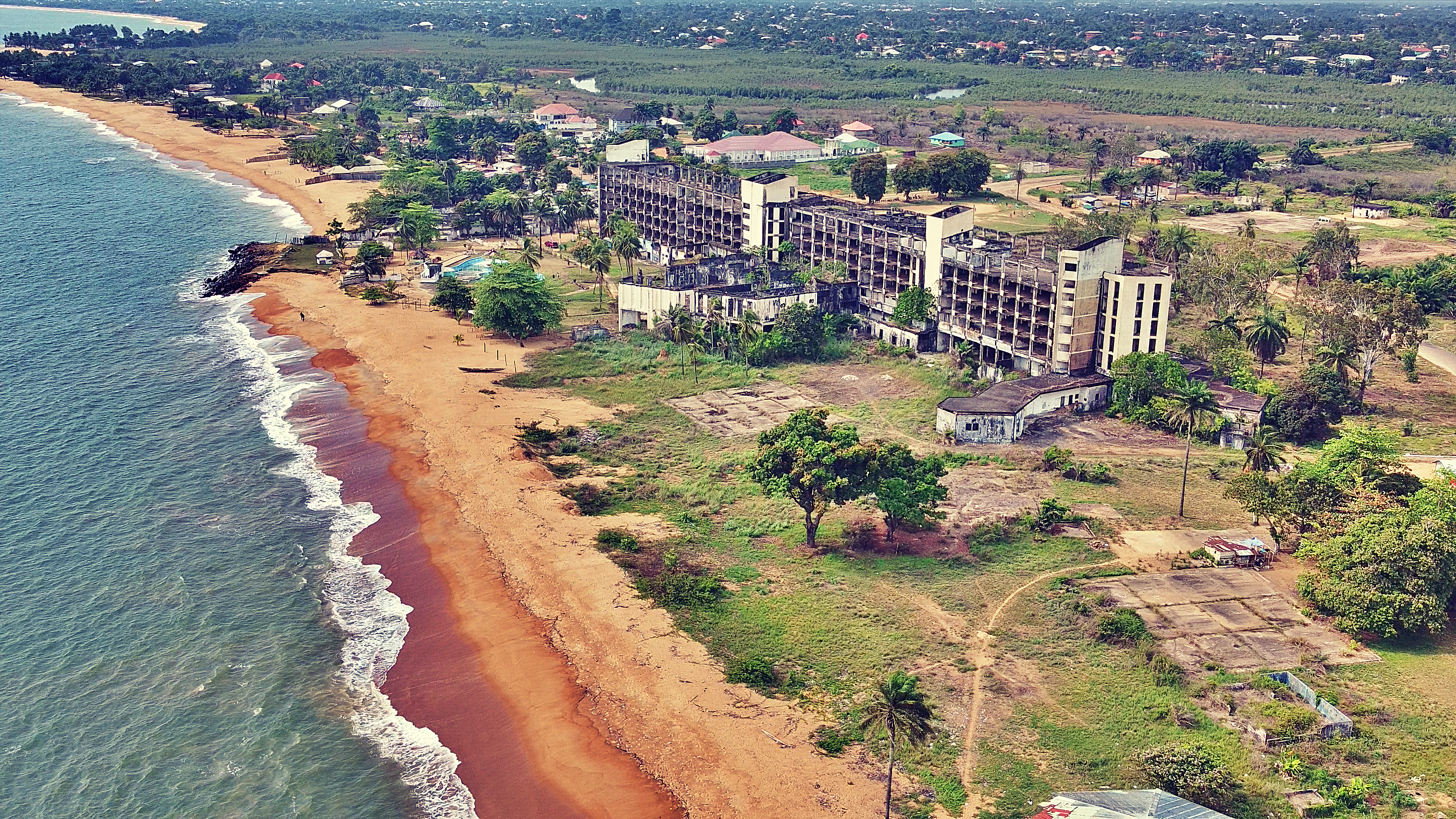
Grounds of Hotel Africa in Liberia

During the Second Liberian Civil War, rebels used Virginia to launch an onslaught on Monrovia in 2003.

A South African consortium plans to invest US$100 million (~$142 million in 2024) to renovate the historic hotel in time for Liberia's hosting duties of an international women's colloquium in 2009. It contains the Seaview Golf Club.
