= Seaview Golf Club =

Golf course in Liberia

Coordinates: 6°23′23″N 10°47′44″W

The Seaview Golf Club is the owner of Liberia's only 18-hole golf course, located opposite the Unity Conference Center and situated on one hundred acres of landscape where the St. Paul River empties into the Atlantic Ocean in Virginia, Montserrado County, Liberia. It is located about 6 miles (10 km) northwest of downtown Monrovia, the capital of the West African Republic of Liberia, near the abandoned Hotel Africa.

The Seaview Golf Course was formally established in June 2004 by the Liberia Golf Association under the Chairmanship of Dr. C Nelson Oniyama.

Another golf course in Liberia is on the premises of the Firestone plantation in Harbel in Margibi County.
