= Angie Brooks =

Liberian diplomat and jurist

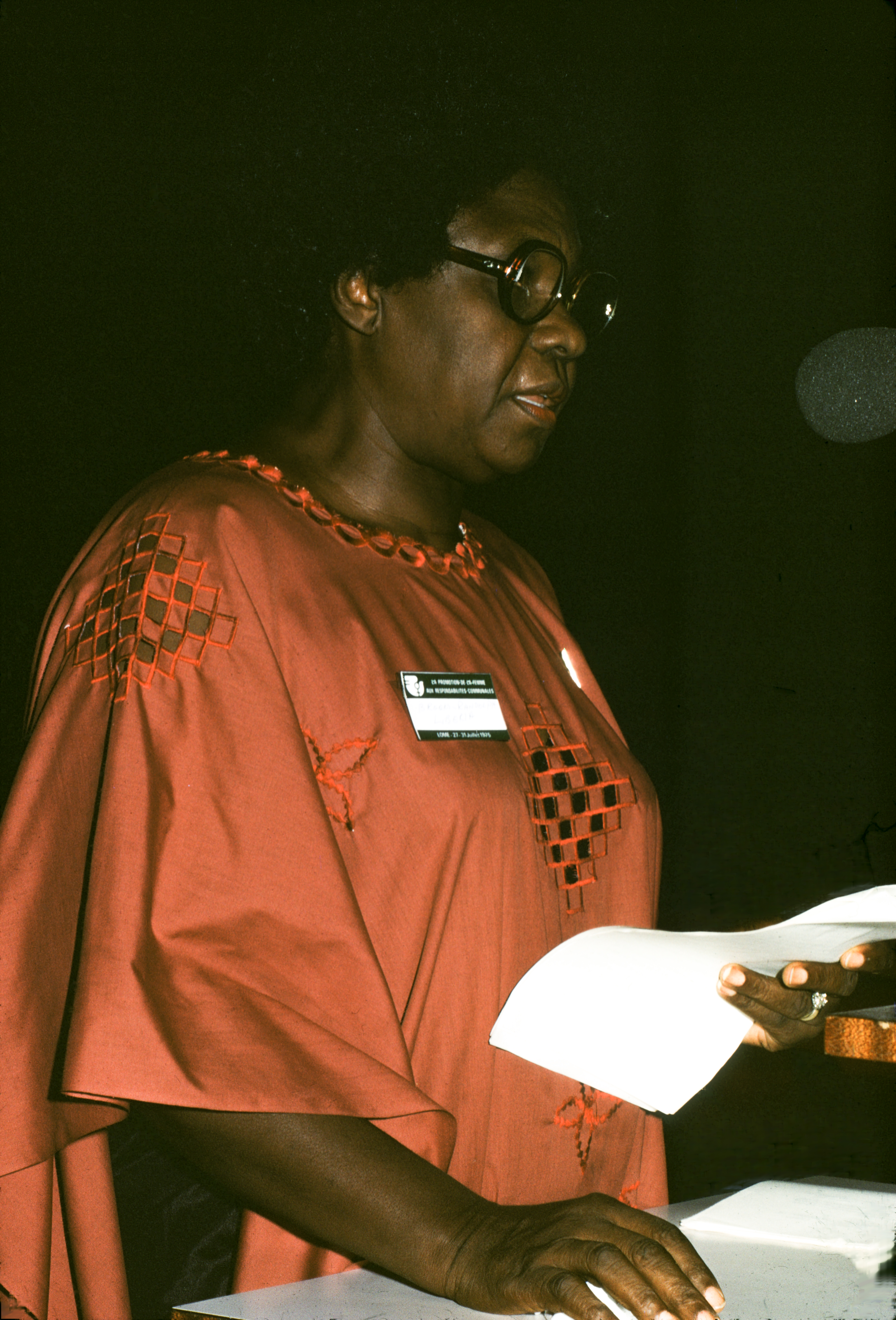
- Brooks in 1975

President of the United Nations General Assembly
- In office 1969–1970
- Preceded by: Emilio Arenales Catalán
- Succeeded by: Edvard Hambro

Personal details
- Born: August 24, 1928 Virginia, Liberia
- Died: September 9, 2007 (aged 79) Houston, Texas, United States
- Profession: Diplomat, jurist

Angie Elizabeth Brooks (August 24, 1928 – September 9, 2007) was a Liberian diplomat and jurist. She was the first African female President of the United Nations General Assembly. Brooks was also the second woman from any nation to head the U.N. body.

In 1969, she was chosen as the President of the General Assembly and took office in 1970. In 1974, she became Liberia's Permanent Representative to the United Nations, where much of her work involved the transformation of former colonial states into independent countries. She also served as Assistant Secretary of State of Liberia. Her tenure as Permanent Representative ended in 1977 when she was appointed an Associate Justice of the Supreme Court of Liberia. Nominated by President Tolbert on 4 May and taking office two days later, she was the first woman to serve on the Supreme Court of Liberia.

== Early life ==
Born of mixed Vai, Grebo, and Mandingo heritage, Brooks was the daughter of Thomas Joseph, an indigent minister of the African Methodist Episcopal Zionist Church, and Theresa Ellen Brooks. Brooks was the second born out of a total of ten children, and her impoverished parents could not afford to keep her and made the difficult decision to foster her to a widowed seamstress in Monrovia, Liberia. At eleven years old, Brooks taught herself to type and earned money copying legal documents to put herself through school. She worked as a stenotypist for the Justice Department to pay for high school. At fourteen she married Counselor Richard A. Henries (who later became Speaker of the Liberian House of Representatives). She had two sons with Henries before attaining a divorce.

Brooks's early experience as a typist and court stenographer instilled in her an interest in law. While working in courtrooms, she learned that many of the laws were flawed, and she was determined to improve the law by going into the legislature. Therefore, despite the enormous prejudice against women lawyers in Liberia at the time, she decided to seek a law degree. In the 1940s, Liberia did not have any law schools to provide training. Instead, Brooks apprenticed under Clarence Simpson prior to taking the bar exam.

Determined to further her education, Brooks successfully applied to Shaw University in Raleigh, North Carolina, United States. As a divorced mother of two, Brooks could not afford to pay for passage to America, so after her acceptance, she appealed to Liberia's president, William V. S. Tubman, for help; he was so impressed by her determination that he arranged payment for her trip. While in North Carolina, Brooks was so outraged by segregation that she refused to ride the bus and instead drove everywhere. In 1963, while an appointed UN Delegate, Brooks visited Raleigh once again to deliver a speech at North Carolina State University. While there, the restaurants she attempted to dine at refused her service because she was black. Even her status as a diplomat could not protect her from the effects of segregation. North Carolina governor Terry Sanford later apologized to Brooks for the incident.

== Education ==
While at Shaw University, Brooks was a member of the Eta Beta Omega international chapter of Alpha Kappa Alpha Black sorority. She partially financed her studies by working as a dishwasher, laundress, library assistant, and nurse's aide. In 1949, she earned a Bachelor of Arts degree in social science from Shaw University. She then went on to receive a Bachelor of Law degree and a Master of Science degree in political science and international relations from the University of Wisconsin–Madison. She also did graduate work in international law at the University College's Faculty of Laws at the University of London in 1952 and 1953, and she obtained a Doctor of Civil Law degree from the University of Liberia in 1964. Additionally, Brooks earned Doctor of Law degrees from Shaw University and Howard University in 1962 and 1967 respectively.

== Career ==
Brooks returned to Liberia where she served as Counsellor-at-law to the Supreme Court of Liberia. She was the first woman to serve as the Assistant Attorney-General of Liberia from August 1953 to March 1958. She also founded a Department of Law at the University of Liberia to ensure that other Liberians would be able to earn law degrees without having to leave their country. From 1954 to 1958, she served as a part-time Professor of Law at the University of Liberia.

Brooks trained as a diplomat with the United States Foreign Service, a skill she put to good use when, in 1954, she was asked to fill a last-minute vacancy in the Liberian delegation to the United Nations. While Brooks became a delegate almost by happenstance, she served as Liberia's permanent representative to the United Nations every year thereafter until being elected President of the UN General Assembly in 1969. Brooks was cognizant of the gulf between the UN's stated commitments to change and the actions that would make those commitments reality. She made it her personal mission to transform the United Nations into an institution capable of meeting the problems of the world head-on by cutting down on bloviating debate and focusing on substantive deliberation that addressed real issues in a meaningful way. In her first speech after being elected president of the General Assembly, Brooks stated:

We have sometimes failed to realize that neither oratory nor agreements between delegations, nor even resolutions or recommendations have had much impact on the course of affairs in the world at large. The sense of satisfaction, upon adoption of a resolution … has helped to perpetuate the mythology of achievement, so that many of us tend to go happily from one agenda item to the next without seriously considering the possibility or even probability that the resolution adopted will not be implemented. We have lacked and we do lack in this respect a sense of reality.

Brooks was especially concerned with the welfare of newly independent nations that had previously been administered as colonies or UN mandates. In her first interview after being elected as President of the United Nations General Assembly, Brooks urged small nations to find common ground to unite them into a more powerful voice in order to push back and make themselves heard against the world's superpowers.

She also expressed concern over the welfare and legal rights of women, arguing that they must have more of a voice in the political decisions of their nations in order to prevent warfare. In response to a reporter's question about the role of women as representatives, she stated, “If the men would give an opportunity to the women to be heard and would consider wisely some of the things that they are saying, perhaps the world would be in a better condition.”

Her fellow UN members described Brooks as "tough, resilient, patient, and unfailingly good-humored."

In 1958, President William Tubman appointed Brooks Assistant Secretary of State. Brooks wanted the law to be an attainable profession for women, free from discrimination. To that end, from 1956 to 1959 she served as the vice president of the International Federation of Women Lawyers where she worked to advance women's rights and encourage women in the field of law. In 1977, she was appointed Associate Justice of the Supreme Court of Liberia, the first woman to be so appointed. She served in this capacity until a coup d'état in 1980.

Brooks had an intense interest in traditional African art and amassed an extensive collection which was eventually turned into a museum in Liberia.

=== UN Appointments ===
- 1956 vice-chair of the General Assembly Fourth Committee
- 1961 Chair of the UN committee on information from non-self-governing territories (colonies of European powers)
- 1962 Chair of UN commission for Ruanda-Urundi, a commission dedicated to overseeing the division of the former Belgian colony into the separate states of Rwanda and Burundi
- 1964 Chair of UN mission to the trust territory of the Pacific Islands
- 1965 Vice president of the Trusteeship Council, an organization whose goal was to supervise the transition from colony to sovereign territory
- 1966 President of the Trusteeship Council
- 1969 President of the UN General Assembly
- 1975 Permanent Representative of Liberia to the UN.

== Family ==
Angie Brooks had two biological sons, Richard A. Henries II and Wynston Henries from her first marriage to Richard A. Henries I. In addition, she was also a foster mother to daughters Marjorie and Eda. In total, Brooks fostered at least 47 Liberian children in honor of her own foster mother; many of them were raised on her rubber plantation in Wearleah. In addition, Brooks adopted a daughter, Aida, who had been orphaned during the war in Rwanda. Very interested in children's education, she donated large sums to projects devoted to this cause.

After her divorce from Richard A. Henries I, she later married Isaac M Randolph.

Despite her intention to return to Liberia to live out her last days, she died on September 9, 2007, in Houston, Texas, United States. Brooks received a state funeral in Liberia and was buried in her birthplace of Virginia in Montserrado County.

== See also ==
- First women lawyers around the world

Diplomatic posts
Preceded by Emilio Arenales Catalan	President of the United Nations General Assembly; 1969	Succeeded by Edvard Hambro
