= Ban Pako =

- Location within Laos

General information
- Location: Laos
- Coordinates: 18°9′32″N 102°51′30″E

Other information
- Number of rooms: 22

Ban Pako, also known as Ban Pako Eco Resort, is an ecotourist resort lodge and ancient site along the Nam Ngum River, approximately 50 kilometres northeast of Vientiane, Laos. The area is a major archaeological significance with the remains on an ancient temple which has been excavated and revealed evidence of ancient metal working and textile making in the area and that the inhabitants had advanced skills in pottery. The resort has 22 rooms and the buildings are low and made traditionally with thatched roofs.
