= Gallery Park Hotel, Riga =

Hotel in Riga, Latvia

Coordinates: 56.9554°N 24.1097°E

Gallery Park Hotel & SPA

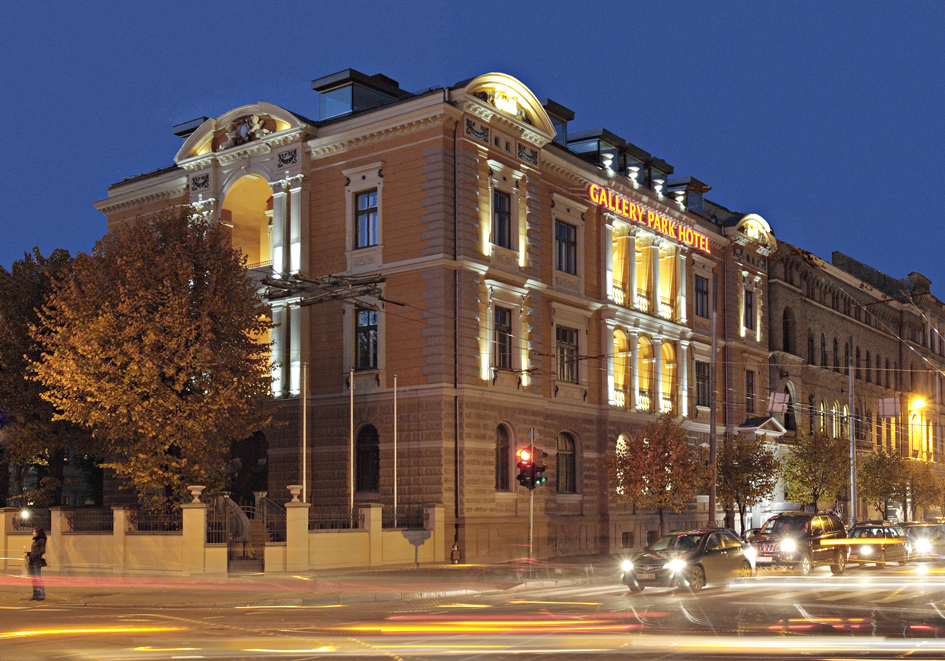
- Interactive map of the Gallery Park Hotel & SPA area

General information
- Location: Riga, Latvia, 7, Kr.Valdemara Street, Riga, LV 1010
- Opening: 2009

Other information
- Number of rooms: 23

Website
- galleryparkhotel.com

Gallery Park Hotel & SPA is a 5 star hotel in Riga, Latvia, Gallery Park Hotel & SPA was established in 2009 after the grand restoration and has been already awarded the Best Hotel in Latvia and is located in the heart of Riga in a 19th-century building that is on the list of the World Heritage sites by UNESCO.

== History ==
The building where Gallery Park Hotel & SPA is located dates to 1875. At that time, merchant Johan Joachim Fenger ordered the architect M. Holst to design a mansion in the neo-classical style for his family. A year later the merchant hired R. Pflug, who designed the sun-lounge, banister and stables. In 1892 another then-recognised architect - K. Felsko - added a portal with caryatides to the completed house.

Later the building belonged to the family of Wilhelm Leopold Hartmann and his wife Johanna Maria (née Fenger). Wilhelm Hartmann was the founder and owner of the W.Hartmann factory which produced butter (21-23 Veca Jelgavas Street). Together with the building, Johanna Maria inherited from her father a big carriage, which had earlier belonged to her grandmother. The interior of the carriage was completed in dark green silk. In this four-horse carriage, Johanna Maria travelled to and from Paris. The carriage is currently an exhibit at the Latvian Open-air Museum.

Until 1940 this building was the headquarters of the Fricis Grauds shipping company, the largest in Latvia. After the war the building, which was located opposite a park area, became the property of the Soviet Army and housed the Political Department of the Baltic Military Region.

== Interior ==
Today the hotel rather resembles a museum. The walls of the lounge are decorated with gold embossed leather, which was handmade in Paris by the company Tassin using bronze stencils and 1901 equipment.

The original woodwork on the walls and ceiling of the lounge and reception has been retained, and has been professionally restored.

The reception has assembled carved oak furniture finished with green leather, which was manufactured at the end of the 19th century by the renowned Russian Schmidt workshop, which was granted the title of His Imperial Majesty's supplier.

There are also two metre high floor-mounted lanterns, cast in France more than a hundred years ago, and painted the colour of the Alexander III bridge in Paris.

The wine room on the ground floor has a set of doors acquired at an auction in France, where it was delivered from a chateau built, like the Riga building, in 1875.

The wine room's unique decorated floor is the only retained example of the floors so characteristic of 19th century Riga. It is worth drawing attention to the cheval-glass and piano of the first half of the 19th century. In most of the rooms, the style of Napoleon III, restored by European designers, is dominant. Even the Persian carpets in the reception, lounge and guest rooms are more than a century old!

To decorate the spa centre of the hotel, created according to the design of Italian architect Gianluigi Landoni, mosaic tiles and Italian natural stone were used. The hall is decorated with a mosaic panel picture by Bisazza.

== Facade ==
The façade of the building is neo-classical style, with balconies facing three sides: Kr. Valdemara Street (the Museum and Academy of Arts), Kalpaka Boulevard (Kronvalda park) and the hotel's yard with a garden.

In 1892 the building had a portal with caryatides attached on the side of Kr. Valdemara Street.

Bas-reliefs of horse heads have been retained on the former stable building. Underneath it today is underground parking with a car lift.

Previously a cartouche on the side of Kalpaka Boulevard which is held by two Cupids had the letter “F”, which represented the initial letter of the building owners – Fenger. Today the cartouche is decorated with the letter “E”, which must have some relation to the current owners of the hotel.
