= Galleria Hotel Beirut =

Hotel in Beirut, Lebanon

Coordinates: 33.866407°N 35.485598°E

The Galleria Hotel Beirut is a five-star hotel in Beirut, Lebanon. It is located to the north-west of the city and has 162 rooms and 12 suites on 11 floors. The hotel has a number of restaurants including the Atrium Cafe, Champions Sports Bar & Restaurant which is an American-style sports bar, the Palms Brasserie which serves expensive French cuisine, and Waves Pool Bar & Grill, known for its weekend barbecues and buffets.

The hotel opened in June 1996 as the Beirut Marriott Hotel. The hotel closed in 2007 and reopened in 2008 as the Galleria Hotel Beirut. In 2012, it was renamed the Golden Tulip Galleria Hotel In January 2020, the hotel's management contract with Golden Tulip Hotels ended and it again became the Galleria Hotel Beirut.

== External links and references ==
- Galleria Hotel Beirut official website
