= Hotel Africa =

Hotel in Liberia

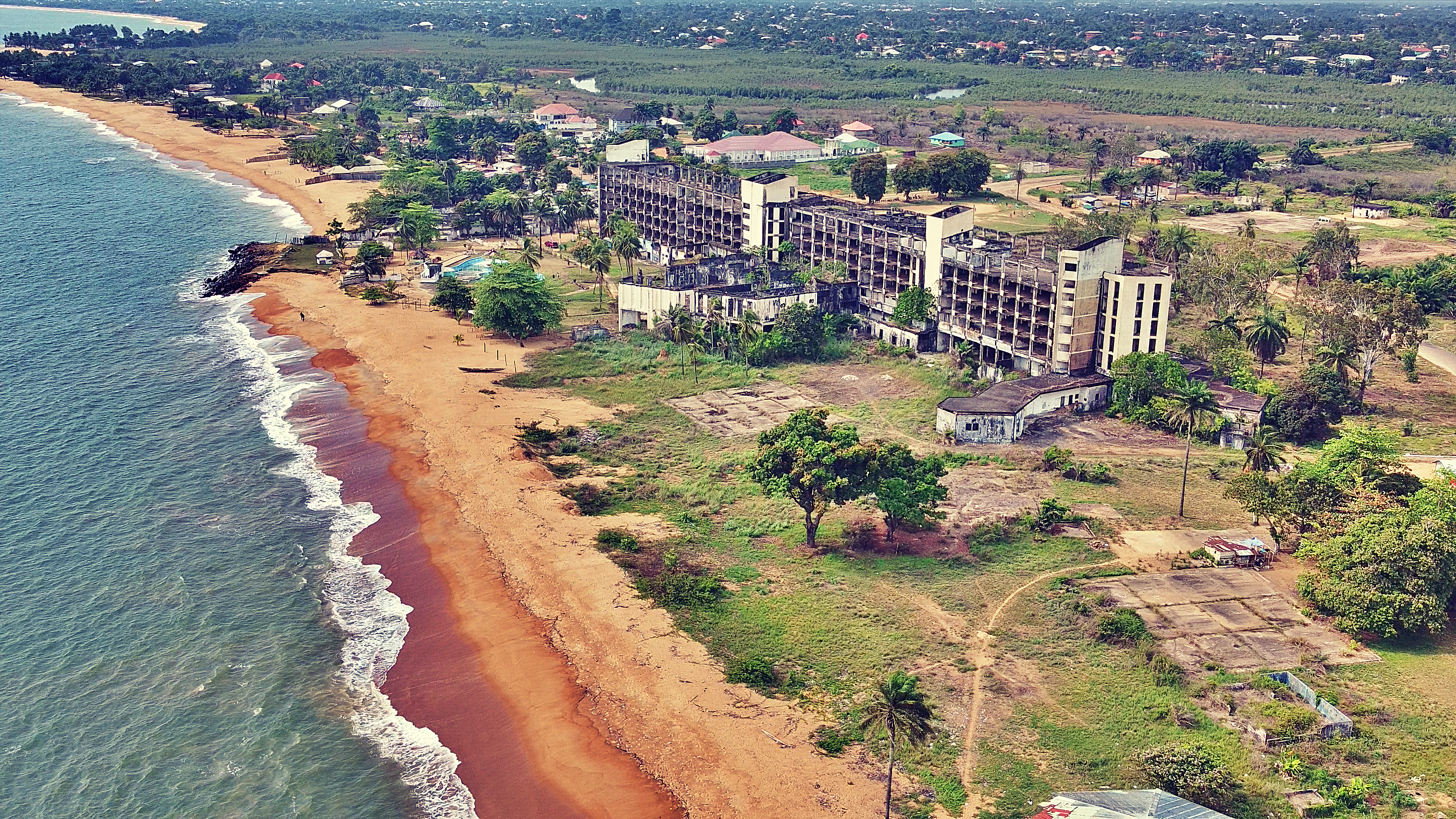
- Hotel Africa (2025)

- Location within Liberia

General information
- Location: Virginia, Greater Monrovia District, Liberia
- Coordinates: 6°24′9″N 10°48′39″W

Hotel Africa was a hotel on the western coast of Liberia in the northern Monrovia suburb of Virginia.

In 1979, the hotel, the largest in Liberia, hosted the Organisation of African Unity conference. The conference was led by President William R. Tolbert, Jr. who was the group's chair at the time, just months before he was overthrown by Samuel Doe. During the Liberian Civil War, many pilots of Russian and Ukrainian origin stayed at the hotel. In the 1980s, the hotel was owned by British-Liberian businessman Michael Doe. On 5 August 1990, the INPFL kidnapped the manager Doe, two Lebanese, and two Liberians at the Hotel Africa, later murdering Michael Doe, throwing him off the 4th floor balcony.

A South African consortium had plans to invest US$100 million to renovate the historic hotel in time for Liberia's hosting duties of an international women's colloquium in 2009.

In May 2025, the Government of Liberia declared that it's moving forward to reclaim and redevelop the property. In a post on Facebook on October 9th, 2025, the Ministry of Public Works of the Republic of Liberia announced the imminent eviction of Hotel Africa's squatters.
