= Lao Plaza Hotel =

- Location in Laos

General information
- Location: 63 Samsenthai Road Vientiane, Laos
- Coordinates: 17°57′59″N 102°36′30″E
- Opening: September 1997

Height
- Height: 46 m (151 ft)

Technical details
- Floor count: 7

Design and construction
- Developer: Thailand

Other information
- Number of rooms: 142
- Parking: Free

Lao Plaza Hotel is a hotel at 63 Samsenthai Road, Vientiane, Laos, located next to the Lao National Museum. It build itself as the first 5-star hotel in Laos. The rooms of the hotel are described by Frommers as "bland" and decorated in beige and blue. The hotel has 142 rooms and there are 3 restaurants.
