= Michael Doe (businessman) =

Michael Doe (died 5 August 1990) was a British-Liberian businessman. He was the owner of the Hotel Africa and was murdered on 5 August 1990 by Independent National Patriotic Front of Liberia (INPFL) Field Marshal Prince Johnson and thrown off the balcony of the 4th floor of the hotel.
