= Settha Palace Hotel =

- Location in Laos

General information
- Location: 6 Pangkham Street, Vientiane, Laos
- Coordinates: 17°58′7″N 102°36′35″E
- Opening: 1999

Other information
- Number of rooms: 26
- Number of suites: 2 (Executive)

Settha Palace Hotel is a historical boutique hotel located at 6 Pangkham Street, Vientiane, central Laos, next to Laos National Stadium, near the Khounboulom Boulevard. It is housed in a renovated French Indonese colonial building built in 1932. The hotel was reopened after substantial renovation in 1999.

== Architecture ==
The hotel is restored to its 1930s colonial appearance. The building is painted beige with mahogany brown windows. At the front of the hotel are beige painted pilasters leading into the reception. The lobby is similarly painted in beige/cream with a grand chandelier on the ceiling, a light brown marble floor with two large pilasters supporting the roof towards the end in front of the staircase. Wooden chairs with orange pattern furnishings lie on either side of the lobby. The banisters of the staircase, like most of the hotel. are dark rosewood. The swimming pool and hotel is surrounded by palm trees.

== Meetings and banquets ==
The hotel has an elegant banquet room facing the pool garden, which is able to host up to 200 persons.

== La Belle Epoque ==
The hotel is served by La Belle Epoque Restaurant, which serves French and continental cuisine.
