= Amantaka =

Resort hotel in Luang Prabang, Laos

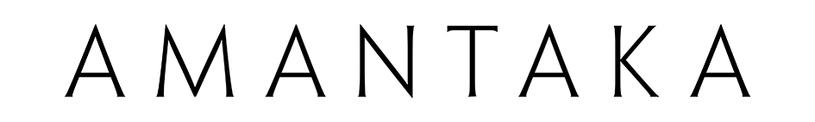

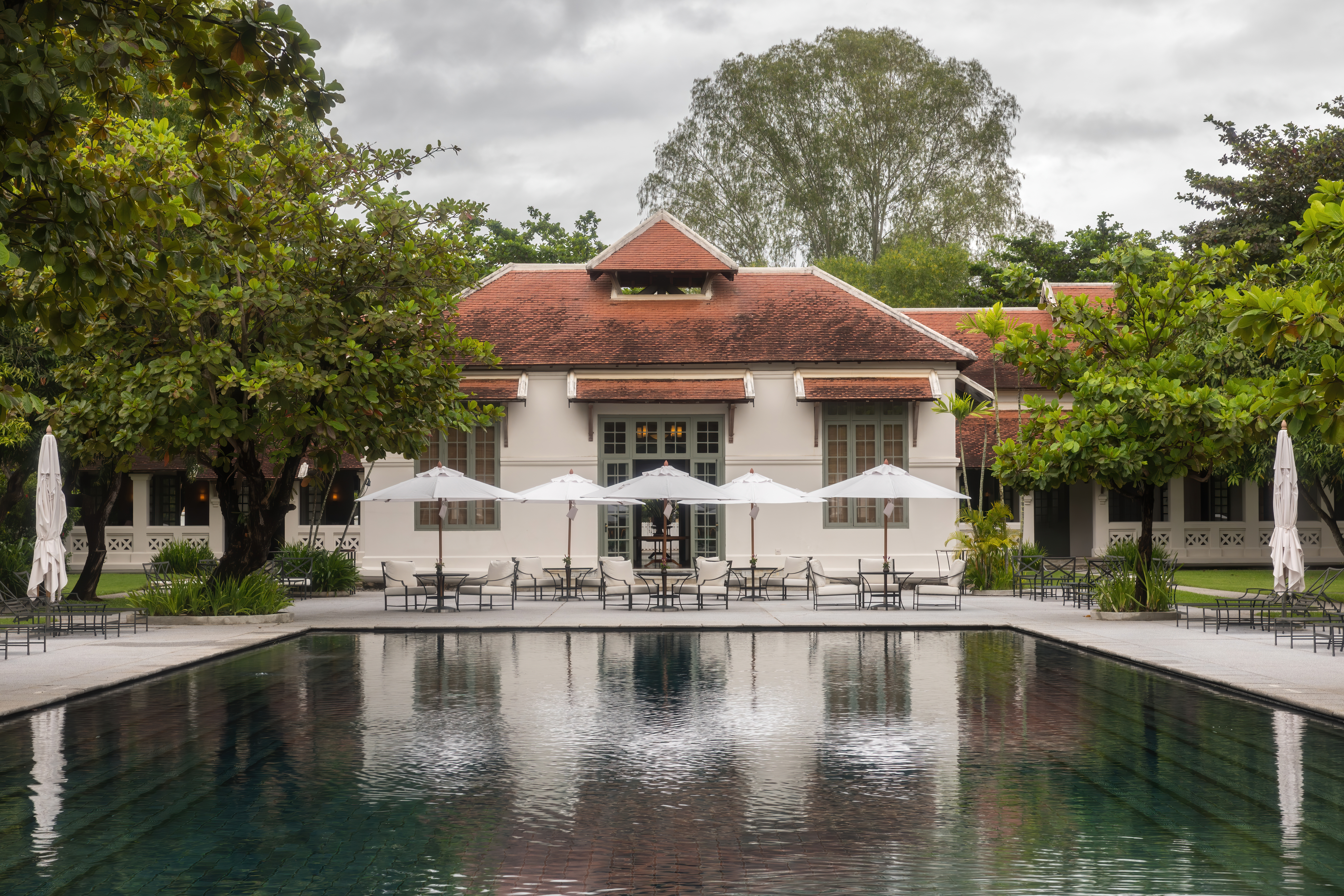

- Location within Laos

General information
- Location: 55/3 Kingkitsarath Road, Ban Thongchaleun, Luang Prabang, Laos
- Coordinates: 19°53′34″N 102°8′21″E
- Opening: September 2009
- Owner: Aman Resorts
- Management: Tshewang Norbu (General Manager)

Other information
- Number of rooms: 24

Amantaka is a luxury hotel in Luang Prabang, Laos. The hotel, located in a French colonial building, is operated by Aman Resorts and opened in September 2009. The hotel is located in the northwestern part of the city in the old town area, several metres from the Mekong River and approximately 400 metres northeast of the Royal Palace. The hotel encourages the education of the guests in traditional Lao culture and hires such cultural advisers to teach the guests on a regular basis in traditional Lao customs and practices. Originally completed in 1923 as the Viceroy family residence of Prince Boun Khong, Amantaka’s Aman Villa is situated in close proximity to Amantaka, allowing guests easy access to all the resort’s facilities.

== History ==
The opening ceremony in September 2009 was attended by several important Laotian government officials, including the Minister of Information and Culture (Mounkeo Oraboun), Minister to the President's Office (Soubanh Srithirath), Minister to the Prime Minister's Office (Cheuang Sombounkhanh), the president of the Aman Resorts group and various senior officials and businessmen. The building dates to the French colonial period in the early twentieth century. The building was bought by Aman Resorts and was managed by an Australian, Gary Tyson, who served as General Manager from 2009 - October 2015.

The current General Manager since September 2022 is Tshewang Norbu, after Donald Wong and Livio Ranza. Growing up in Bhutan, also a Buddhist country, Tshewang Norbu started working for Aman in 2001 at Amanusa (Indonesia), then Amandari, Amankila, and Amankora (Bhutan), before integrating Amantaka.

In 2010 the hotel was featured by the American luxury travel magazine, Condé Nast Traveler on both their Asian and Asian and Australasian "Hot List"s.

== Architecture ==
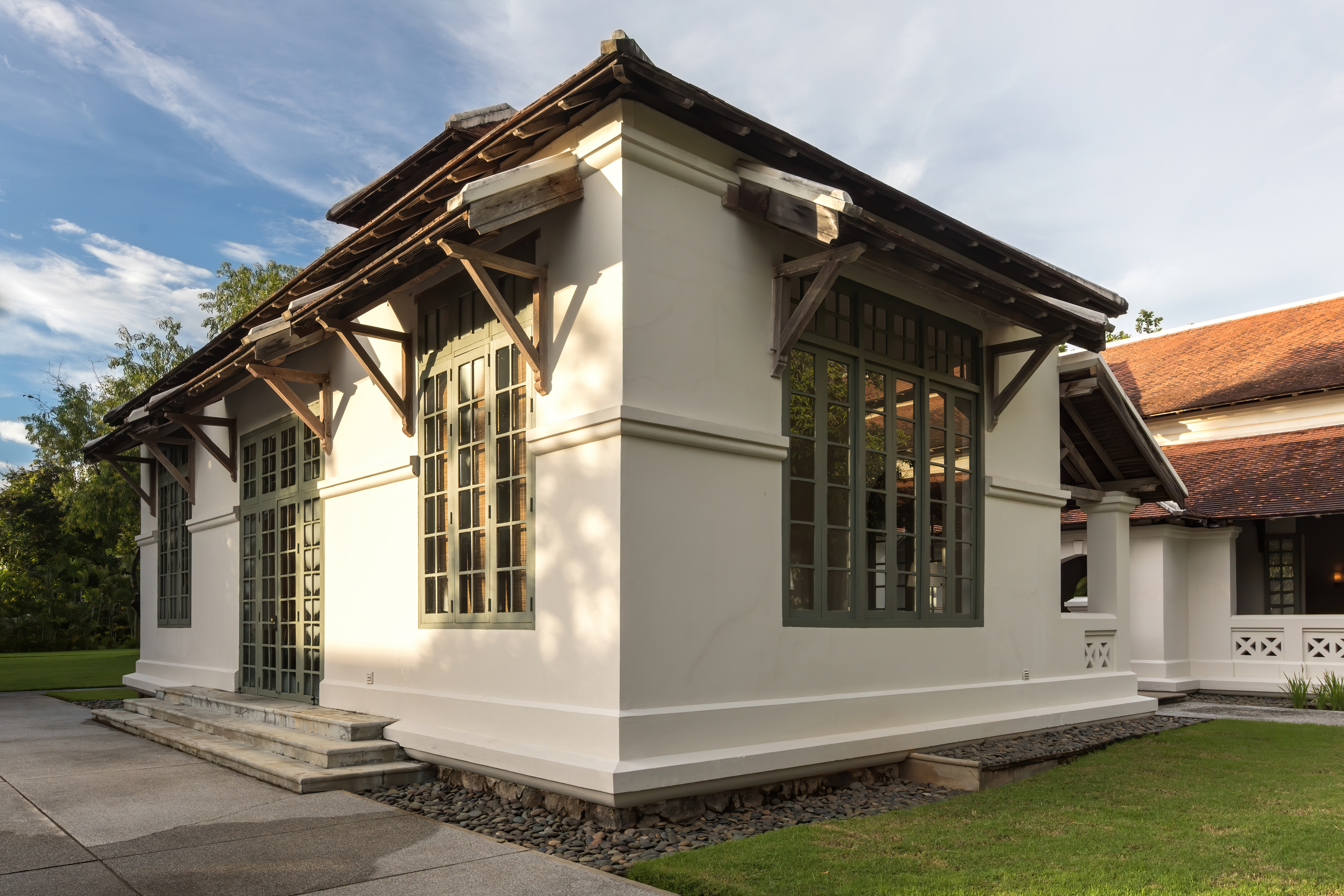
Library of the resort.

The hotel is located in a French Indochinese colonial building, constructed between 1901 and 1910, characterised by its low height and extensive width, containing many pilasters to support the roof. It is set in gardens and is painted in white with a red-orange roof. The hotel name, Amantaka, is derived from the Sanskrit word aman meaning "peace" and the word taka, meaning "teacher of the Buddha".

=== Suites ===
A boutique hotel, it contains 24 lavish suites, encircling a central courtyard and is designed with a mixture of traditional Lao furnishings and modern. The suites range in size from 70 to 120 square metres and include eight suites, four pool suites, eight Khan pool suites, two Mekong pool suites and two Amantaka pool suites. The suites are accessed through louvered doors from the courtyard. All of the rooms have a king-sized bed centre of the suites beneath a traditional high ceiling. The rooms are painted in white and have mahogany or dark wood furnishings and windows. The rooms are reported to be between US$1,100 and US$1,900 a night in 2023, the most expensive being the Amantaka pool suites ($1,900) followed by the Mekong pool suites ($1,700).

The hotel encourages the education of the guests in traditional Lao culture and hires such cultural advisers to teach the guests on a regular basis in traditional Lao customs and practices.

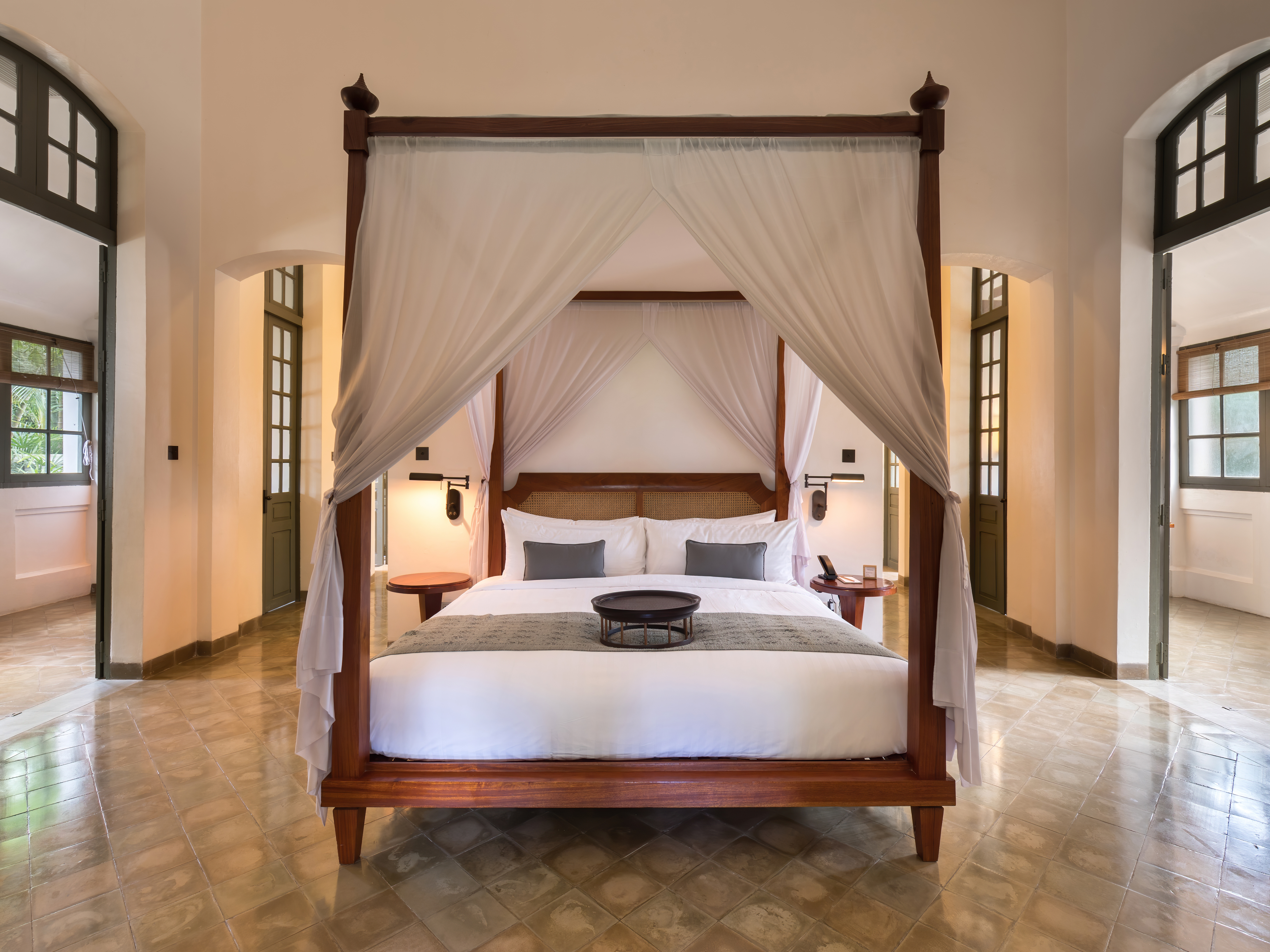
Canopy bed of Amantaka Suite.

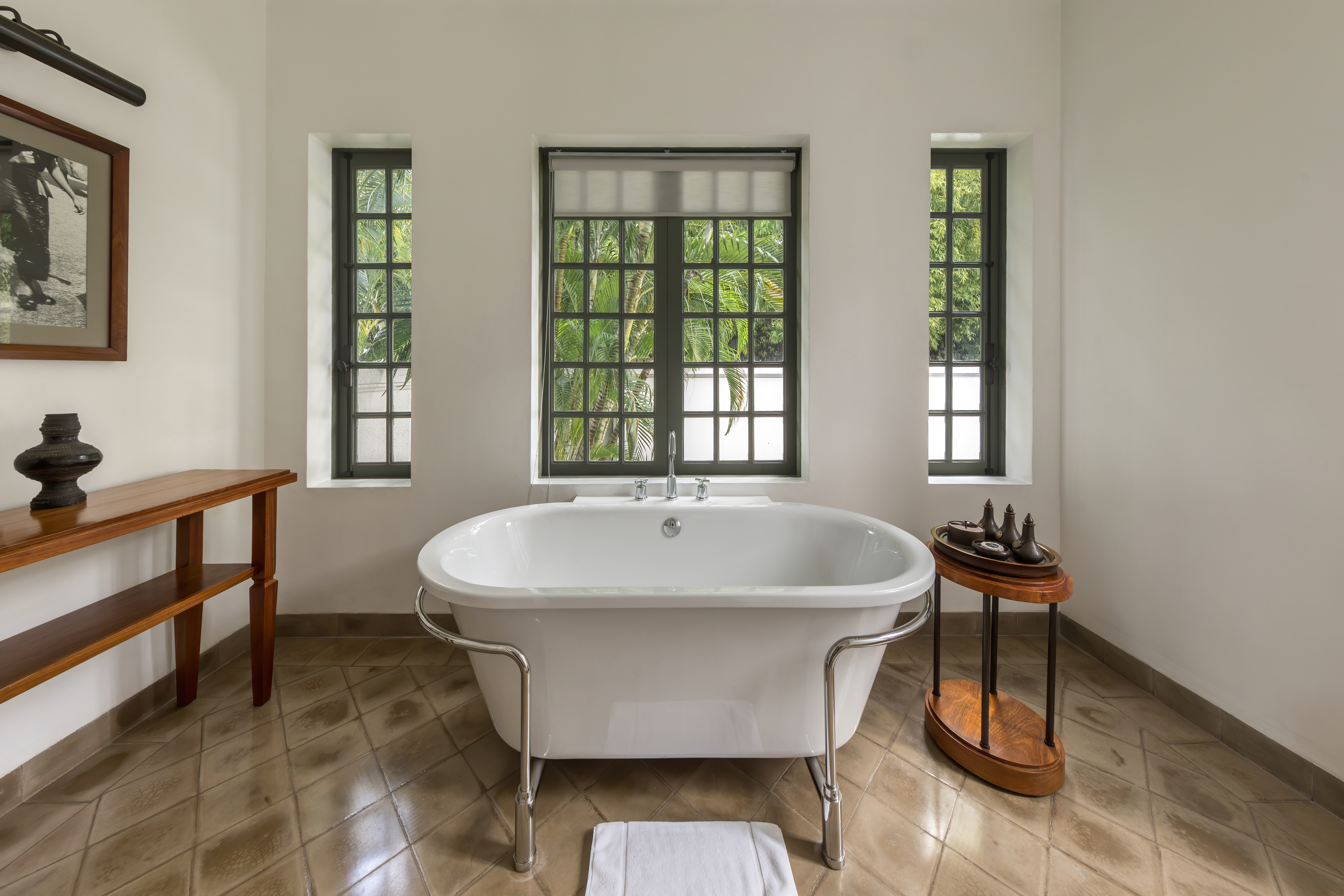
Bathtub of Khan Pool Suite.

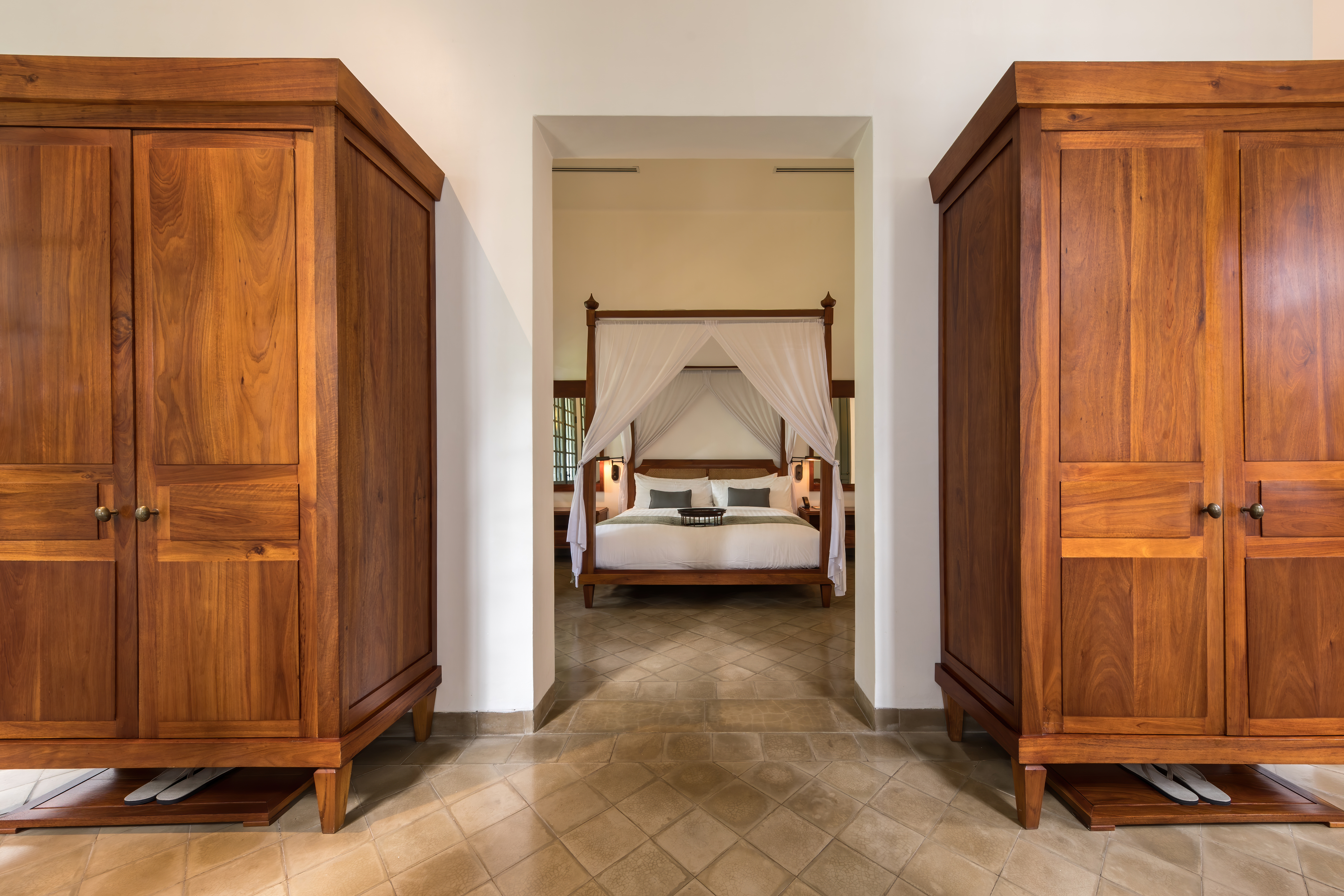
Canopy bed and wardrobes in Khan Pool Suite.

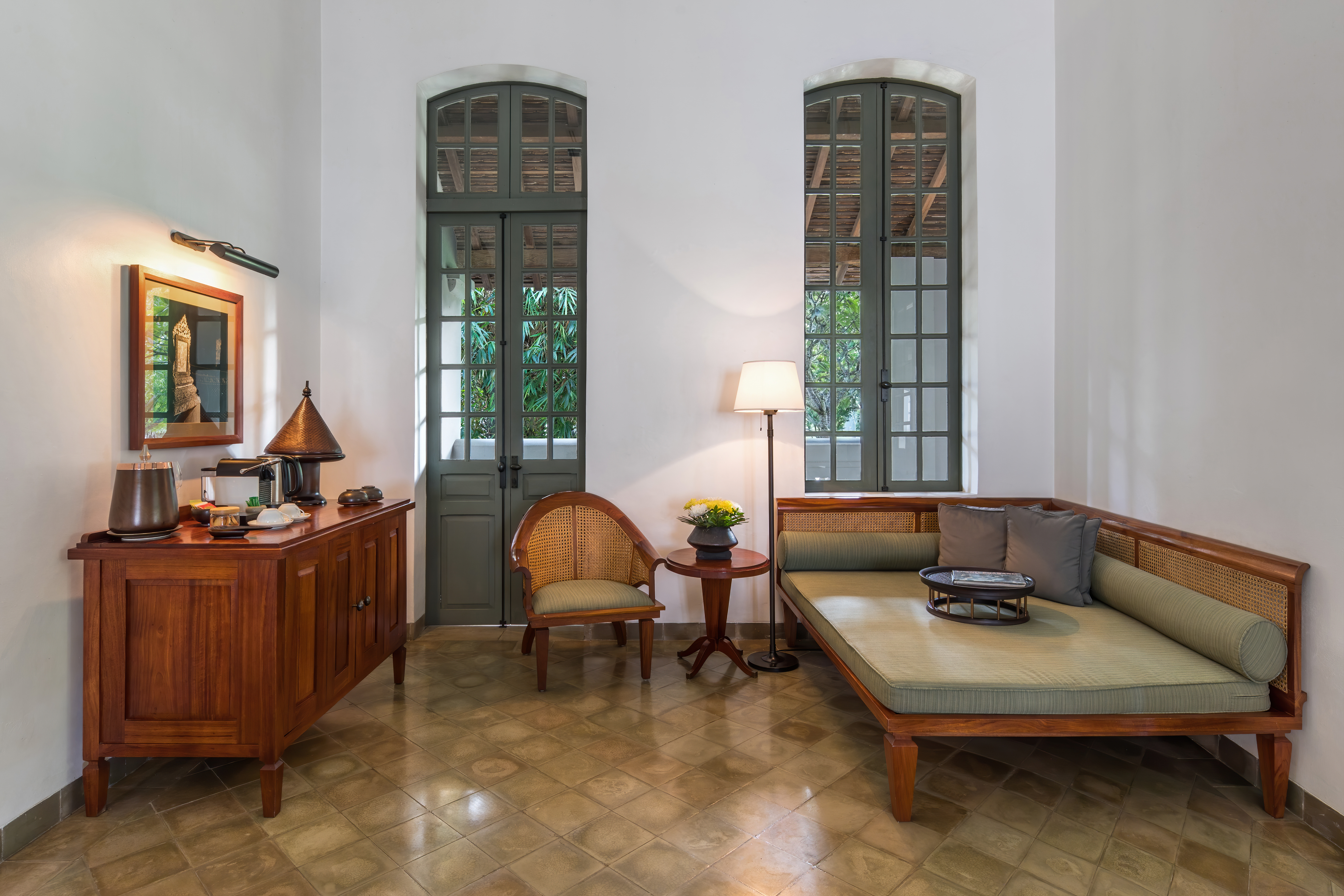
Lobby lounge of Amantaka Suite with armchair and couch, wooden furniture and coffee machine.

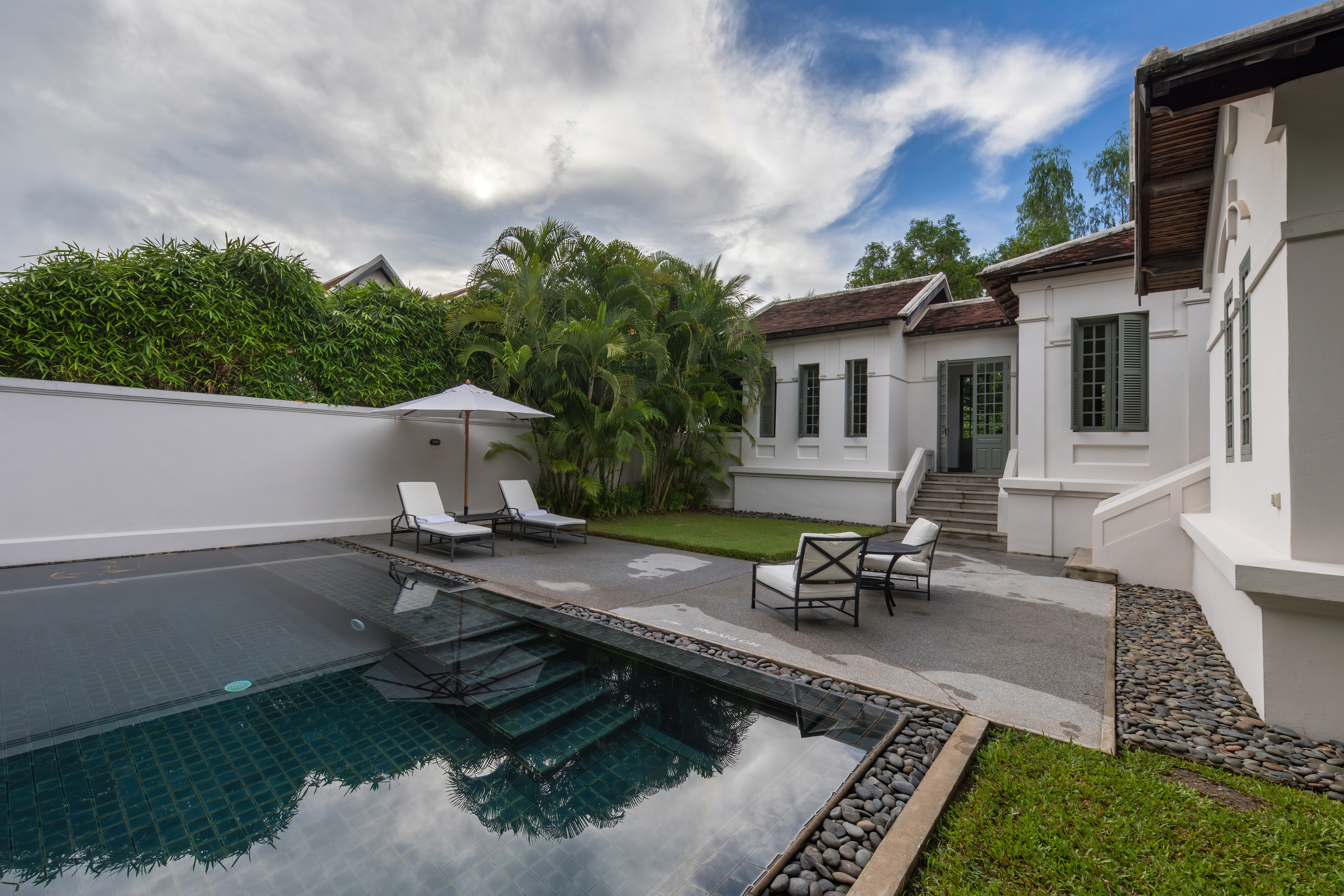
Swimming pool of Khan Pool Suite.

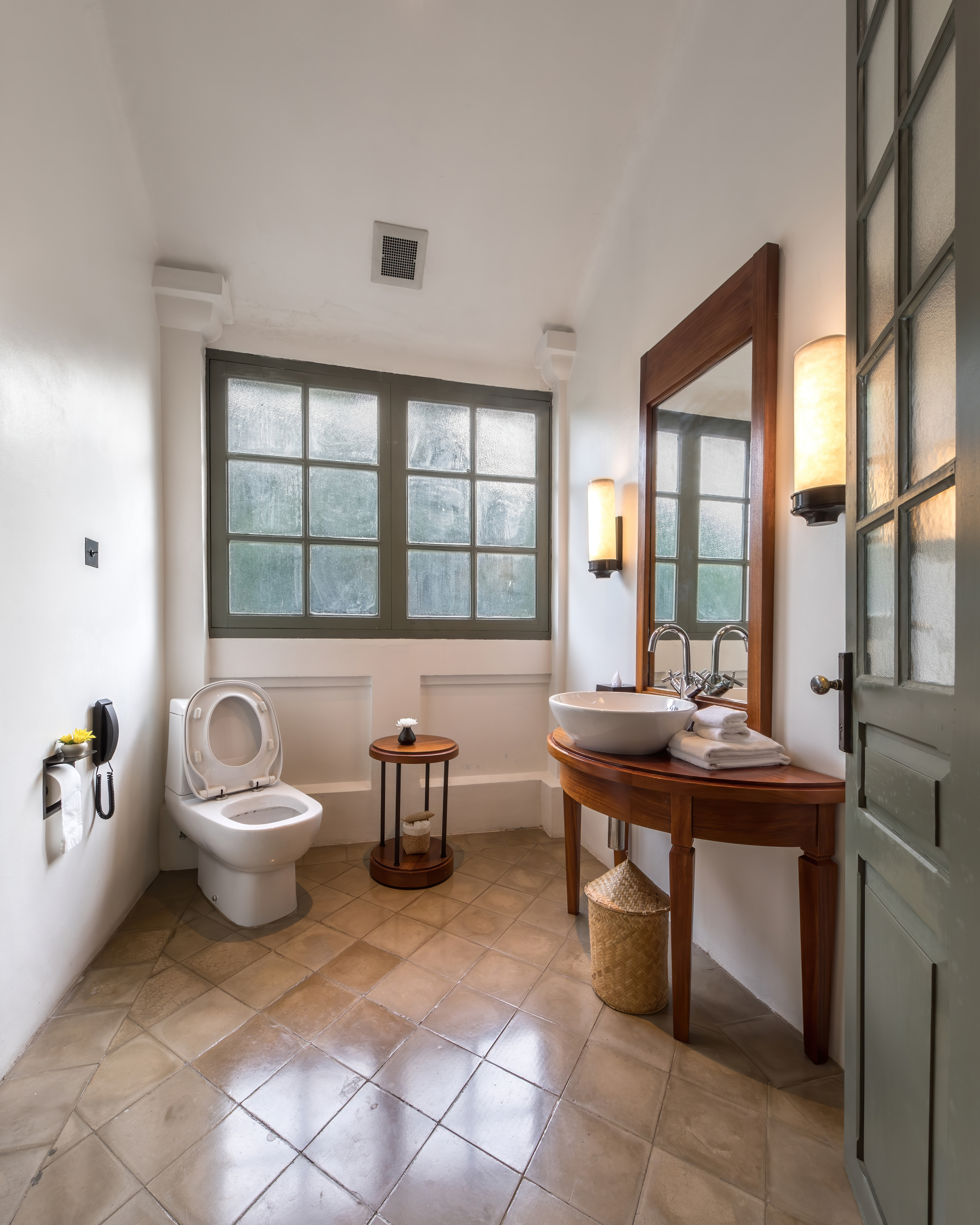
Toilets with wall telephone in Amantaka Suite.

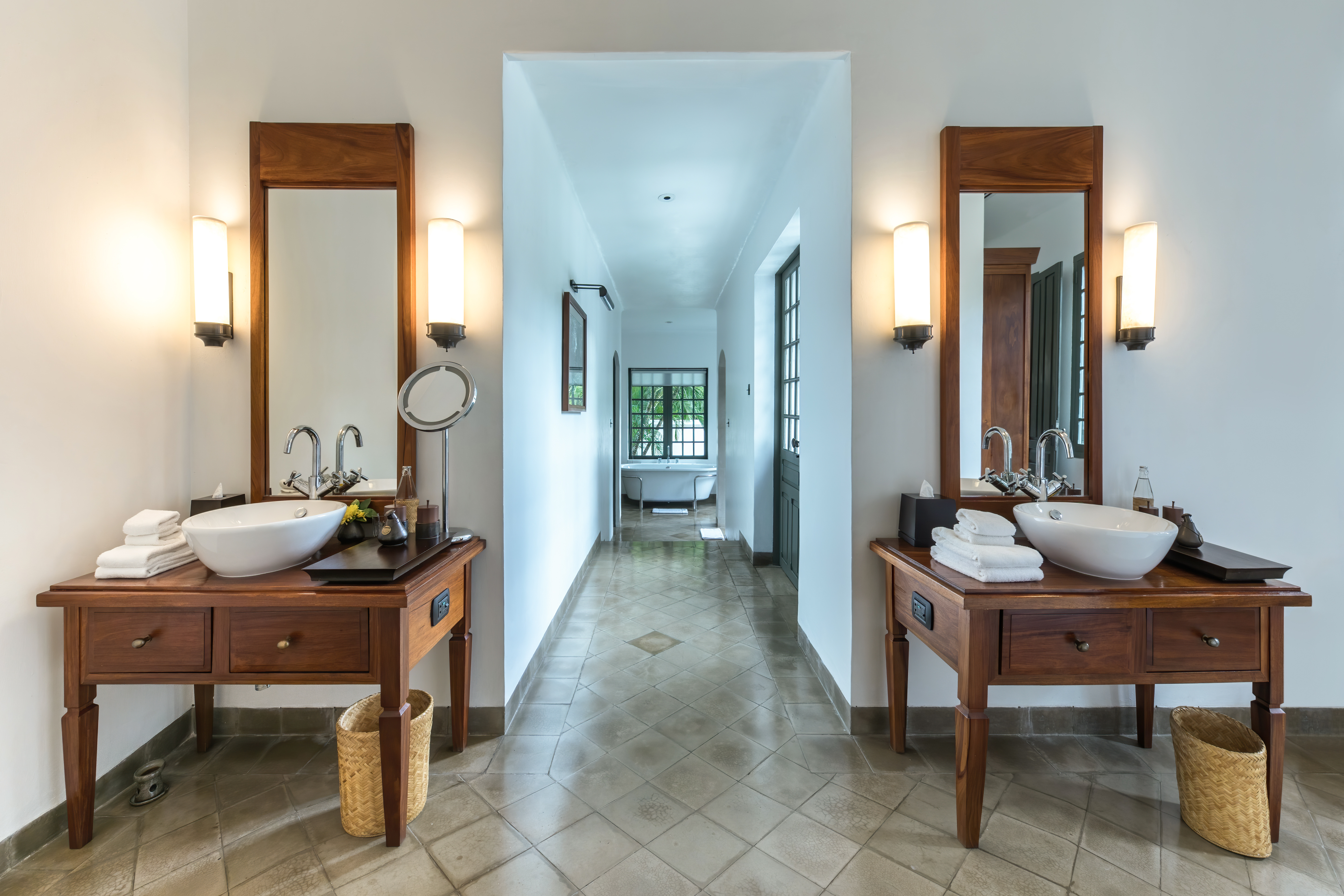
Symmetry impression in the bathroom of Khan Pool Suite.

== Spa ==
The resort includes a spa with massage parlor, indoor pool, and sauna.

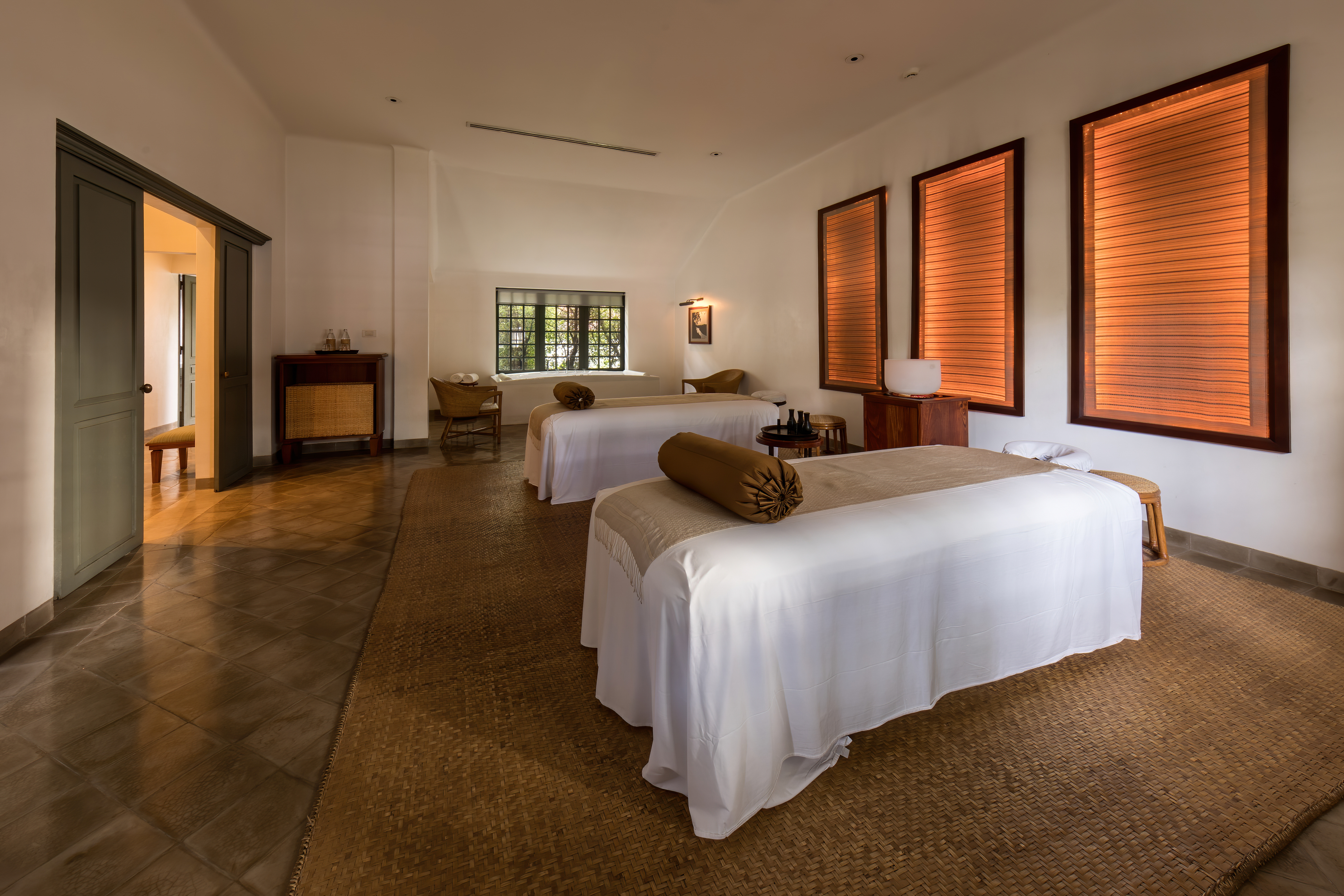
Massage parlor in the spa.

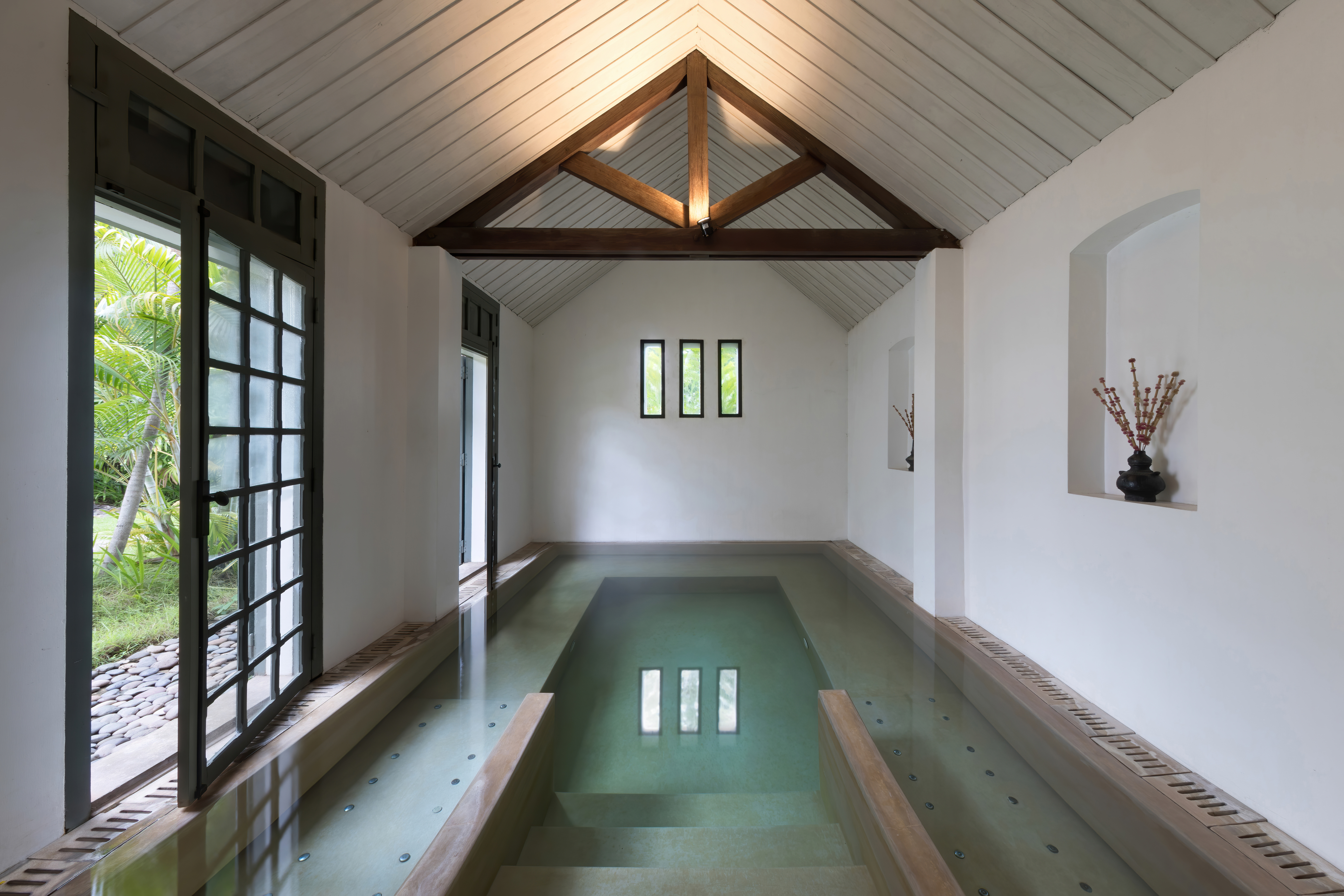
Indoor pool of the spa with open door leading to the garden.

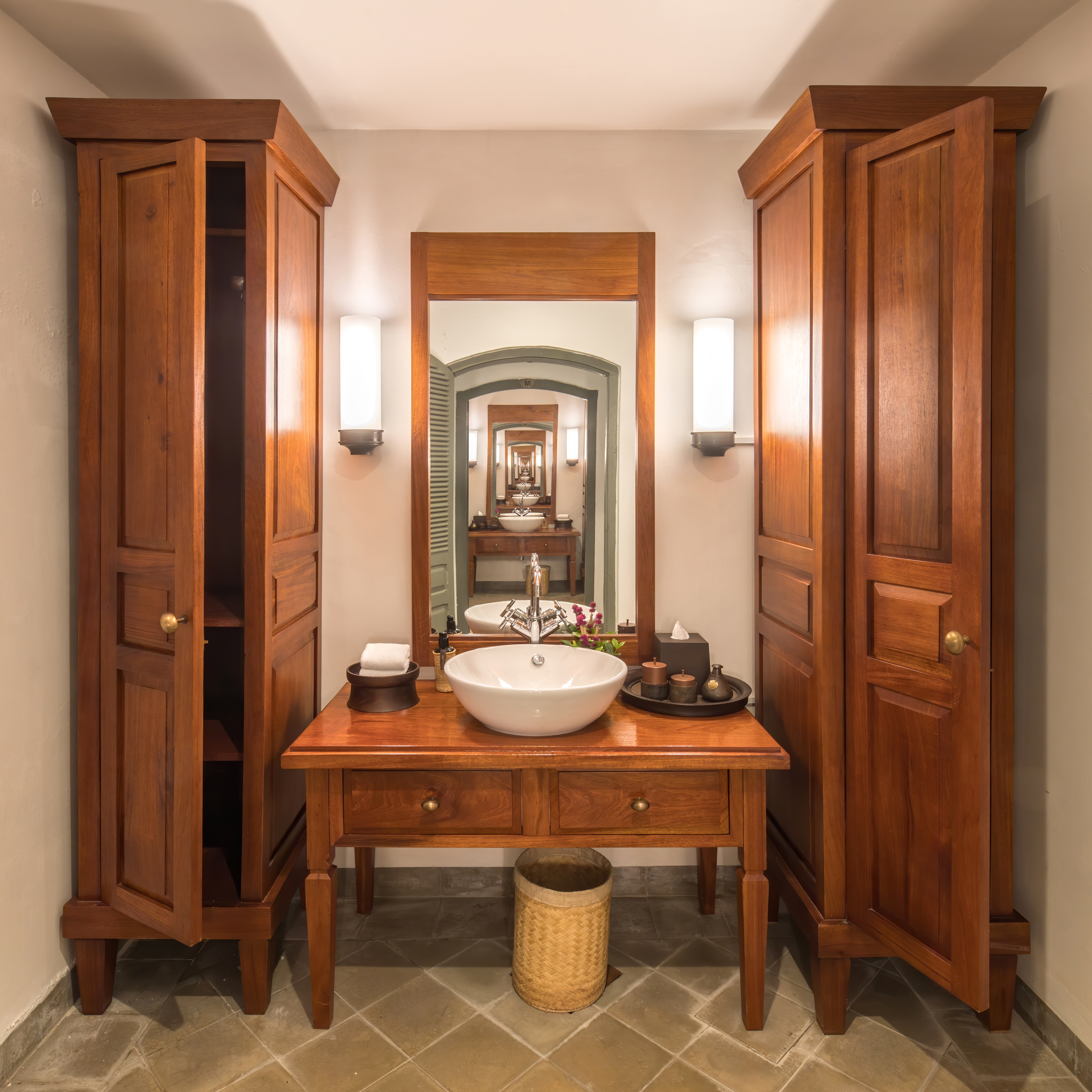
Infinity mirror, hand-washing sink and wardrobes of the spa.

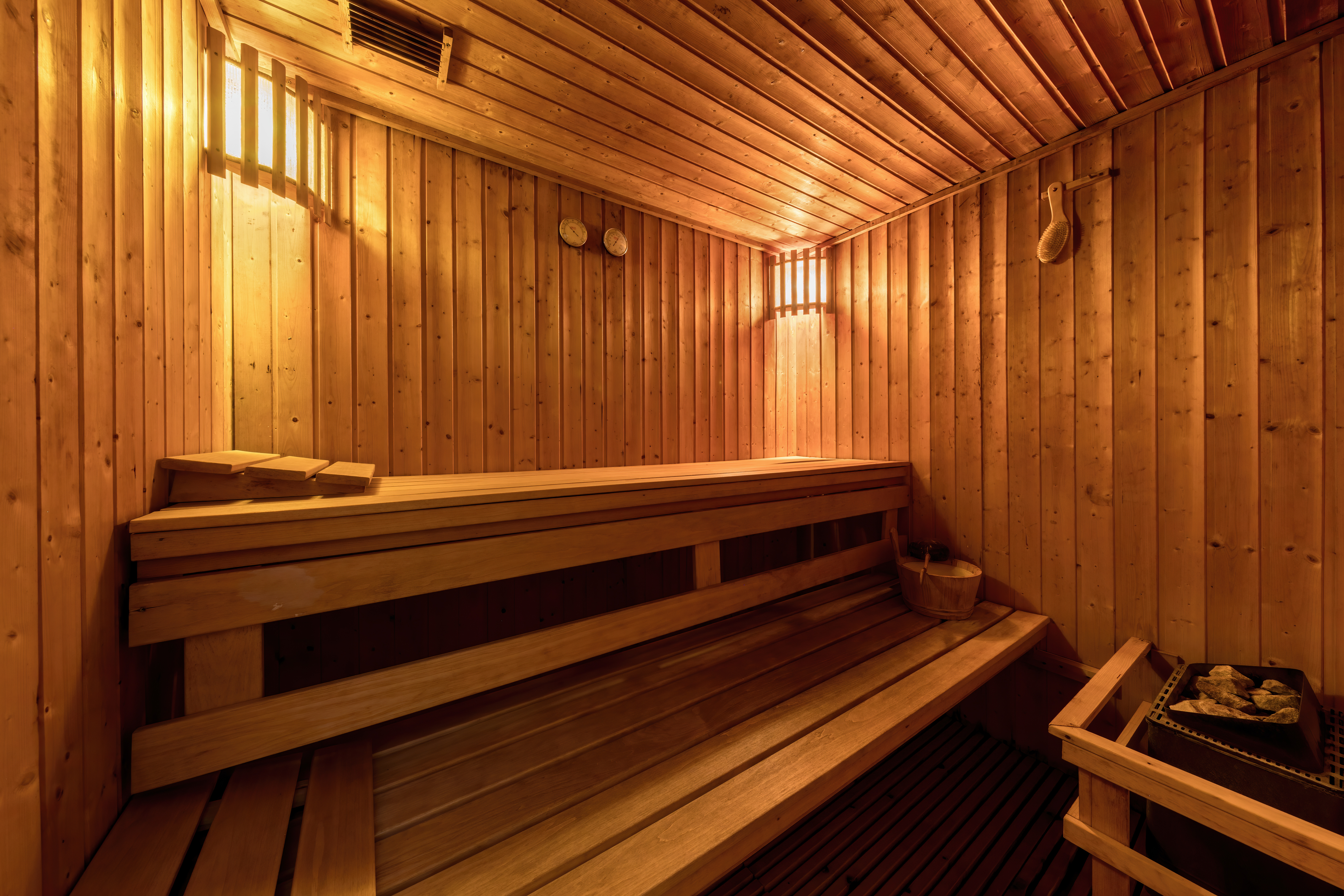
Sauna of the spa.

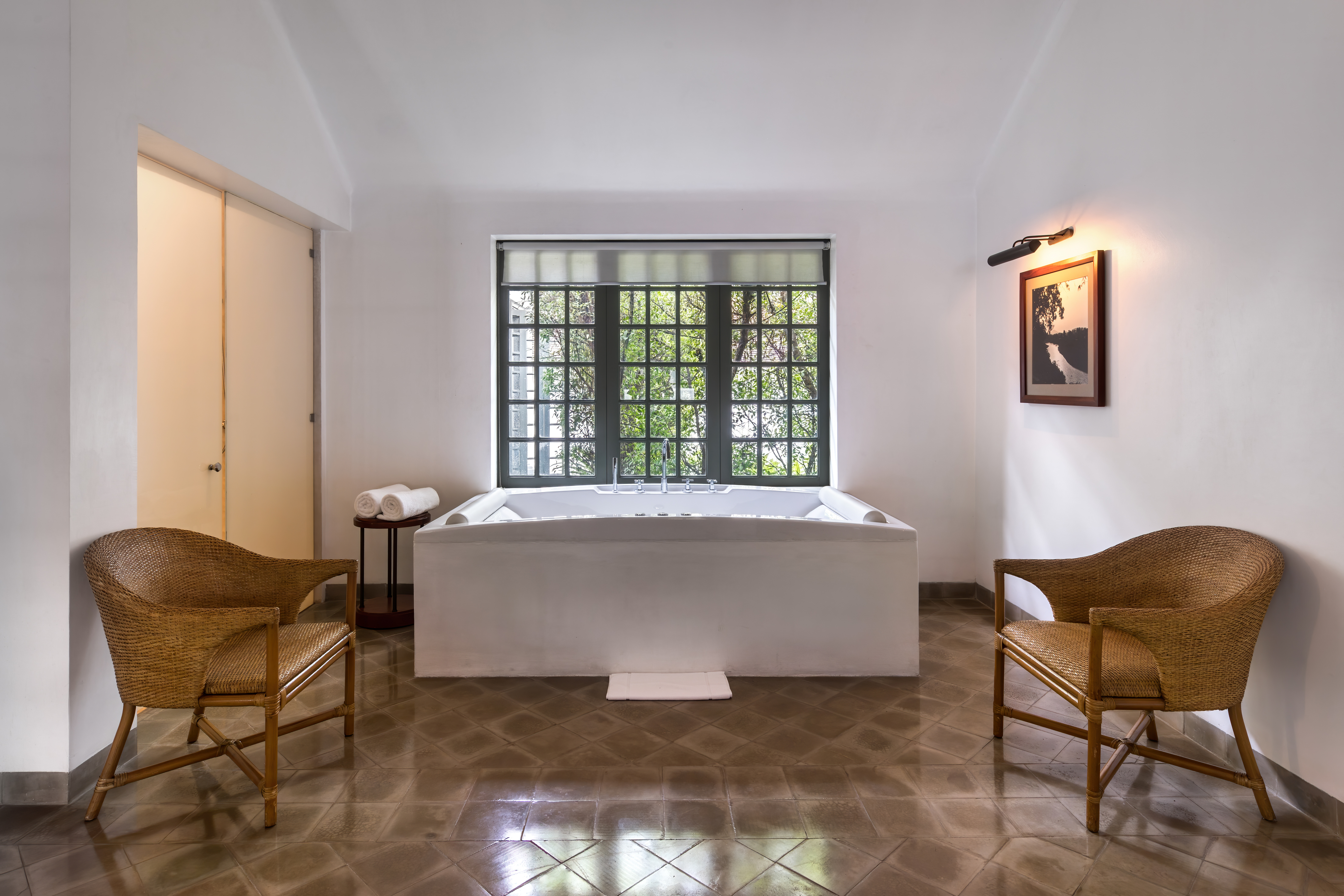
Spa bath and chairs.

== Gallery ==
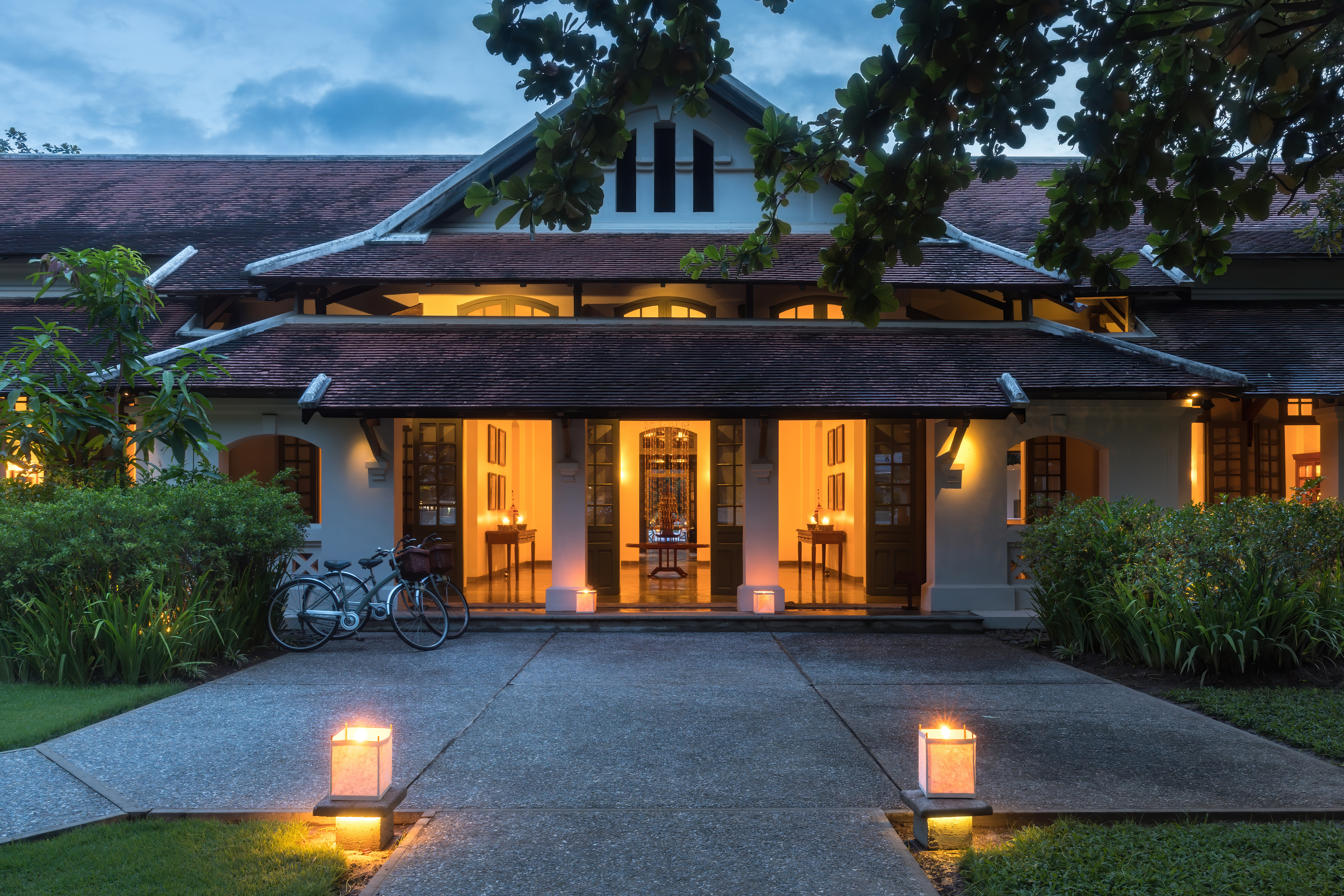
Entrance of Amantaka resort seen from outside at blue hour with candle lanterns.

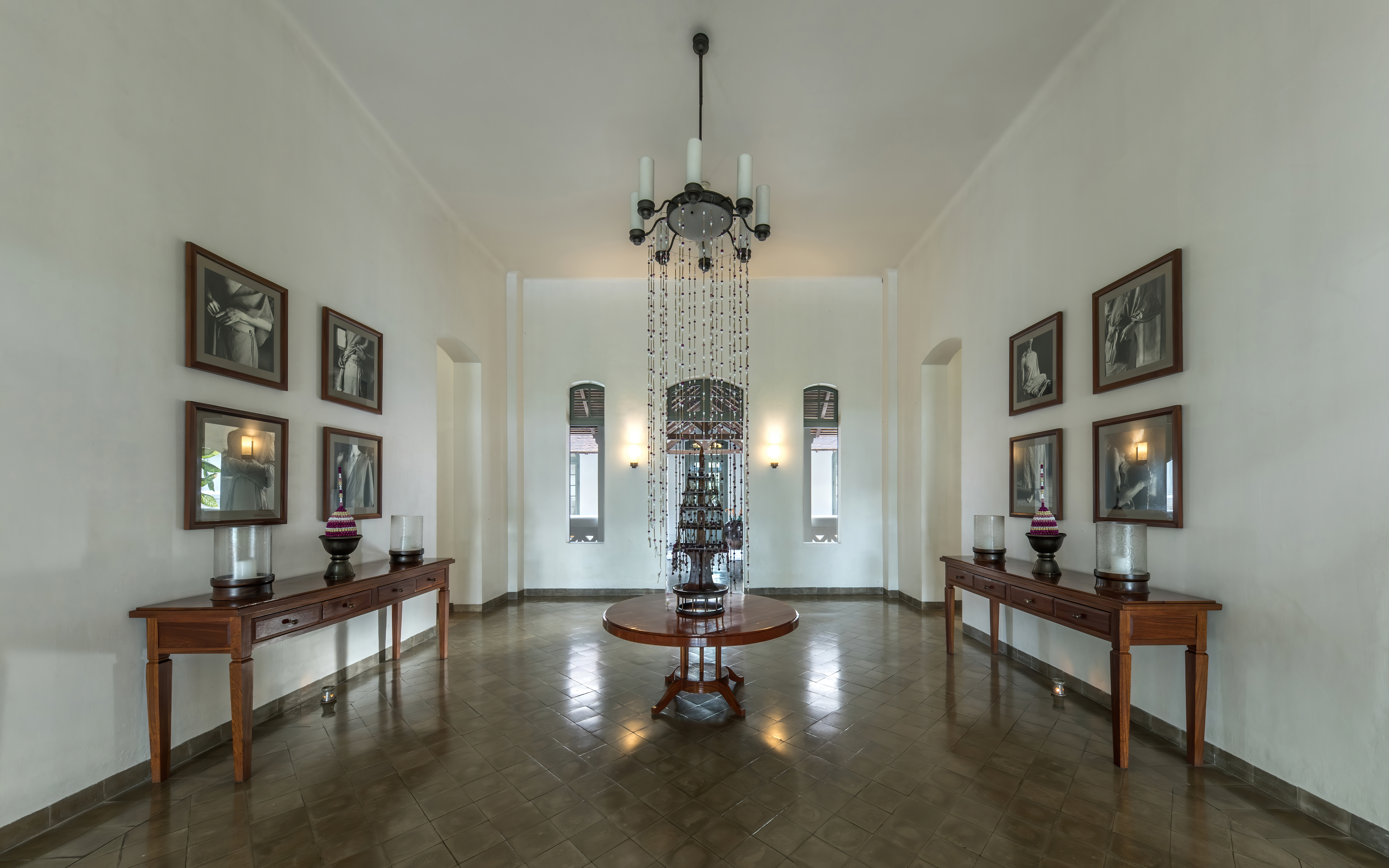
Entrance, lobby with chandelier.

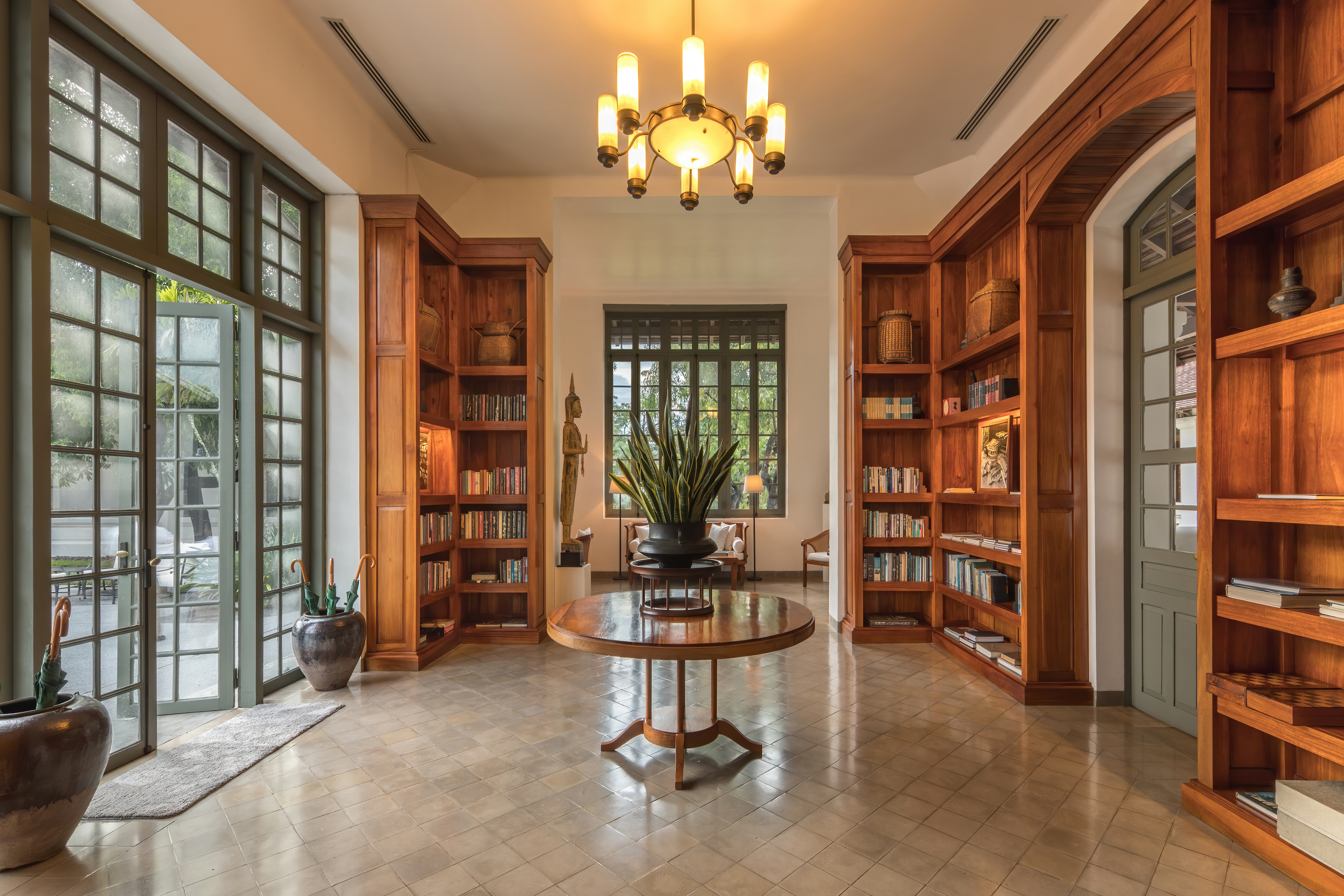
Interior of the library of the resort.

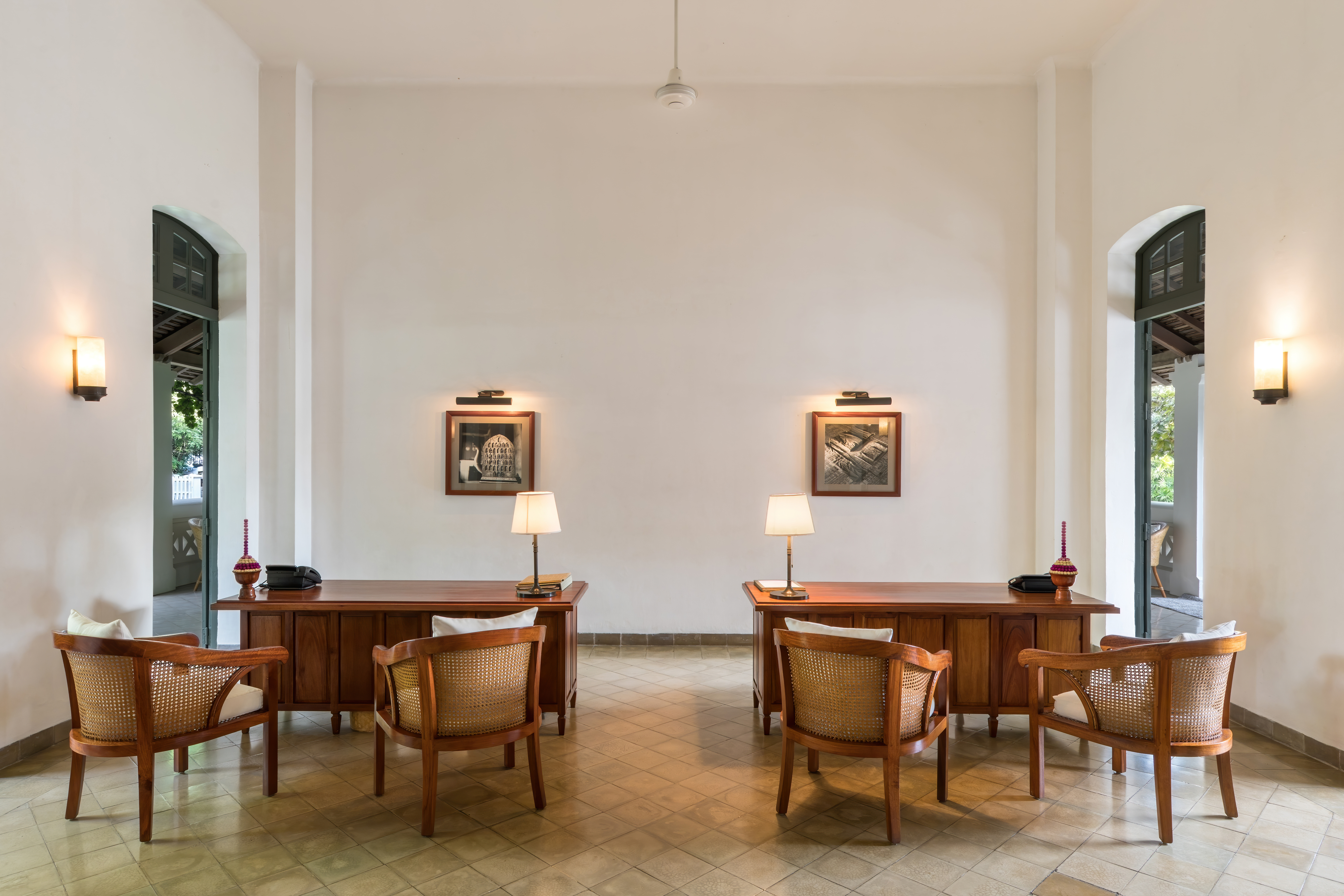
Reception desks (front office) of Amantaka.

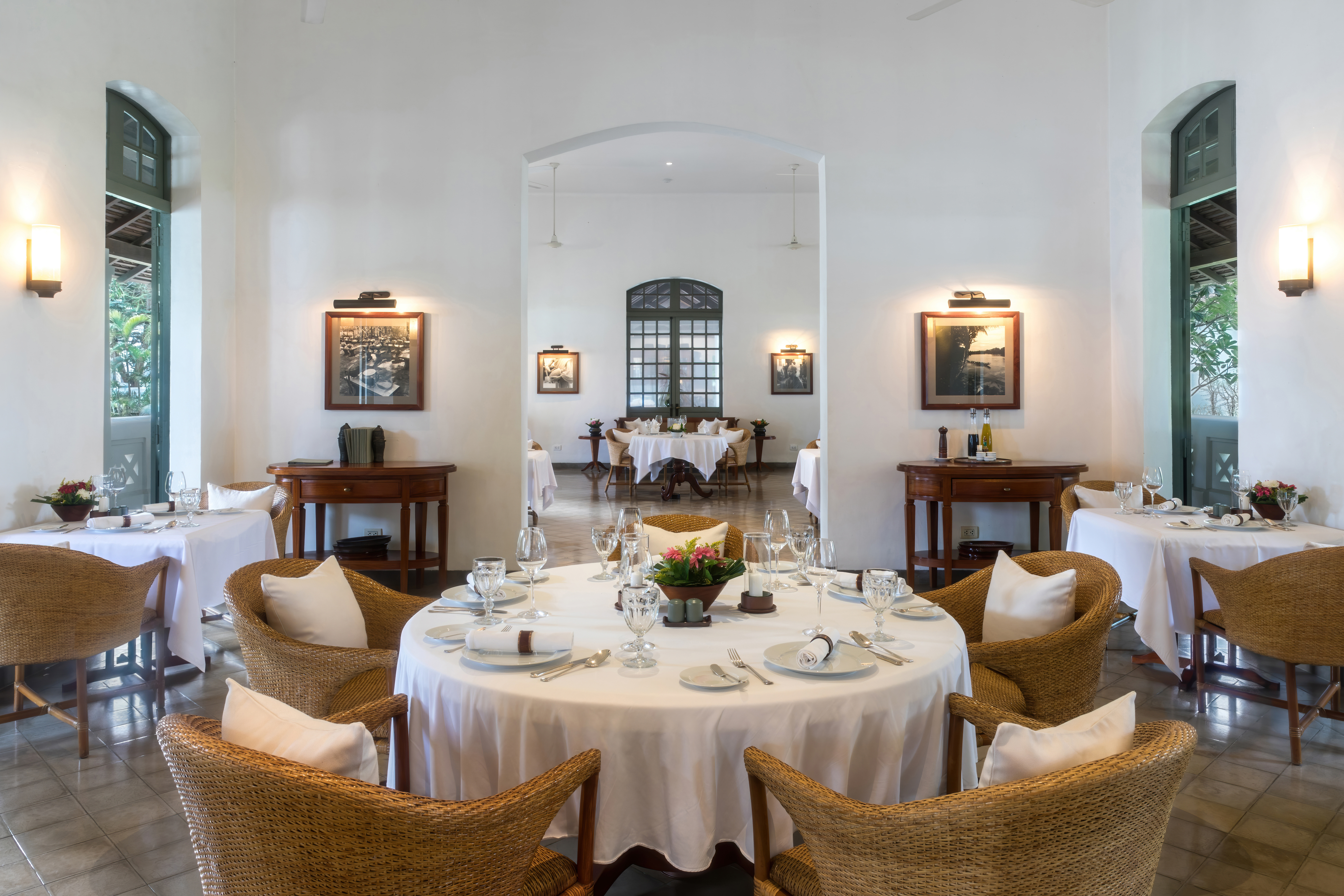
Restaurant room for breakfasts, lunches and dinners. This room is used as an annex to the pool terrace.

== Notable events ==
=== Awards ===
==== 2023 ====
- Laos's best hotel - Travel + Leisure Luxury award.
