= Hotel Beau Rivage Mekong =

Hotel in Vientiane, Laos

- Location in Laos

General information
- Location: Fa Ngum Road, Ban Seetarn Neua, Vientiane, Laos
- Coordinates: 17°57′59.3″N 102°36′0″E

Hotel Beau Rivage Mekong is a hotel in Vientiane, Laos, located on Fa Ngum Road, in Ban Seetarn Neua. It overlooks the Mekong River and is recognisable by its pink facade. The hotel is described as a boutique property situated on a quieter stretch of Fa Ngum Road along the Mekong riverside. The rooms are mostly decorated in shades of blue. The hotel is surrounded by the Pakpak Technical School, the Lao Development Bank and the Fujiwara Japanese Restaurant.
