= Don Chan Palace =

Hotel in Vientiane, Laos

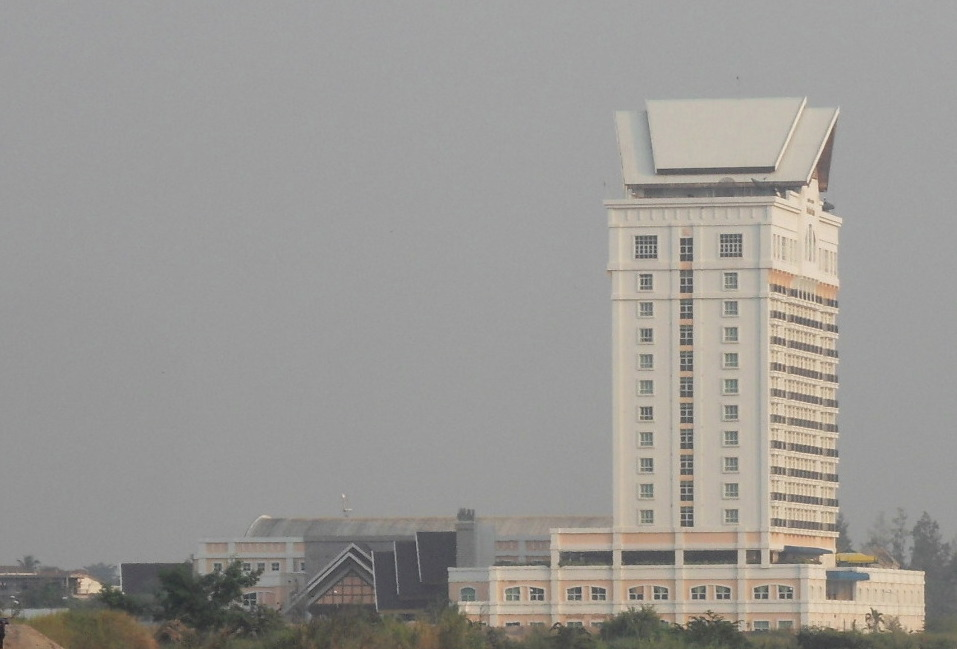

- Location in Laos

General information
- Location: Unit 6 Piawat village, Vientiane, Laos
- Coordinates: 17°57′17″N 102°36′51″E
- Opening: 2004

Technical details
- Floor count: 14

Don Chan Palace is a hotel in Vientiane, Laos, established in 2004. It is one of the tallest buildings in the country and was developed as part of the city's expanding hospitality and business infrastructure. The complex includes hotel accommodation, conference facilities, restaurants and other commercial amenities, serving tourists and business visitors to the Lao capital.

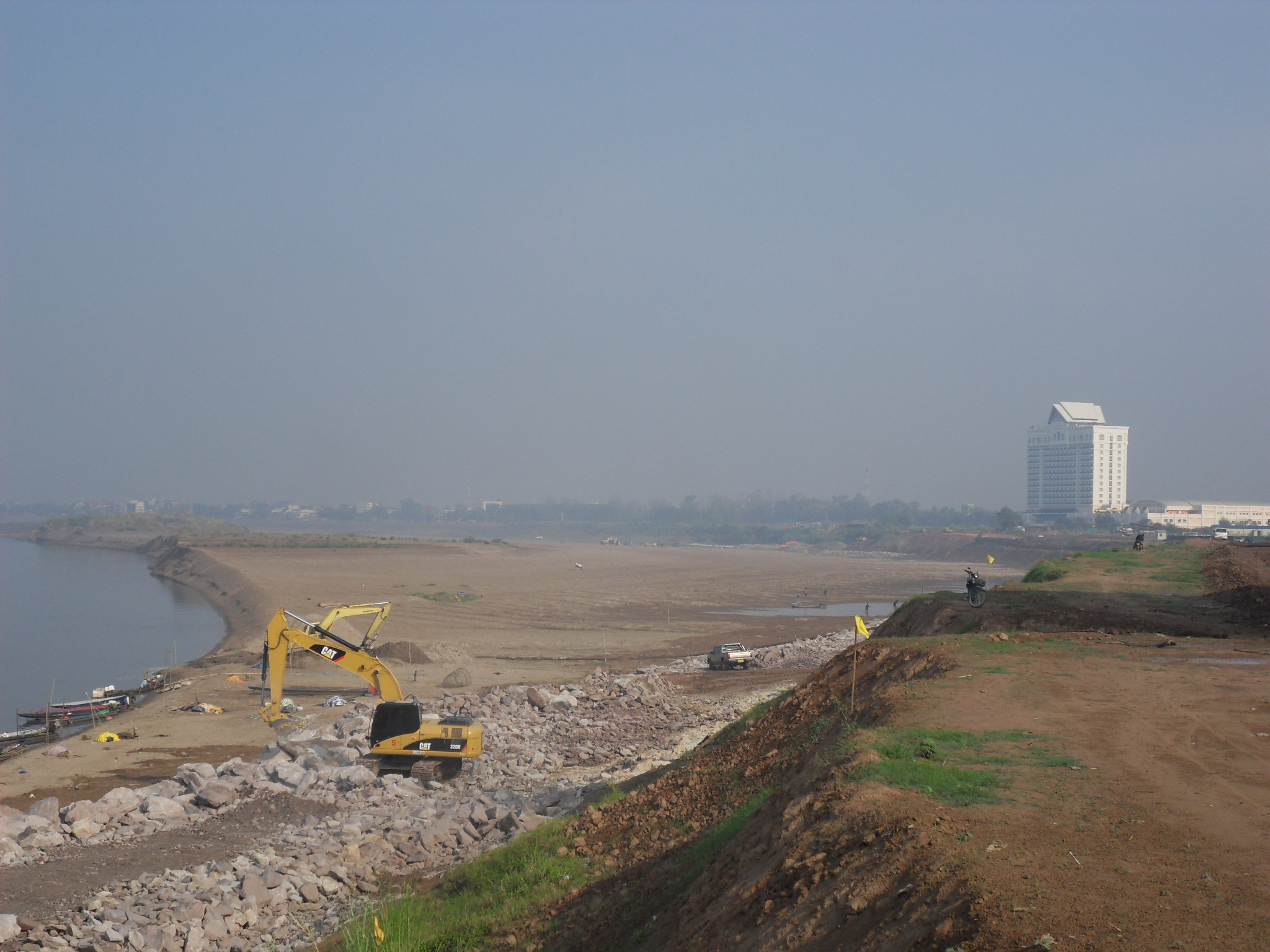
View across the reclaimed outcrop

== History ==
Don Chan Palace was developed by Malaysia's Sun Trusts Holding Company as Laos's first five-star hotel, built to accommodate delegations attending the annual ASEAN summit in Vientiane in November 2004. In April 2004, the developer said construction was on schedule to finish in October. It described a 14-storey building with 240 rooms, including 20 VIP suites, at a cost of roughly US$25 million. The hotel's own listing calls it the first international five-star hotel in Vientiane, completed in about nine months and offering 215 rooms and suites.

According to its venue listing, the hotel has 16 meeting rooms, a first-floor Riverland restaurant seating 300 guests and a Chinese restaurant for 150, and it was named Laos' Leading Hotel in 2007. Besides the 2004 summit delegates, it has hosted the 2nd ASEAN Business Summit, an ASEAN Finance Ministers' meeting and conferences linked to the 28th and 29th ASEAN Summits in 2016.

Legislation by the Vientiane government had attempted to ensure that the seven-story Patuxai monument would remain the tallest building, but the hotel developers evaded legal restrictions by building the hotel on an outcrop along on the Mekong River. The rooms of the hotel are described by Frommers as having a "muted colors with few traditional Lao furnishings". Due to its 14 floors, the hotel is an important business venue and has hosted some notable events such as Billiards and snooker at the 2009 Southeast Asian Games.
