= List of ports in Libya =

This list of Ports and harbours in Libya details the ports, harbours around the coast of Libya.

== List of ports and harbours in Libya ==
Port/Harbour name	Districts	Town name	Coordinates	UN/Locode	Max. draught (m)	Max. deadweight (t)	Remarks
Port of Tripoli	Tripoli	Tripoli	32°53′N 13°10′E	LYTIP	10.2	39710	Medium-sized port.
Port of Benghazi	Benghazi District	Benghazi	32°06′N 20°02′E	LYBEN	10.5	50563	Medium-sized port
Port of Misurata	Misrata District	Misrata	32°21′N 15°14′E	LYMRA	16.2	180716	Large-sized port. It is also known as Misuratah, Misratah, Qasr Ahmad.
Port of Khoms	Murqub District	Al-Khums	32°39′N 14°17′E	LYKHO	10.8	40426	Medium-sized port. It is also known as Khums, Al Khums, and Al Khoms.
Port of Tobruk	Butnan District	Tobruk	32°04′N 23°58′E	LYTOB	8.2	23581	Medium-sized port.
Port of Ras Lanuf	Sirte District	Ras Lanuf	30°29′N 18°35′E	LYRLA	9.5	160095	Medium-sized port.
