= Timeline of Benghazi =

The following is a timeline of the history of the city of Benghazi, Libya. (Note: The city of Benghazi is also called: Banghāzī, Bengasi, Bengazi, Benghasi, Berenice, Bernîk, Bingazi, Binghāzī, Euesperides, and Hesperides)

== Prior to 20th century ==
- 7th century BCE – Euesperides founded by Cyrenians near the site of present-day Benghazi.
- 1517 CE – Cyrenaica becomes part of Ottoman Tripolitania.
- 1577 – Atiq Mosque built.
- 1816/1817 – Massacre occurs at the Ottoman fortress.
- 1820 – Alhadadp Mosque founded.^{(ar)}
- 1827 – British consulate established.
- 1858 – Plague outbreak.
- 1869 – Administrative Benghazi mutessariflik (province) created.
- 1874 – Plague outbreak.
- 1895
  - Barracks built in Al-Berka.
  - Italian "Società d'Esplorazione Commerciale in Africa" active in Benghazi.

== 20th century ==
=== 1900s-1940s ===
- 1906 – Market burns down.
- 1911
  - 19 October: Town occupied by Italian forces during the Italo-Turkish War.
  - Population: 35,000.
- 1913 – Albergo Italia (hotel) built.
- 1914 – Benghazi–Benina railway begins operating.
- 1916 – Benghazi Central Station built.
- 1922 – Benghazi Lighthouse built.
- 1924 – City Hall built.
- 1926 – Benghazi-Suluq Railway begins operating.
- 1927
  - Benghazi–Marj railway begins operating.
  - Catholic Apostolic Vicariate of Cyrenaica established.
- 1928 – Berenice Theatre opens.
- 1931 – September: Trial of Omar Mukhtar, leading to his execution on 16 September in nearby Suluq.
- 1934
  - Pier built in the Port of Benghazi.
  - Administrative Benghazi Province created.
- 1936 – Hotel Berenice built.
- 1937 – March: Mussolini visits Benghazi.
- 1939 – Benghazi Cathedral built.
- 1942
  - November: British forces take city during the Battle of El Agheila in World War II.
  - Italian rule ends.
  - Omar al-Mukhtar Society formed.
- 1945 – Population: 60,000 (approximate).
- 1947 – Ahly Benghazi football club active.

=== 1950s-1990s ===
- 1952
  - Al-Hilal SC (sport club) formed.
  - University of Oxford's Ashmolean Expedition to Cyrenaica begins its archaeological excavation of Euesperides site.
- 1953 – City boundary established.
- 1954 – Al Tahaddy SC (football club) formed.
- 1955 – University of Libya founded.
- 1956 – Benghazi Zoo founded.
- 1957 – Benghazi Military University Academy established.
- 1964 – Population: 137,295.
- 1967 – Stadium and Suliman Ad-Dharrath Arena open.
- 1970s – Giuliana Bridge opens.
- 1973
  - University of Benghazi active.
  - Population: 266,000.
- 1980 – February: Protest at French consulate.
- 1982
  - March: Part of 1982 African Cup of Nations football contest held in Benghazi.
  - Convention centre built.
- 1984 – Population: 442,860.
- 1986 – 15 April: Aerial bombing of city by United States forces.
- 1989 – Tibesti Hotel (hi-rise) built.
- 1990 – Population: 800,000 (estimate).
- 1991 – "Administrative Office Complex" (hi-rise) built.
- 1993 – September: Great Man-Made River constructed; water begins flowing to Benghazi.
- 2000
  - 1 September: Al-Ahly football stadium demolished.
  - September: Unrest.

== 21st century ==
- 2005 – Population: 685,367 (estimate).
- 2006 – 15 February: Protest against Muhammad cartoons.
- 2007 – Quryna newspaper begins publication.
- 2008 – Sirt–Benghazi Railway construction begins.
- 2009 – Martyrs of February Stadium opens in nearby Benina.
- 2011
  - 15 February: Arab Spring-related protest; Libyan Civil War (2011) begins.
  - Al Kalima newspaper begins publication.
- 2012
  - 19 May: Local election held.
  - June: Pro-autonomy mob ransacks the election commission building.
  - September: United States consulate attacked.
- 2014
  - 16 May: Benina International Airport closes due to fighting.
  - 15 October: Battle of Benghazi begins.
- 2017
  - 18 April: Abdelrahman Alabbar becomes mayor.
  - 15 July: Benina Airport reopens.
  - 27 July: Battle of Benghazi officially concludes.

== See also ==
- History of Benghazi
- Timeline of Tripoli, Libya
- Timeline of the Italian Empire

== Bibliography ==
- Ferdinando Borsari (1888), "Evesperide o Berenice (Bengasi)", Geografia etnologica e storica della Tripolitania, Cirenaica e Fezzan (in Italian), Turin: Ermanno Loescher
- Giacomo De Martino (1908). "Bengasi". Cirene e Cartagine (in Italian). Bologna: Nicola Zanichelli. pp. 85–110.
- Hogarth, David George (1910). "Bengazi" . Encyclopædia Britannica. Vol. 3 (11th ed.). p. 736.
- "Benghazi", The Mediterranean, Leipzig: Karl Baedeker, 1911, OCLC 490068
- "Bengasi", Enciclopedia Italiana (Treccani) (in Italian), 1930
- "Cirenaica: Rossa di sangue, verde di piante". Varietas (in Italian). Vol. 30. Milan. 1934. (Includes information about Benghazi)
- J. Despois [in French] (1960). "Beng̲hāzī". Encyclopaedia of Islam (2nd ed.). E.J. Brill.
  - Ewald Banse (1913). "Beng̲hāzī". Encyclopaedia of Islam. E.J. Brill.
- Richard George Goodchild [in French] (1954). Benghazi, the story of a city. OCLC 822712914.
- Hadi M.R. Bulugma (1964). Urban Geography of Benghazi (Ph.D.). Durham University.
- Pierre Marthelot (1964). "Une ville aux chances successives: Benghazi". Bulletin de l'Association de géographes français (in French). 41 (328): 32–41. doi:10.3406/bagf.1964.5705. OCLC 876706131 – via Persee.fr.
- Hadi M. Bulugma (1968). Benghazi through the Ages. Tripoli. OCLC 28490247.
- John Wright (1992). "Wadai-Benghazi Slave Route". Slavery & Abolition. 13. ISSN 0144-039X.
- Francesco Prestopino (1999). Una città e il suo fotografo: la Bengasi coloniale, 1912-1941 (in Italian). Milan. ISBN 8877998423.
- Khaled Mattawa (2007). "Dispatches from Benghazi". PMLA. 122 (1). US: Modern Language Association: 264–270. doi:10.1632/pmla.2007.122.1.264. JSTOR 25501686. S2CID 162208623.
- Frederic Wehrey (1 July 2017). "'Whoever Controls Benghazi Controls Libya': A revolutionary city rises in the shadow of strongman Khalifa Haftar". The Atlantic. US.

== Images ==
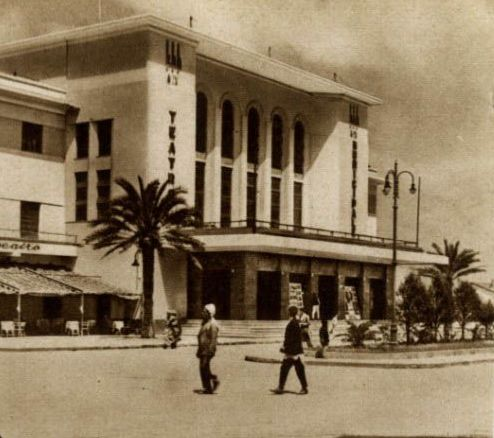
Berenice Theatre, Benghazi, opened in 1928; designed by Marcello Piacentini
