= List of bridges in Libya =

== Major bridges ==
| | Name | Arabic | Span | Length | Type | Carries Crosses | Opened | Location | District | Ref. |
|---|---|---|---|---|---|---|---|---|---|---|
| 1 | Wadi el Kuf Bridge | جسر وادي الكوف | 282 m (925 ft) | 477 m (1,565 ft) | Cable-stayed; Concrete box girder deck, concrete pylons 97+282+97 | Abraq Road; Kouf Valley | 1972 | Bayda; 32°41′48.6″N 21°33′55.3″E | Jabal al Akhdar | |
| 2 | Giuliana Bridge | جسر جليانة | 120 m (390 ft) | 280 m (920 ft) | Box girder Prestressed concrete 80+120+80 | Algeria Street; 23rd July Lake | 1970s | Benghazi; 32°06′14.7″N 20°03′28.9″E | Benghazi (district) | |
| 3 | Wadi el Kuf Old Bridge | جسر وادي الكوف القديم | | | Bailey bridge | | | Bayda; 32°41′54.8″N 21°34′28.4″E | Jabal al Akhdar | |

== See also ==
- Transport in Libya
- List of aqueducts in the Roman Empire
