= Timeline of Tripoli, Libya =

The following is a timeline of the history of the city of Tripoli, Libya.

== Prior to 19th century ==
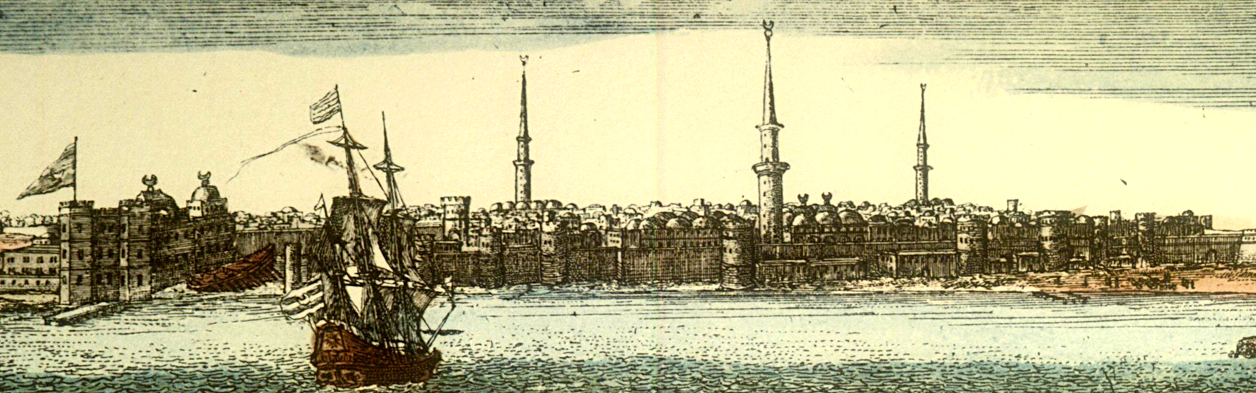
View of Tripoli in Barbary, 1675

- 7th C. BCE
  - Tripoli was founded by Phoenicians
  - Cyrenaica (eastern coastal region of Libya) colonized by the Greeks
- 2nd C. BCE - Romans in power.
- 163 CE - Roman Triumphal Arch built (approximate date).
- 533- Successful recovered by Byzantines of Egypt
- 643 - Rashidun caliphate subdued Tripoli.
- 1140 - Normans in power in Tripolitania.
- 1149 - Tripoli pillaged by the Normans of Sicily.
- 1401 - Tripoli was reconquered by the Tunisians.
- 1510 - 25 July: Spanish forces captured the city; it remained under Spanish rule for the next two decades.
- 1530 - Tripoli granted to the Knights Hospitaller; it remained under their rule for the next two decades.
- 1551 - August: City besieged by Ottoman forces led by Sinan Pasha, Turgut Reis, and Murad Agha.
- 1556 - Cathedral mosque built.
- 1559 - St. Peter fortress built.
- 1604 - Iskandar Pasha hammam built.
- 1610 - Jama'a al-Naqa'a (mosque of the camel) restored.
- 1654 - Uthman Pasha Madrasa built.
- 1670 - Sidi Salem (building) restored.
- 1671 - Darghouth Turkish Bath established.
- 1675 - Conflict between Barbary corsairs and British naval forces.
- 1680 - Mosque of Mahmud Khaznadar built.
- 1699 - Mosque of Muhammad Pasha built.
- 1711 - Ahmed Karamanli in power.
- 1736 - Ahmad Pasha al-Qarahmanli mosque built.

== 19th century ==
- 1801 - First Barbary War begins.
- 1804 - Second Battle of Tripoli Harbor.
- 1815 - Second Barbary War.
- 1823 - Population: 15,000.
- 1825 - August: Battle of Tripoli.
- 1834 - Gurgi Mosque built.
- 1835 - Ottomans in power.
- 1846 - Santa Maria degli Angeli church built.
- 1858 - Arab demonstrations.
- 1859 - Technical school established.
- 1860 - Bab el-Jedid (gate) opens.
- 1870 - Torre dell'Orologio built.
- 1879 - Primary schools open.
- 1882 - Population: 25,000.
- 1883 - Royal Italian School opens.

== 20th century ==
- 1911
  - Italo-Turkish War
  - Population: 29,869.
- 1919 - Archaeological Museum established in the Red Castle
- 1924 - Lungomare Conte Volpi constructed.
- 1925
  - Tripoli Grand Prix begins.
  - Grand Hotel built.
- 1927 - Tripoli International Fair begins.
- 1928 - Tripoli Cathedral, Miramare Theatre, and Bank of Italy building constructed.
- 1929 - Governor's Palace built.
- 1935 - Suq al-Mushir reconstructed.
- 1937 - March: Mussolini visits city.
- 1938
  - Population: 108,240.
  - Italian military airfield built.
- 1939 - 7 October Stadium built.
- 1943
  - Allied forces in power; British occupation begins.
  - British military airport Castel Benito in operation.
- 1944
  - Al-Ittihad Sport, Cultural and Social Club formed.
  - United States military base built at Wheelus Field.
- 1950
  - Al-Ahly Sports Club formed.
  - Corriere del Lunedi founded.
- 1951 - City becomes capital of United Libyan Kingdom.
- 1953 - Almadina Sporting Club formed.
- 1964 - Population: 213,506.
- 1973
  - University of Tripoli established.
  - Population: 551,477.
- 1975 - Misurata-Tripoli highway constructed.
- 1978
  - Libyan Studies Center opens.
  - Tripoli International Airport renovated.
- 1982
  - June 11 Stadium opens.
  - Grand Hotel Tripoli built.
- 1986 - 15 April - Aerial bombing by United States forces.
- 1990 - That El Emad Towers built.
- 2000 - GMR Stadium opens.

== 21st century ==
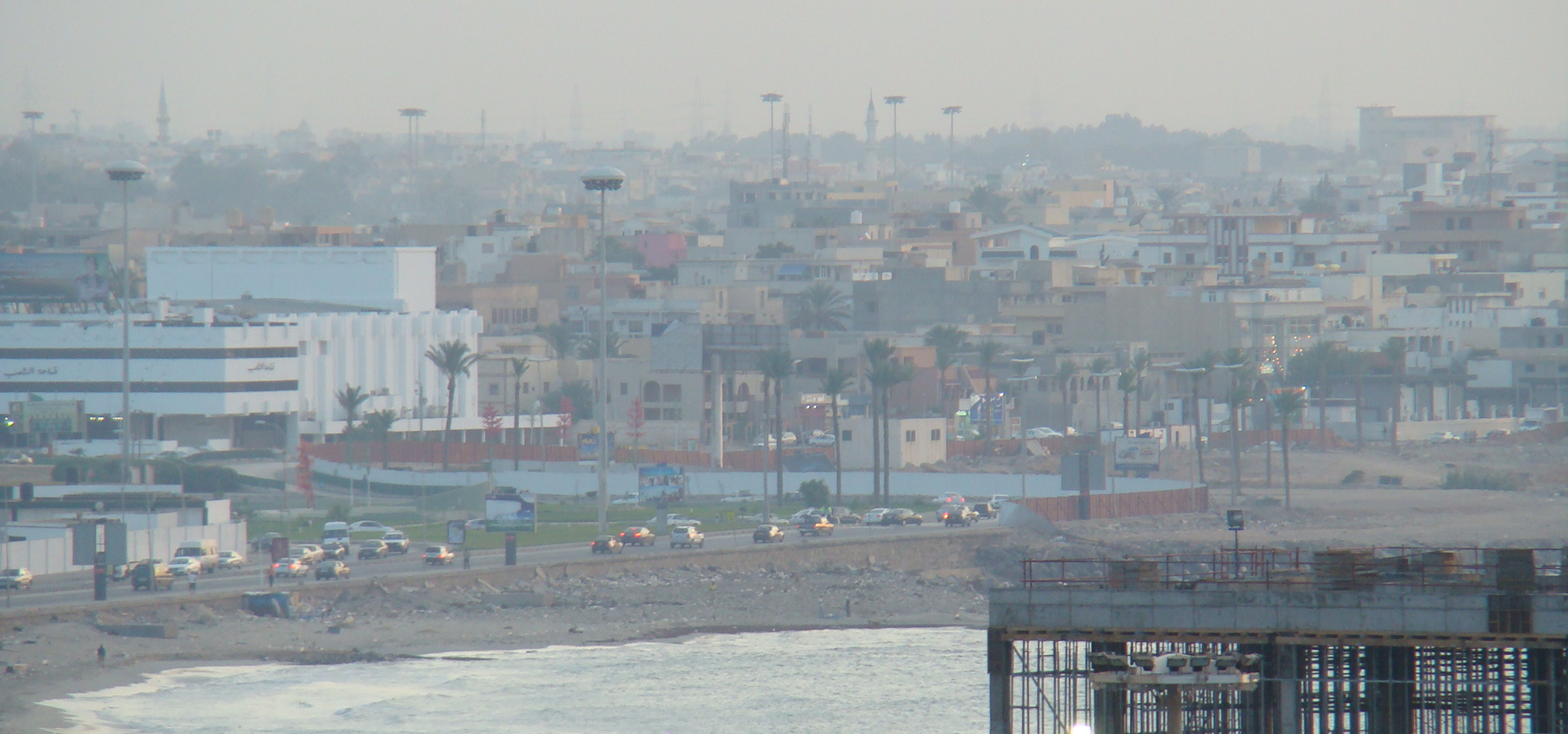
View of Tripoli, 2009

- 2011
  - 17–25 February: Tripoli protests and clashes.
  - 20–28 August: Battle of Tripoli.
  - 11 October: Tripoli International Airport re-opens.
  - 14 October: Tripoli clashes.
  - Population: 1,127,000.
- 2012 - General National Congress begins meeting in Ghabat Al Nasr Convention Centre.
- 2020 - Since January 6, 2020, GNA started entering the town, recapturing it from LNA.
- 2025 – The UN-recognized Libyan government in the west of the country is expected to assert its control, following the reported killing of powerful militia leader Abdelghani al-Kikli, also known as Gheniwa.

== See also ==
- Tripoli history
- Pasha of Tripoli
- Tripolitania
- Timeline of Benghazi

== Bibliography ==
- Ali Bey (1816), "Chapter 22 (Tripoli)", Travels of Ali Bey in Morocco, Tripoli, Cyprus, Egypt, Arabia, Syria, and Turkey, Between the Years 1803 and 1807, Philadelphia: John Conrad, OCLC 754174
- Richard Tully (1819), Letters Written During a Ten Years' Residence at the Court of Tripoli (3rd ed.), London: H. Colburn. v.1
- Jedidiah Morse; Richard C. Morse (1823), "Tripoli", A New Universal Gazetteer (4th ed.), New Haven: S. Converse, OL 7216242M
- Josiah Conder (1830), "Tripoli", The Modern Traveller, London: J.Duncan
- R. Lambert Playfair (1889), Bibliography of the Barbary States, Part 1: Tripoli and the Cyrenaica, London, OCLC 12038289, OL 14046206M
- R. Lambert Playfair (1892), "Tripoli", Handbook to the Mediterranean (3rd ed.), London: John Murray
- Leo Africanus; John Pory (1896), "Tripolis in Barbarie", in Robert Brown (ed.), History and Description of Africa, vol. 3, London: Hakluyt Society, OCLC 2649691
- "Tripoli". Guide to the Western Mediterranean. London: Macmillan and Co. 1906.
- Keane, Augustus Henry; Cana, Frank Richardson (1910). "Tripoli (North Africa)" . Encyclopædia Britannica. Vol. 27 (11th ed.). pp. 288–291.
- "Tripoli", The Mediterranean, Leipzig: Karl Baedeker, 1911, OCLC 490068
- Charles Wellington Furlong (1914), Gateway to the Sahara: Observations and Experiences in Tripoli (2nd ed.), New York: C. Scribner's Sons, OCLC 4904661, OL 6569158M
- "Tripoli". Encyclopaedia of Islam. E.J. Brill. 1936. p. 814+. via Google Books
- Robert S. Harrison (1967). "Migrants in the City of Tripoli, Libya". Geographical Review. 57 (3): 397. Bibcode:1967GeoRv..57..397H. doi:10.2307/212641. JSTOR 212641.
- Ward, Philip. 1969. Tripoli: Portrait of a City. Cambridge, England: The Oleander Press,
- Warfelli, Muhammad. 1976. The Old City of Tripoli. Art and Archaeology Research Papers.
- M. Brett (1986). "The City-State in Medieval Ifriqiya: the Case of Tripoli". Les Cahiers de Tunisie. 34.
- Krystyna von Henneberg (1994). "Tripoli: Piazza Castello and the Making of a Fascist Colonial Capital". In Zeynep Çelik; Diane Favro; Richard Ingersoll (eds.). Streets: Critical Perspectives on Public Space. University of California Press.
- Paul Tiyambe Zeleza; Dickson Eyoh, eds. (2003). "Tripoli, Libya". Encyclopedia of Twentieth-Century African History. Routledge. ISBN 0-415-23479-4.
- Kevin Shillington, ed. (2005). "Tripoli". Encyclopedia of African History. Fitzroy Dearborn. ISBN 978-1-57958-245-6.
- Ludovico Micara (2008). "Ottoman Tripoli: a Mediterranean Medina". The City in the Islamic World. Leiden: Koninklijke Brill. ISBN 978-9004162402.
- Ali Irhuma Abubrig (2016). "Urban Growth and Sustainability in Tripoli, Libya". University Bulletin. 18 (2). Libya: Al Zawiya University.
