= Uzu Hotel =

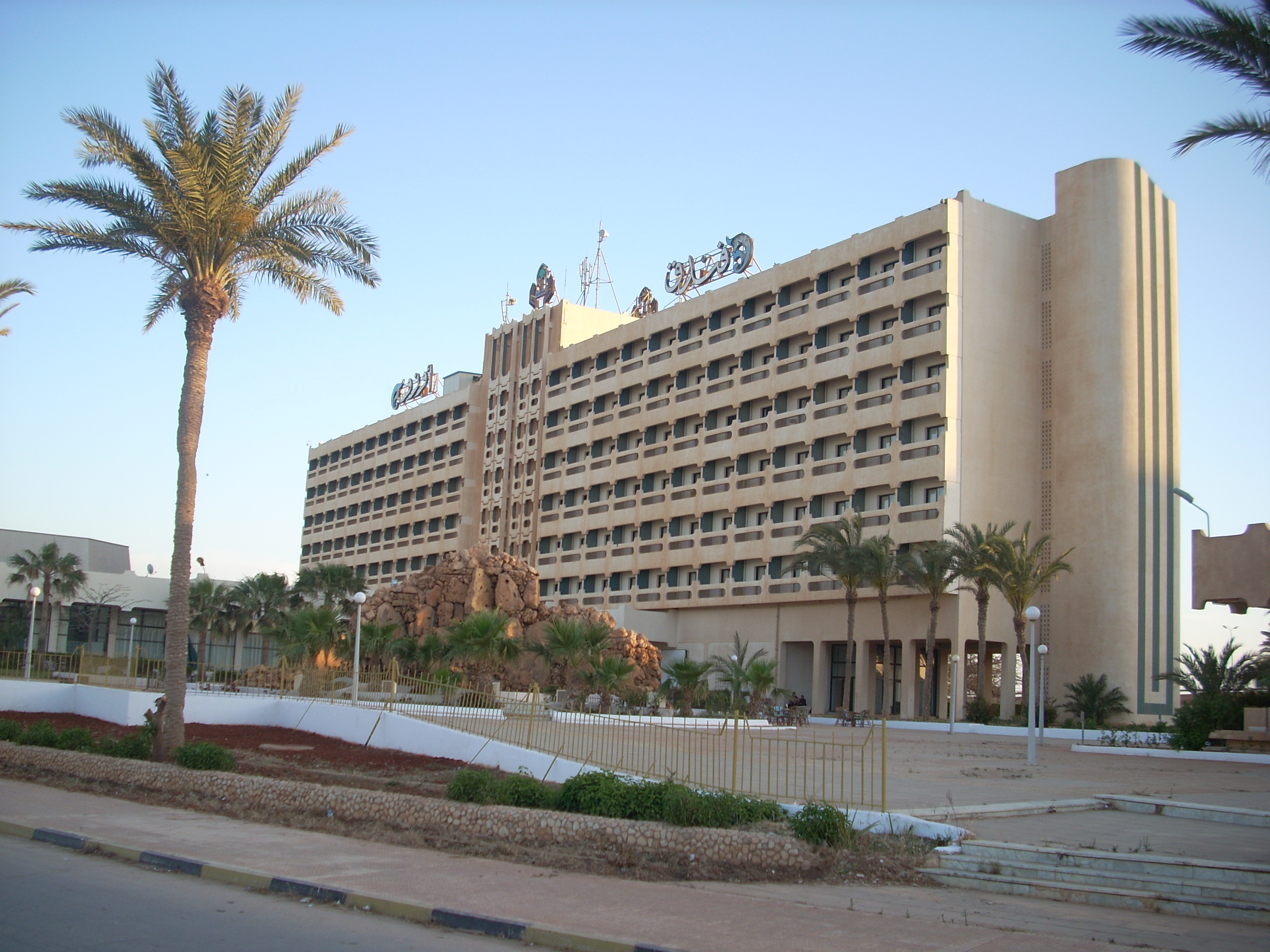

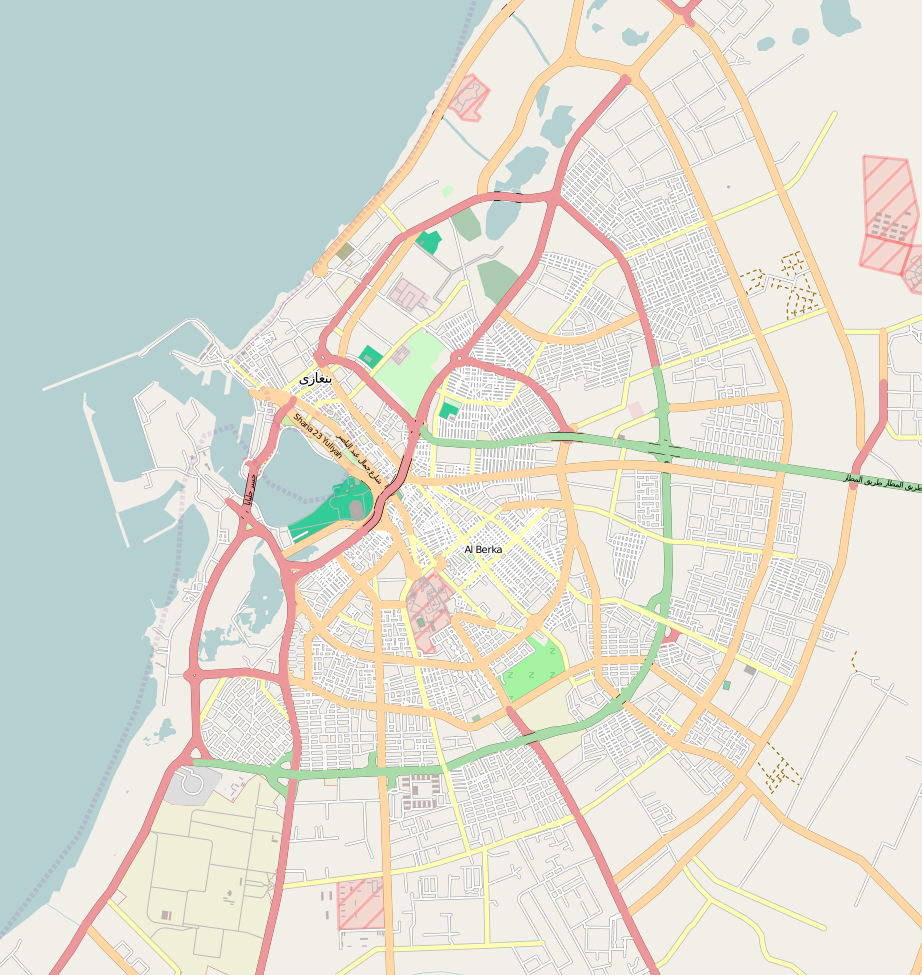
- Location within Benghazi

General information
- Location: Benghazi, Libya
- Coordinates: 32°6′4″N 20°3′32″E

Uzu Hotel or Ozoo or Ouzou Hotel is a hotel in Benghazi, Libya, overlooking the 23 July Lake of the inner harbour. It contains 184 rooms (or 262 according to two other sources) and is served by the Jasmine Cafe. The hotel was once nearly destroyed by a missile.
