= Transport in Libya =

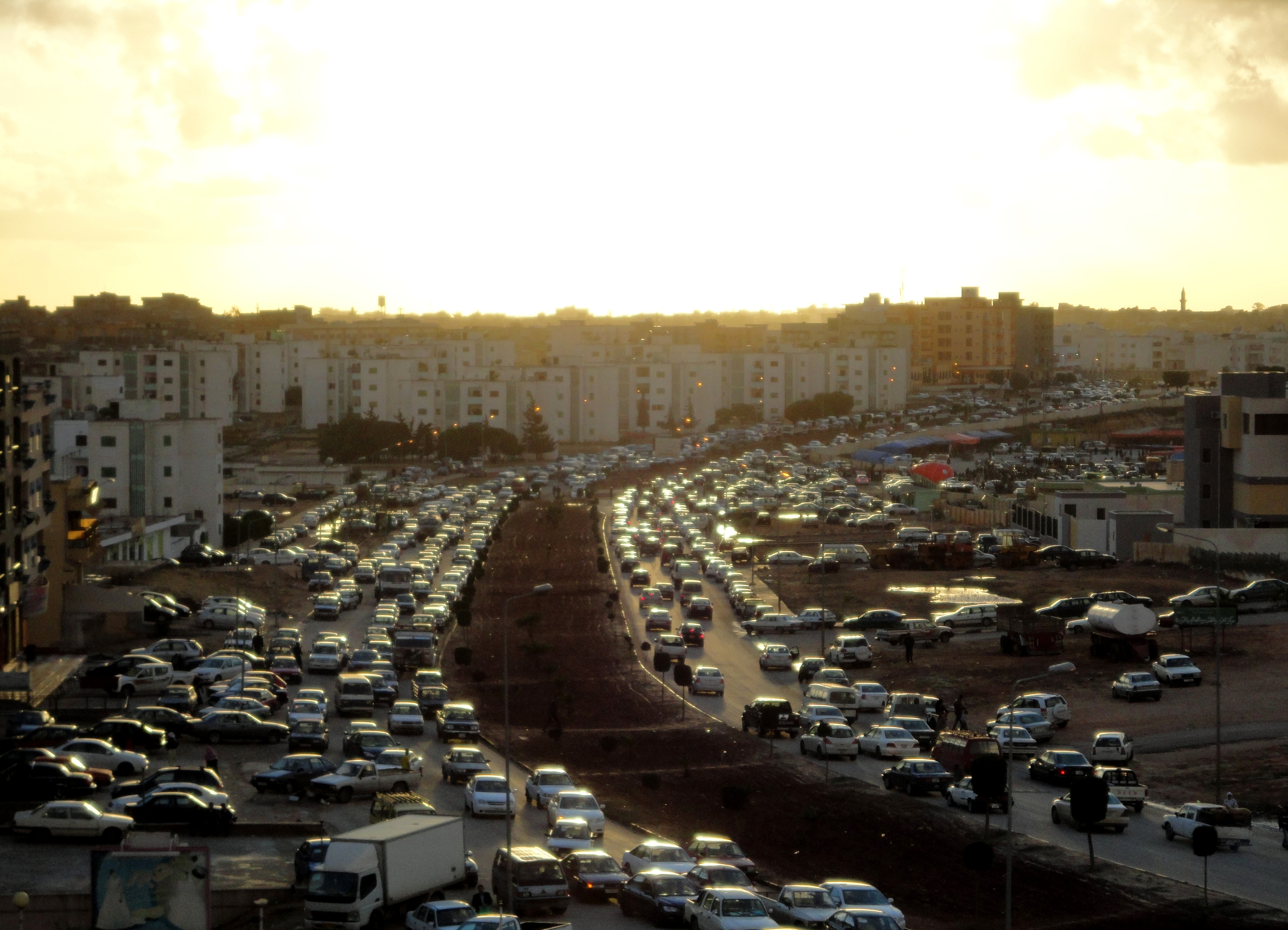
Traffic congestion in Bayda, Libya in 2010

== Railways ==
Libya has had no railway in operation since 1965, all previous narrow gauge lines having been dismantled. Plans for a new network have been under development for some time (earthworks were begun between Sirte and Ras Ajdir, Tunisia border, in 2001–5), and in 2008 and 2009 various contracts were placed and construction work started on a 1,435 mm (4 ft 8 1/2 in) standard gauge railway parallel to the coast from the Tunisian border at Ras Ajdir to Tripoli, and on to Misrata, Sirte, Benghazi and Bayda. Another railway line will run inland from Misrata to Sabha at the centre of a mineral-rich area.

== Highways ==
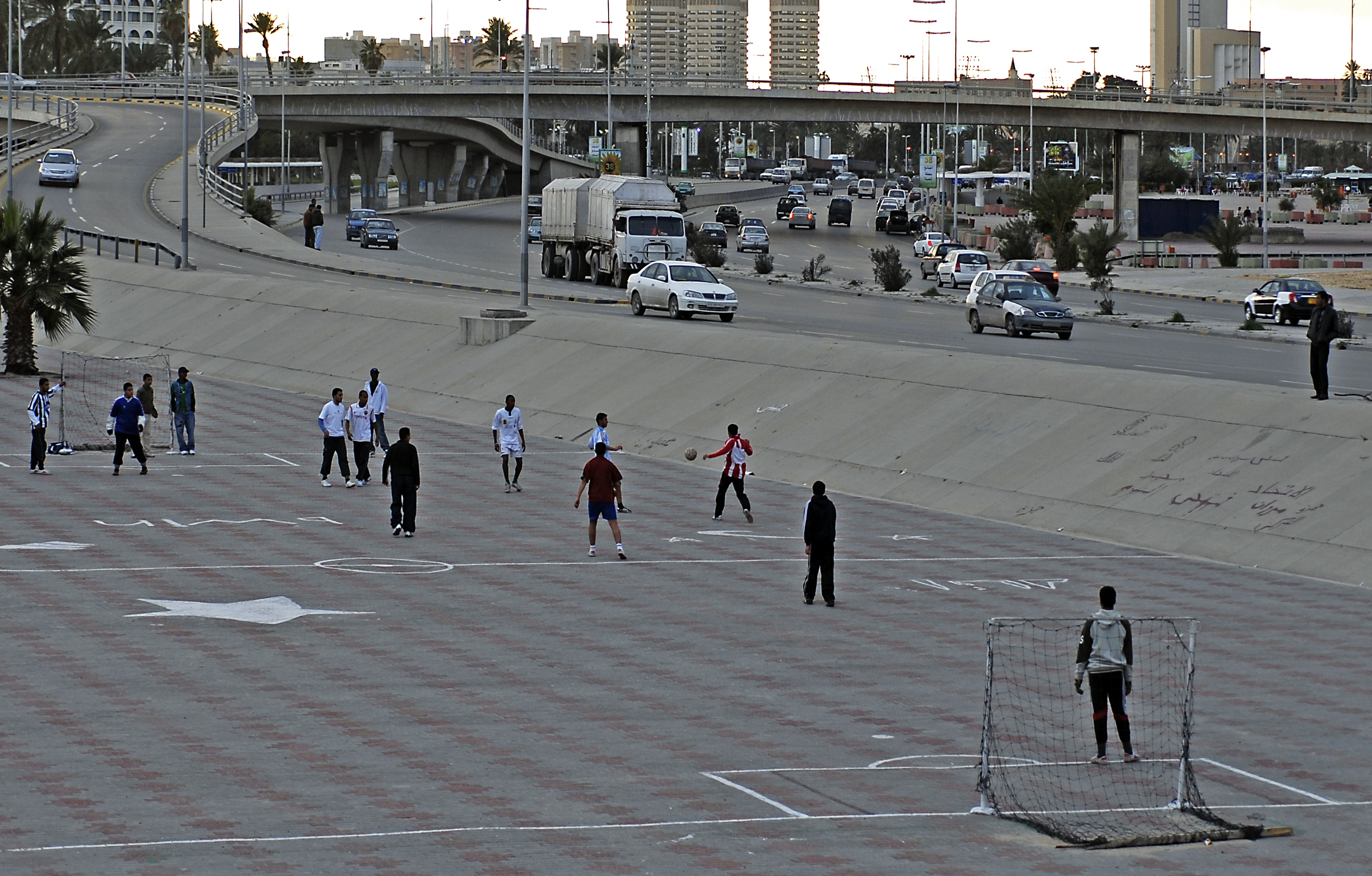
A flyover on an urban highway in the capital Tripoli

Total: 83,200 km
Paved: 47,590 km
Unpaved: 35,610 km (1996 est.)

There are about 83,200 km of roads in Libya, 47,590 km of which are surfaced. In 2020, there were an estimated 490 vehicles in use per 1000 residents, the highest rate in Africa. The best roads run along the coast between Tripoli and Tunis in Tunisia; also between Benghazi and Tobruk, connecting with Alexandria in Egypt. A fairly efficient bus service operates along these routes, with two main bus transport companies. One covers long-distance, international routes, while the other is chiefly engaged in shorter trips between towns. Bus fares are low and the standard of comfort, particularly on international routes is good, with air-conditioned vehicles and good service.

Taxis are available in the larger towns and are usually hired on a shared basis, although individual hire can be negotiated. The driving skills of taxi drivers are extremely variable. Taxis may have meters, but these are rarely in use. Car hire for self-drive is not recommended in Libya, although it is possible to hire a vehicle from agents in larger hotels. Vehicles are often old and poorly maintained, however, and are unequal to long-distance driving. Driving itself can be hazardous and there is a high rate of road accidents.

=== Regional highways ===
Libya has two routes in the Trans-African Highway network, but only one currently functions as such, the Cairo–Dakar Highway.

== Ports and harbours ==
=== Mediterranean Sea ===
(west to east)

- Zuwara
- Tripoli
- Khoms
- Misrata
- Ra's Lanuf
- Brega
- Benghazi
- Derna
- Tobruk

== Merchant marine ==
Total:

- 17 ships (1000 GT or over) 96,062 GT/88,760 tonnes deadweight (DWT)

By type:

- Cargo 9, liquified gas 3, passenger/cargo 2, petroleum tanker 1, roll on/roll off 2
- Foreign-owned: 4 (Kuwait 1, Turkey 2, UAE 1) (2005)

== Airports ==
139 (2005) Most international flights arrive in and through Tripoli International Airport.

=== Airports – with paved runways ===
Total: 59
over 3,047 m: 23
2,438 to 3,047 m: 6
1,524 to 2,437 m: 23
914 to 1,523 m: 5
under 914 m: 2 (2005)

=== Airports – with unpaved runways ===
Total: 80
over 3,047 m: 5
2,438 to 3,047 m: 2
1,524 to 2,437 m: 14
914 to 1,523 m: 41
under 914 m: 18 (2008)

== See also ==
- List of bridges in Libya
