= Timeline of Tripoli =

Timeline of Tripoli may refer to:

- Timeline of Tripoli, Lebanon, a city in Lebanon
- Timeline of Tripoli, Libya, a city in Libya
- Timeline of the County of Tripoli, a crusader state in what is now Lebanon
