= Port of Tobruk =

Port of Tobruk ميناء طبرق
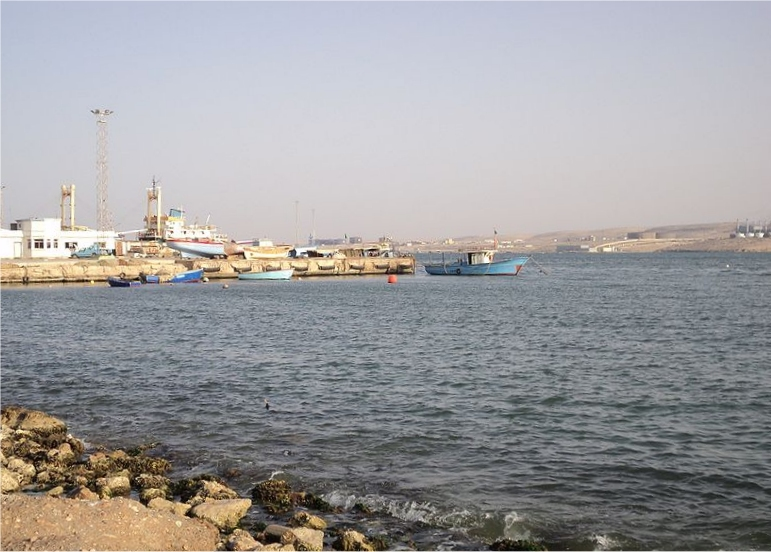
- The port of Tobruk prior to the Libyan Civil War
- Interactive map of Port of Tobruk ميناء طبرق

Location
- Country: Libya
- Location: Tobruk
- Coordinates: 32.078°N 23.983°E
- UN/LOCODE: LYTOB

Details
- Opened: 1967
- Owned by: Socialist Ports Company
- Type of harbour: Coastal Breakwater
- Size: 1,000,000 m^{2} (11,000,000 ft^{2})
- No. of piers: 13
- Anchorage depth: 14–15.2 m (45 ft 11 in – 49 ft 10 in)
- Cargo pier depth: 4.9–6.1 m (16 ft 1 in – 20 ft 0 in)
- Oil terminal depth: 7.1–9.1 m (23 ft 4 in – 29 ft 10 in)

Statistics
- Vessel arrivals: 120
- Annual cargo tonnage: 600000 tons
- Dock Density: 1025
- Main export: crude oil
- Oil traffic: 220000 barrels
- Website; Socialist Ports Company

The Port of Tobruk (Arabic: ميناء طبرق) is a port located at Tobruk, Libya. Opened in 1986, it is located in Eastern Libya near the Egyptian border - about 450 km (280 mi) east of Benghazi. The entrance to the main channel into the port is between Tobruk point ( 32°04′N 024°01′E ) and the point of Marsa Ummash Shawush.

== History ==
Tobruk was formerly the historic settlement of Antipyrgos, offering a major harbor for the Hellenic states. The port has never been systematically surveyed for archeological findings to evaluate the use of the port during this time.

During the Italo-Turkish War in 1911, Tobruk was the landing point for 35,000 Italian soldiers under the command of Carlo Canvey.

During World War II, the port, one of the most valuable deep water ports in North Africa, was fortified by 12,000 British and Indian troops and 14,000 Australian troops. Starting in April 1941 and ending in November 1941, German general Erwin Rommel surrounded the port besieging the troops resulting in the Siege of Tobruk.

During the 1960s, high viscosity oil from the Sarir field was piped to Tobruk for loading on vessels, because the oil was not safe to load at sea. The port has been constructed by late 1966. The first oil cargo had been exported on January 10, 1967. It had been run by BP until 1971, when the Libyan branch of the company was nationalized.

As a result of the Libyan Civil War, the port was temporarily closed due to clashes between protestors and government forces and reopened on 28 February 2011 for oil exports. The port re-opened soon after the civil war ended. As of August 2014, all port traffic from the Port of Benghazi will be diverted to the port of Tobruk due to the closure of the port in Benghazi as a direct result of the sustained Post-civil war violence in Libya.

== Operations ==
It requires a pilot to enter the port. The port has ten anchorages, with a six-vessel capacity each. As of 2010, the port had three cargo handling cranes, one with a 50-80 ton capacity and two with 30-40 ton capacity.
