= Port of Tripoli =

Sea port in Tripoli, Libya

Coordinates: 32°54′17″N 13°11′36″E

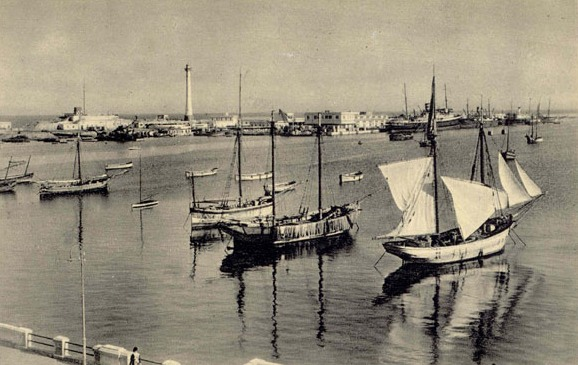
The port of Tripoli in the 1930s

The Port of Tripoli is the principal sea port in Tripoli, the capital of Libya, and one of the oldest ports in the Mediterranean. The port serves general cargo, bulk cargo and passengers.

== History ==
In 1911, Italy claimed the need to protect its citizens who lived in the Port of Tripoli. It declared war against the Ottomans, saying it would annex the city. A naval battle fought at Prevesa, Greece, ended in the destruction of three Ottoman ships and the recognition of Italian sovereignty over the Port of Tripoli. The Italians controlled the region until 1943. British forces governed the area after World War II until Libyan independence in 1951 World Ports History: Tripoli

Since Roman Libya the port of Tripoli (then called Oea) was one of the main in coastal Mediterranean Africa. In the Middle Ages the port fell into disuse, but under Ottoman rule started to grow in importance. In the late 1920s, the Italian colonial authorities created the port that exists today. Other important infrastructures added in the 1930s were the enlargement of the port of Tripoli with the addition of a seaplane facility. The port was severely damaged during WWII.

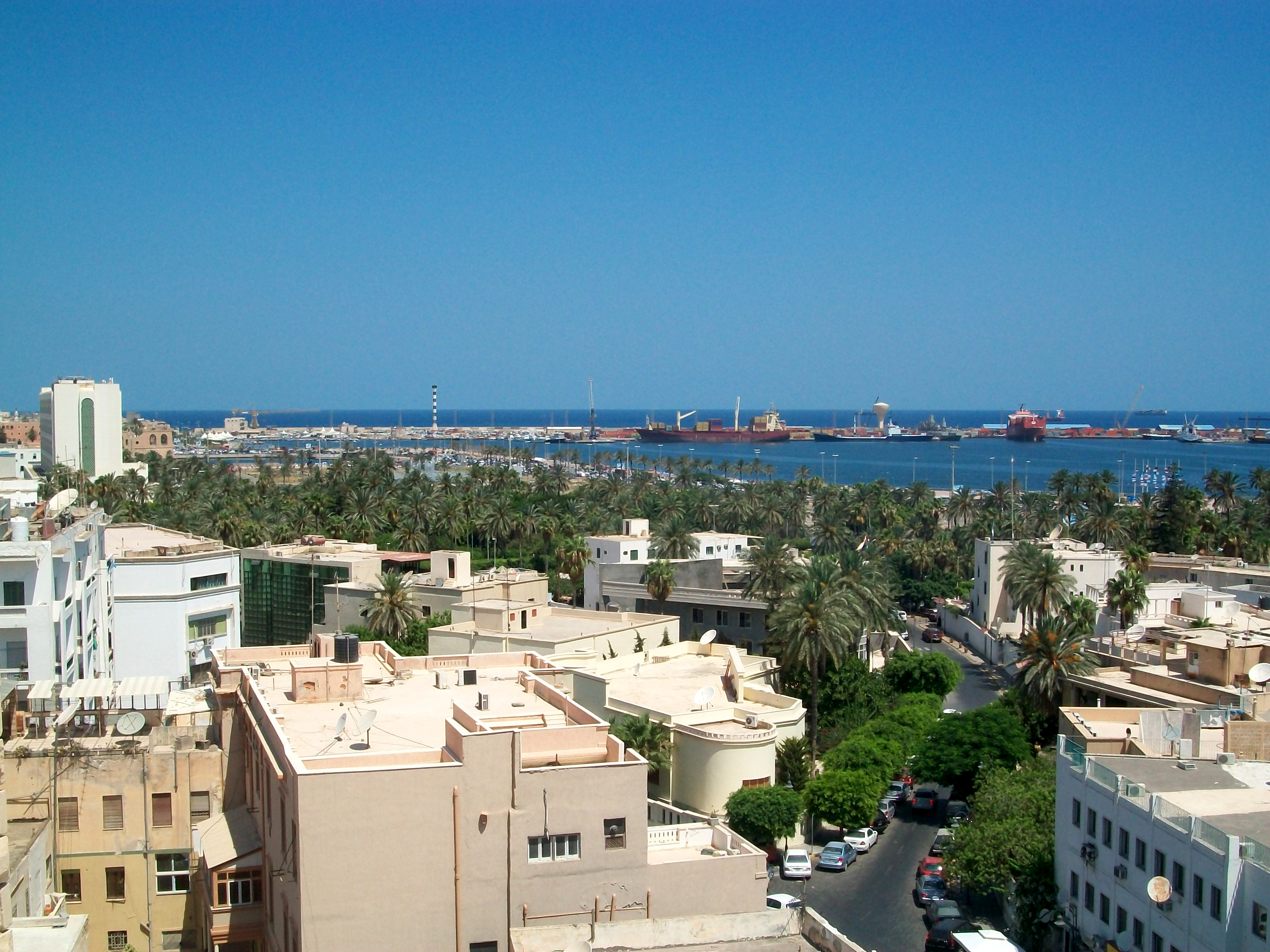
View of the Maydan Jazair Park from the Safwa Hotel on Baghdad Street in the Italian quarter of Libya's capital Tripoli. To the left of the park is the Grand Hotel and in the background is the Port of Tripoli

== Features ==
In the 1970s the port was greatly improved: now the port of Tripoli contains many cargo terminals, and is capable of servicing many ships at once. The port also features a yacht club, and a fishing wharf.

Libya has had a long history of port congestion. In 1977 the average waiting time for ships to be unloaded in Tripoli harbor was 24 days. Consequently, since the mid-1970s, port improvements have been a top priority for the government. These improvements raised Libya's total dry cargo handling capacity from 10.5 million tons in 1976 to 13.7 million tons in 1980. In 1985 major cargo-handling ports were located at Tripoli, Benghazi, Tobruk, and Qasr Ahmad (near Misratah). Projects underway at Tripoli in 1985 were designed to raise the port's handling capacity to 12.5 million tons a year. Library of Congress Country study: Libya

The "Socialist Ports Company" is the port authority responsible for managing and operating the Port of Tripoli, which handled general and bulk cargoes and passengers.

Protected by two breakwaters of 2000 and 700 meters, the harbor covers about 300 hectares. About 600 huge vessels visited the Port of Tripoli each year until the end of Gaddafi regime. The port can accommodate vessels up to 190 meters long with a maximum draft of 10.7 meters.

== See also ==
- Tripoli
- Port of Benghazi
- Tripolitania
