= Tripoli clashes (mid-October 2011) =

Second Tripoli clashes
- Part of First Libyan Civil War
Date	14 October 2011
Location	Tripoli, Libya
Result	Anti-Gaddafi victory

Belligerents
(Libya) Anti-Gaddafi forces: National Liberation Army	(History of Libya under Muammar Gaddafi) Gaddafi Loyalists: Local Insurgents

Strength
Unknown	20–80

Casualties and losses
1 killed, 60 wounded	2 killed, 10–15 captured

Clashes broke out in the Libyan capital of Tripoli on 14 October 2011 when a group of Gaddafi loyalists rose up against the National Transitional Council, leading to a firefight in the city's Abu Salim district as well as smaller clashes elsewhere in the city.

== Background ==
Tripoli, the Libyan capital, fell to rebel forces in late August 2011. The rebel forces were mostly met well by the local populace who seemed glad to be rid of Gaddafi, though it was clear that not all of the citizens of Tripoli supported the NTC. This was the first and so far only action by loyalists in the city since it came under the control of anti-regime forces.

It was the third conflict to erupt in Tripoli since the outbreak of the Libyan Civil War, the first being the February 2011 Tripoli clashes, the second being the aforementioned battle for control of the city.

== Battle ==
The clashes were reported to have started when a group of roughly 80 of Gaddafi's loyalists raised the ousted leader's green flag, even going as far as to raise the flag over a street, enraging opposition forces, which led to an exchange of fire. It was unclear who fired first but the situation quickly escalated.

After the loyalist protesters dissipated, NTC forces searched the area, many of them discovering weapons caches. Soon after that, loyalist snipers opened fire, causing a large-scale gun battle between them and NTC forces. NTC fighters came in armed pickup trucks and began firing at the loyalists. There were reportedly shots fired by heavy machine guns on both sides. In the confusion, about 30 NTC fighters were hit by friendly fire. Two Gaddafi loyalists and one NTC fighter were confirmed dead in the fighting. After that, the uprising was quickly quelled with several of the loyalists killed or captured.

The conflict was mostly confined to the Abu Salim district, which is known to be home to loyalists, although small clashes happened in other parts of the city, none of which resulted in any serious casualties.

== Aftermath ==
Once the clashes were brought under control, the council set up roadblocks in and around the city, as well as trying to root out loyalists remaining in the city. NTC forces also made their presence known by randomly firing their weapons in the air from time to time.
