= That El Emad Towers =

- That El Emad Towers and central business district

- Location within Libya

General information
- Type: Government-use
- Location: Tripoli, Libya
- Coordinates: 32.8947°N 13.1672°E
- Construction started: began in early 1984
- Opening: 1990

Height
- Roof: 74 m

Technical details
- Floor count: 18 (Tower 1, Tower 2, Tower 3, Tower 4, Tower 5)

That El Emad Towers (Arabic: أبراج ذات العماد) are 5 towers in Tripoli, Libya. It is located in the El Saddi district of Tripoli in the downtown area. The building began construction in early 1984 and opened in 1990. It was built by a South Korean Daewoo Engineering & Construction. The complex is made up of 5 towers each having 18 floors and full view of the sea. It was built during Muammar Gaddafi's government.
