= 23rd July Lake =

Lake in Libya

- Lake Benghazi
- بحيرة 23 يوليو (Arabic)
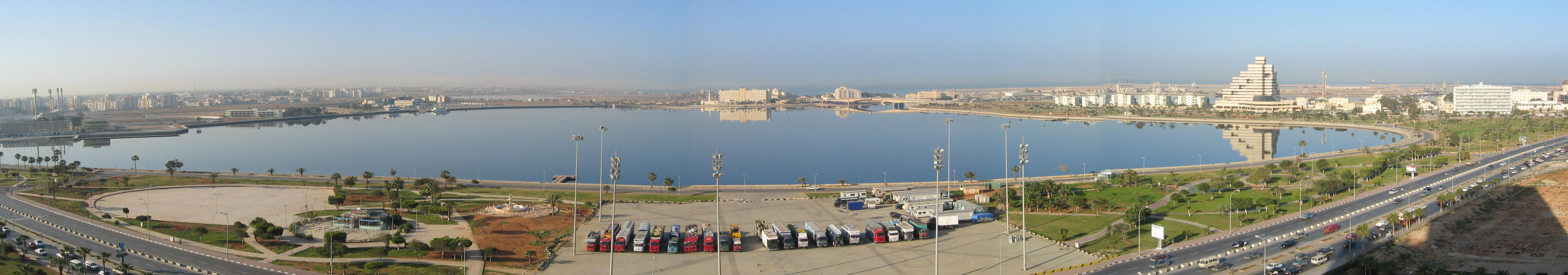

- Location within Libya
- Coordinates: 32°6′15″N 20°3′50″E
- Basin countries: Libya
- Surface area: 100 ha (250 acres)
- Max. depth: 5 m (16 ft)

The 23rd July Lake (Arabic: بحيرة بنغازي أو بحيرة 23 يوليو) is a lagoon located between Benghazi's downtown, and the Mediterranean Port of Benghazi. It covers an area of approximately 100 hectares (250 acres) with a maximum depth of 5 metres (16 ft).
