= Giuliana Bridge =

Bridge in Benghazi

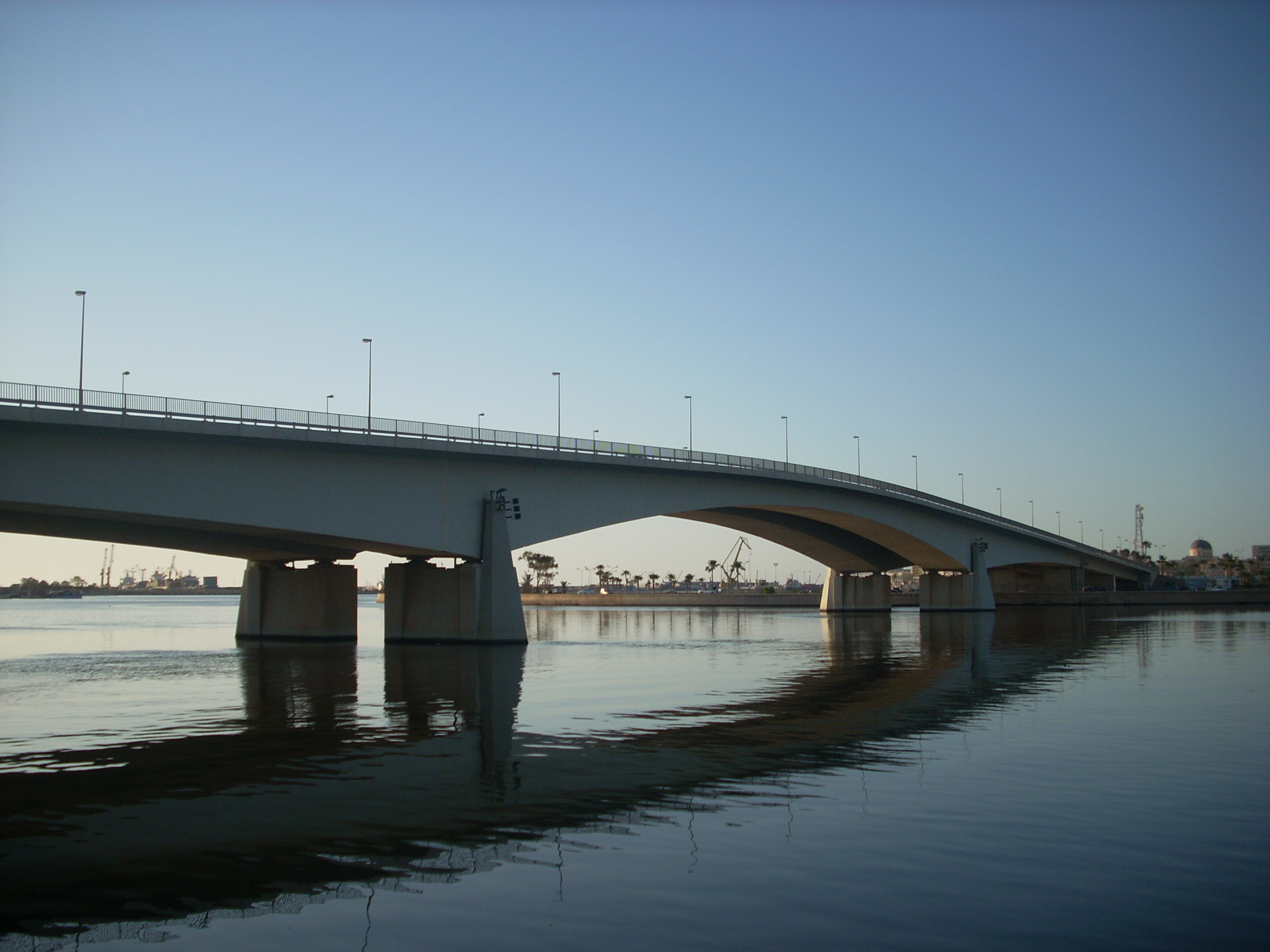
Giuliana Bridge

Giuliana Bridge is a box girder / haunched girder bridge constructed from prestressed concrete in Benghazi, Libya. It has a three-span main structure which was originally built in the 1970s but was rehabilitated in 2005 by Bilfinger Berger.

== See also ==
- List of bridges in Libya
