= Tobruk =

Tobruk طبرق Tobruch
- City
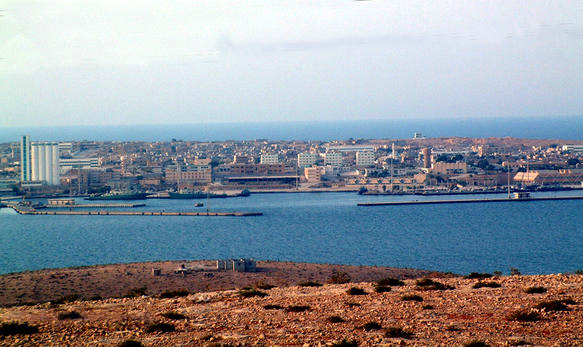
- Panorama of Tobruk in 2002

- Location in Libya
- Coordinates: 32°4′34″N 23°57′41″E
- Country: Libya
- Region: Cyrenaica
- District: Butnan

Government
  - Mayor: Faraj Hashem Bu Al-Khattabiya
- Elevation: 5 m (16 ft)

Population (2011)
  - Total: 120,000
- Time zone: UTC+2 (EET)
- License Plate Code: 14

Tobruk (Note: Sometimes transliterated as Tobruck or Tubruk.) (/təˈbrʊk, toʊˈbrʊk/ tə-BRUUK, toh-BRUUK; Arabic: طبرق, romanized: Ṭubruq; Italian: Tobruch) (Note: Ancient Greek: Ἀντίπυργος, romanized: Antípyrgos; Latin: Antipyrgus.) is a port city on Libya's eastern Mediterranean coast, near the border with Egypt. It is the capital of the Butnan District (formerly Tobruk District) and has a population of 120,000 (2011 est.).

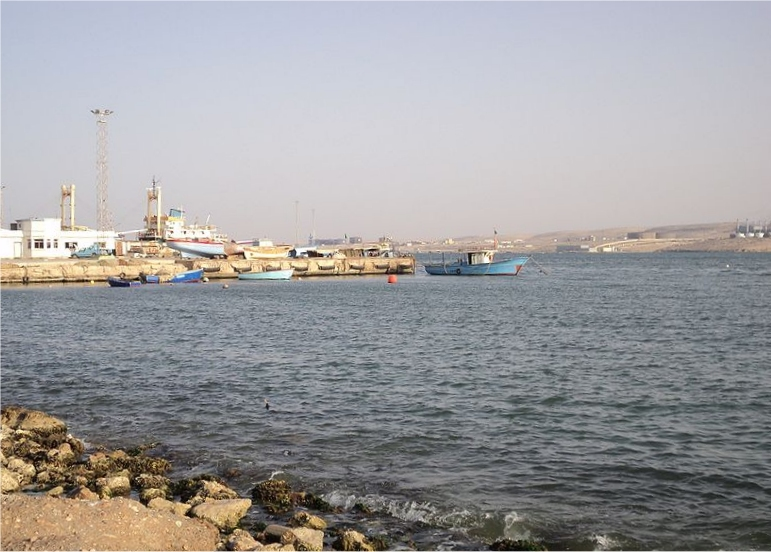
Port of Tobruk in 2011

Tobruk was the site of an ancient Greek colony and, later, of a Roman fortress guarding the frontier of Cyrenaica. Over the centuries, Tobruk also served as a waystation along the coastal caravan route. By 1911, Tobruk had become an Italian military post.

During World War II, Allied forces, mainly the Australian 6th Division, took Tobruk on 22 January 1941. The Australian 9th Division ("The Rats of Tobruk") pulled back to Tobruk to avoid encirclement after actions at Er Regima and Mechili and reached Tobruk on 9 April 1941. There prolonged fighting followed, against a siege by German and Italian forces.

Although the siege was lifted by Operation Crusader in November 1941, a renewed offensive by Axis forces under Erwin Rommel the following year resulted in Tobruk being captured in June 1942. It was held by the Axis forces until November 1942, when it was recaptured by the Allies.

Rebuilt after World War II, Tobruk was later expanded during the 1960s to include a port terminal linked by an oil pipeline to the Sarir oil field.

King Idris of Libya had his palace at Bab Zaytun. Tobruk was traditionally a stronghold of the Senussi royal dynasty and one of the first to rebel against Muammar Gaddafi in the Arab Spring.

== Geography ==
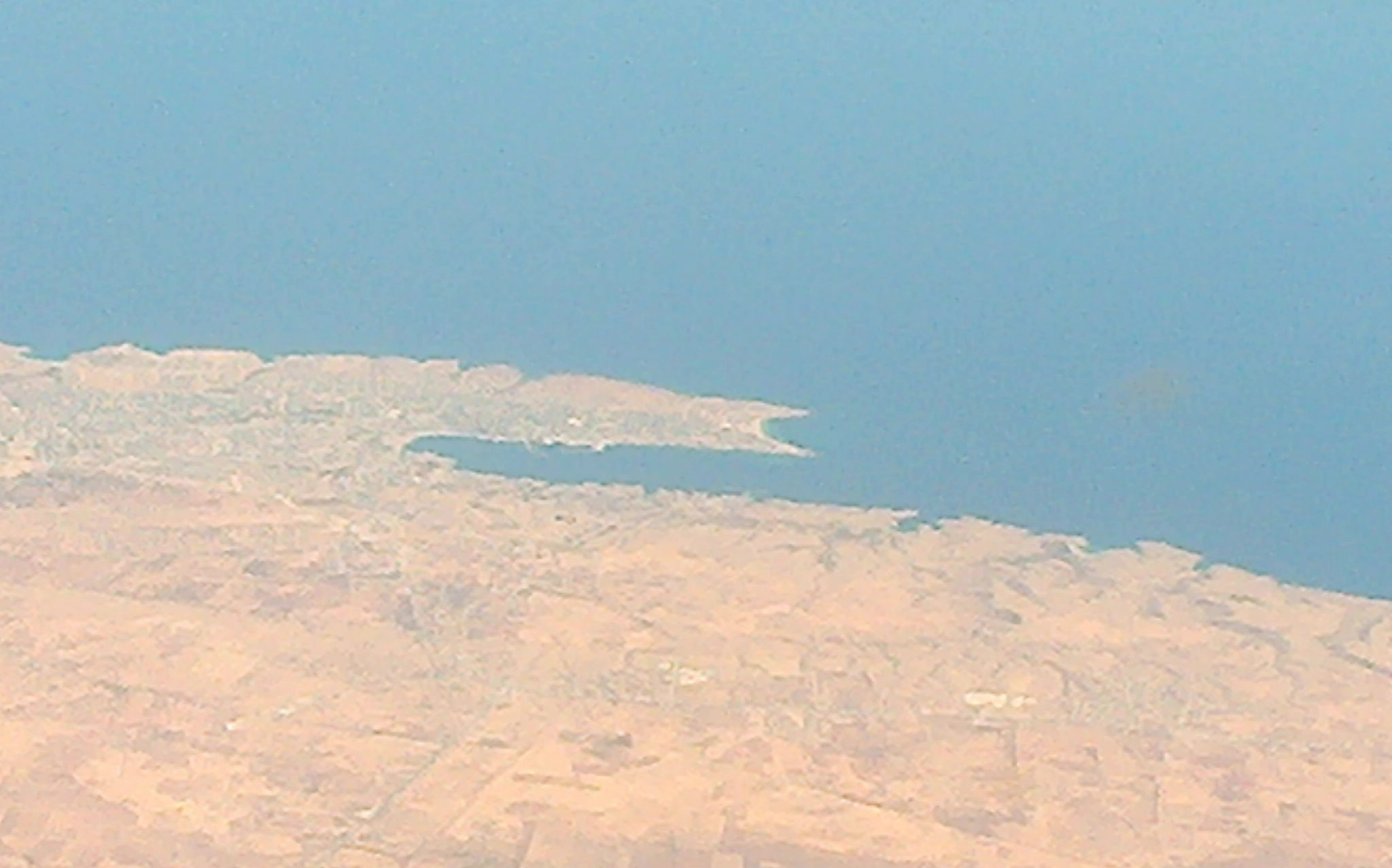
An aerial image of Tobruk's harbour.

Tobruk has a strong, naturally protected deep harbour. It is probably the best natural port in northern Africa, although due to the lack of important nearby land sites it is certainly not the most popular. The city is effectively surrounded by a desert lightly populated with nomadic herdsmen who travel from oasis to oasis.

There are many escarpments (cliffs) to the south of Tobruk, as is common across Cyrenaica, the eastern half of Libya. These escarpments generally have their high sides to the south and their low sides (dip slopes) to the north. This constitutes a substantial physical barrier between the north and south of Libya in the Tobruk area.

Previously, Tobruk was some 470 km (290 mi) from Benghazi through the Libyan Coastal Highway, but this distance was shortened to 450 km (280 mi) after the construction of the Charruba–Timimi Road between the years 1975 and 1985. Construction of the Tobruk–Ajdabiya Road reduced the distance between those two cities from 620 km (390 mi) to about 410 km (250 mi).

Because it is approximately 150 km (93 mi) away from Egypt by land, Tobruk is also an important hub for merchants from both Egypt and Libya, and for travellers between the two countries as well as those from Bayda and Derna.

Tobruk suffers a serious saltwater intrusion problem. A factory for the desalination of sea water has been built there.

=== Climate ===
Tobruk features a hot desert climate (BWh according to the Köppen climate classification.) However, its maritime location allows it to receive significantly more precipitation than areas further inland in the Sahara desert.

Climate data for Tobruk (1991-2020)
Month	Jan	Feb	Mar	Apr	May	Jun	Jul	Aug	Sep	Oct	Nov	Dec	Year
Record high °C (°F)	27.5 (81.5)	34.5 (94.1)	39.5 (103.1)	42.6 (108.7)	43.0 (109.4)	44.6 (112.3)	44.7 (112.5)	43.8 (110.8)	42.6 (108.7)	40.5 (104.9)	34.0 (93.2)	29.8 (85.6)	44.7 (112.5)
Mean daily maximum °C (°F)	17.6 (63.7)	18.4 (65.1)	20.5 (68.9)	23.0 (73.4)	25.3 (77.5)	27.7 (81.9)	29.4 (84.9)	30.1 (86.2)	29.4 (84.9)	27.2 (81.0)	23.4 (74.1)	18.4 (65.1)	24.2 (75.6)
Daily mean °C (°F)	13.7 (56.7)	14.3 (57.7)	16.1 (61.0)	18.5 (65.3)	21.3 (70.3)	24.1 (75.4)	26.1 (79.0)	26.9 (80.4)	26.0 (78.8)	23.3 (73.9)	19.3 (66.7)	15.3 (59.5)	20.4 (68.7)
Mean daily minimum °C (°F)	9.8 (49.6)	10.1 (50.2)	11.7 (53.1)	14.0 (57.2)	17.2 (63.0)	20.6 (69.1)	22.9 (73.2)	23.8 (74.8)	22.6 (72.7)	19.7 (67.5)	15.2 (59.4)	11.2 (52.2)	16.6 (61.9)
Record low °C (°F)	2.1 (35.8)	0.8 (33.4)	5.0 (41.0)	4.5 (40.1)	4.8 (40.6)	12.0 (53.6)	11.0 (51.8)	15.4 (59.7)	11.8 (53.2)	10.5 (50.9)	6.6 (43.9)	3.4 (38.1)	0.8 (33.4)
Average precipitation mm (inches)	46.5 (1.83)	30.3 (1.19)	9.7 (0.38)	3.1 (0.12)	7.5 (0.30)	0 (0)	0 (0)	0 (0)	1.6 (0.06)	15.6 (0.61)	15.6 (0.61)	43.1 (1.70)	173.0 (6.81)
Average precipitation days (≥ 1.0 mm)	5.9	4.2	2.0	0.8	0.6	0.1	0	0	0.4	2.0	2.7	5.2	23.9
Average relative humidity (%)	70.4	67.9	67.2	68.0	71.2	75.0	76.8	77.6	71.9	69.8	68.9	68.7	71.1
Mean monthly sunshine hours	232.5	299.5	288.3	246.0	306.9	348.0	350.3	331.7	288.0	257.3	285.0	179.8	3,413.3
Source 1: NOAA
Source 2: Deutscher Wetterdienst (Sunshine 1996–2015), Weather Online

== History ==
=== Ancient ===
An Ancient Greek agricultural colony, Antipyrgus (Ancient Greek: Ἀντίπυργος) was once on the site of modern Tobruk, and the ancient name is still occasionally in use. The name roughly meant "across from Pyrgos", referring to a location in Crete across the Mediterranean Sea from Antipyrgos. In the Roman era, the town became a Roman fortress guarding the Cyrenaican frontier. With the spread of Christianity, Antipyrgus became an episcopal see. Only one of its ancient bishops is known by name: Aemilianus, who took part in the Second Council of Constantinople in 553. No longer a residential bishopric, Antipyrgus is today listed by the Catholic Church as a titular see. Later the site became a way station on the caravan route that ran along the coast.

=== World War II ===
At the beginning of World War II, Libya was an Italian colony and Tobruk became the site of important battles between the Allies and Axis powers. Tobruk was strategically important to the conquest of Eastern Libya, then the province of Cyrenaica, (Note: On 1 January 1934, Tripolitania, Cyrenaica and Fezzan were united as the Italian colony of Libya. However, during World War II these names continued to be used.) for several reasons.

==== Strategic importance ====
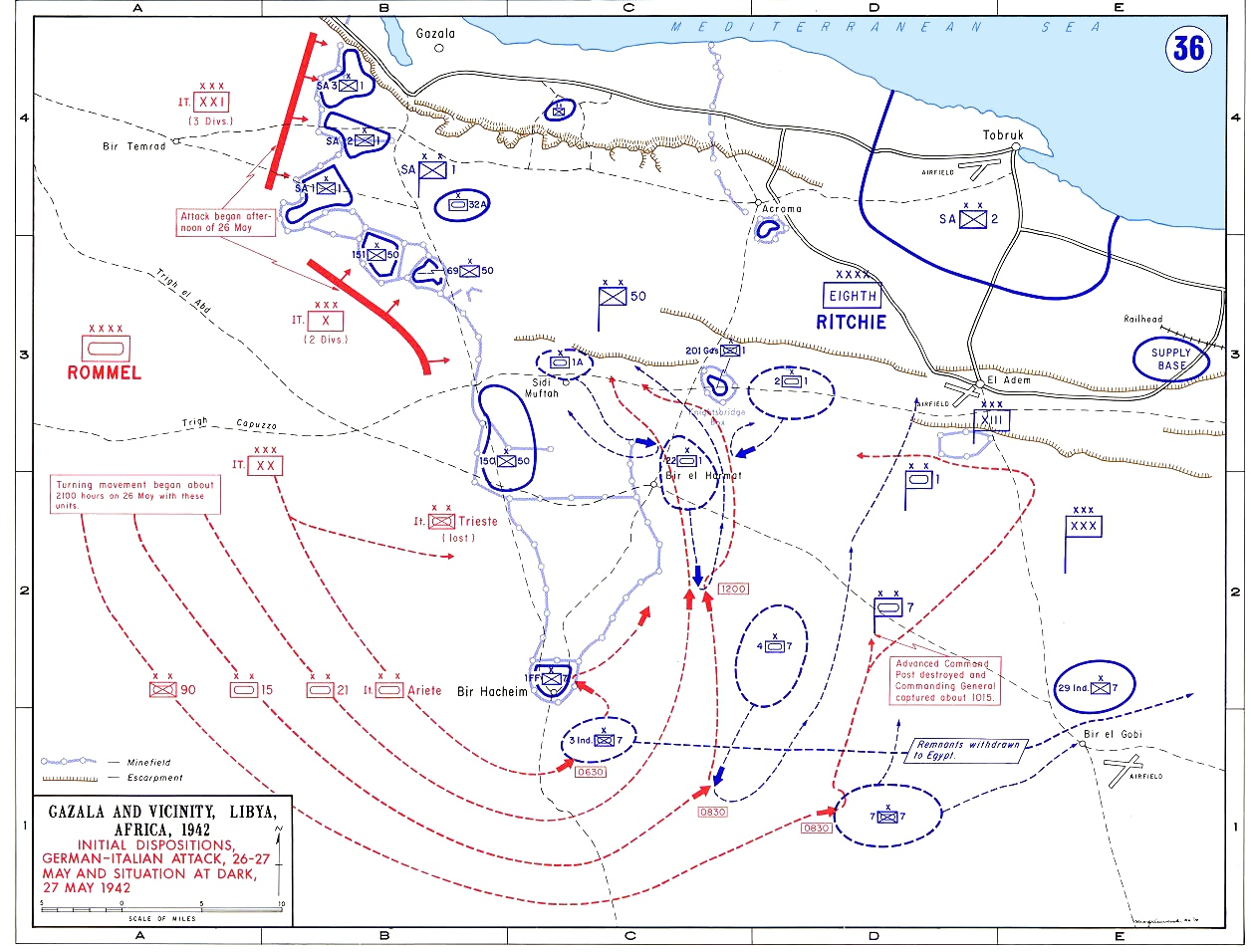
The Battle of Gazala in May 1942, which was fought in the vicinity of Tobruk

Tobruk had a deep, natural, and protected harbour, which meant that even if the port were bombed, ships would still be able to anchor there and be safe from squalls, so the port could never be rendered wholly useless regardless of military bombardment. This was of critical importance, as it made Tobruk an excellent place to supply a desert warfare campaign. It was also heavily fortified by the Italians prior to their invasion of Egypt in November 1940.

In addition to these prepared fortifications, there were a number of escarpments and cliffs to the south of Tobruk, providing substantial physical barriers to any advance on the port over land. Tobruk was also on a peninsula, allowing it to be defended by a minimal number of troops, which the Allies used to their advantage when the port was under siege. An attacker could not simply bypass the defenders, for if they did, the besieged would sally forth and cut off the nearby supply lines of the attacker, spoiling their advance.

But Tobruk was also strategically significant, due to its location with regard to the remainder of Cyrenaica. Attackers from the east who had secured Tobruk could then advance through the desert to Benghazi, cutting off all enemy troops along the coast, such as those at Derna. This advance would be protected from counterattack, due to escarpments that were quite difficult for a military force to climb, running generally from Tobruk to Suluq. Due to the importance of maintaining supply in the desert, getting cut off in this area was disastrous. Therefore, whoever held both Suluq and Tobruk controlled the majority of Cyrenaica.

Finally, 24 km (15 mi) south of the port was the largest airfield in eastern Libya. This was significant due to the importance of air power in desert warfare.

==== Italian advance ====
Italian forces (and their native Libyan allies—about two divisions of the latter) invaded Egypt in early September 1940 but halted their advance after a week and dug in at Sidi Barrani. In early December, British Empire forces—an armoured division and two infantry divisions—launched a counterstrike codenamed Operation Compass. The Italians had previously invaded Albania and occupied part of the south of France, and had now made a military incursion into a British protectorate.

==== British capture of Tobruk ====
The counterstrike involved the British pocketing two of the Italian camps against the Mediterranean, forcing their surrender. This led to a general Italian retreat to El Agheila. Tobruk was captured by British, Australian and Indian forces on 22 January 1941.

Italy called on her German ally, which sent an army corps, under the name Deutsches Afrika Korps (DAK). Italy also sent several more divisions to Libya. These forces, under Lieutenant-General Erwin Rommel, drove the Allies back across Cyrenaica to the Egyptian border, leaving Tobruk isolated and under siege. The defenders of the fortress consisted of the Australian 9th Division, the Australian 18th Brigade and some British tanks and artillery. They were later reinforced and replaced by the British 70th Infantry Division, Polish Independent Carpathian Rifle Brigade, a Czechoslovak battalion and a British tank brigade. The siege lasted until December, when Operation Crusader pushed the DAK and Italians back out of Cyrenaica.

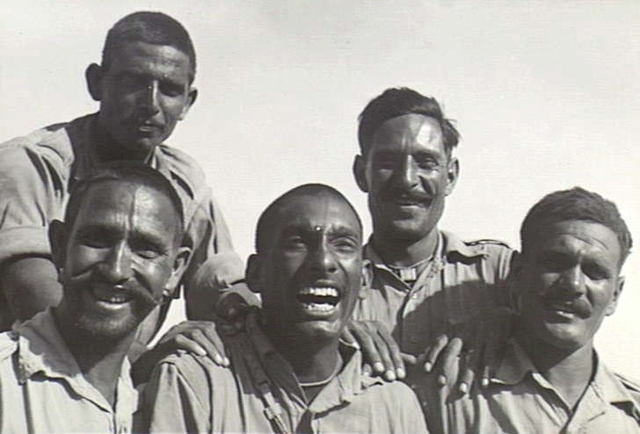
Smiling Indian Soldiers in Tobruk 1941

==== German capture of Tobruk ====
Rommel's second offensive took place in May and June 1942. Tobruk was taken in an outflanking attack on 21 June 1942, capturing the largest number of British Commonwealth troops after the fall of Singapore earlier in the year, where over 80,000 were captured. Rommel was promoted to Generalfeldmarschall, shortly thereafter and was the youngest in the Wehrmacht Heer to achieve this rank. The following units were deployed in Tobruk on 20 June 1942, and most of them were captured by the Axis forces:

- 2nd South African Infantry Division
- 4th Royal Tank Regiment
- 7th Royal Tank Regiment
- 3rd Battalion, Coldstream Guards
- 1st Battalion, Sherwood Foresters
- 1st Battalion, Worcestershire Regiment
- 2nd Battalion, Queen's Own Cameron Highlanders
- 2nd Battalion, 5th Mahratta Light Infantry
- 2nd Battalion, 7th Gurkha Rifles
- 67 Medium Regiment, Royal Artillery
- 68 Medium Regiment, Royal Artillery
- 25th Field Regiment, Royal Artillery

==== British Commando raid ====
A British raid on Tobruk on 13–14 September 1942, codenamed Operation Agreement, intended to destroy port facilities and stores being used to support the Axis forces further west. Special forces approached from across the desert while Commandos attacked from the sea. A preparatory air raid by RAF heavy bombers served only to alert the Italian and German defenders. The special forces were unable to silence the coastal artillery batteries and the seaborne assault had to be abandoned after some of the Commandos had been landed in the wrong place. The retiring vessels were then attacked from the air. The British sustained almost 800 casualties, together with a cruiser, two destroyers and several smaller ships and boats.

==== British recapture ====
Tobruk remained in Axis hands until 11 November 1942, when the Allies captured it after the Second Battle of El Alamein. It remained in Allied hands thereafter. Although not as much a reason for its strategic significance, the British built a rail line from El Alamein to Tobruk during the course of the war. This rail line was significant both for purposes of supply and as a sense of pride to the Allied troops, as the rail line was built through a little-populated, inhospitable desert.

=== Libyan Civil Wars ===
At the outset of the First Libyan Civil War, the city quickly came under the control of the NTC. In September 2014 the internationally recognized government of Libya relocated to a Greek car ferry in Tobruk harbor. A rival New General National Congress parliament continued to operate in Tripoli. In October 2014 they again re-located, to a hotel named Dar al-Salam also known as the Al Masira Hotel in Tobruk. In November 2014 that government was declared illegal by Libya's highest court.

== Notable people ==
Professor Omar El Barasi (b. 1951), who once managed the Libyan branch of Society of Petroleum Engineers, and later became a deputy of Libya PM Abdurrahim El-Keib is from Tobruk and gained his doctorate in petroleum engineering from Waseda University, Japan.

Eman al-Obeidi, a Libyan woman who was abused by the Gaddafi government during the First Libyan Civil War, is from Tobruk.

Omar Mukhtar was born in Zanjhur, near Tobruk.

== Transportation ==
The city is served by Tobruk Airport, with two major domestic airlines serving it.

== See also ==
- List of cities in Libya
- Railway stations in Libya
- Knightsbridge War Cemetery WW2 British Commonwealth Cemetery
