= Port of Benghazi =

Port in Benghazi, Libya

Coordinates: 32°6′33″N 20°2′51″E

Location of the Port of Benghazi in Libya

The Port of Benghazi is a major seaport in the city of Benghazi, Libya, on the Mediterranean Sea coast within the Gulf of Sidra.

== History ==
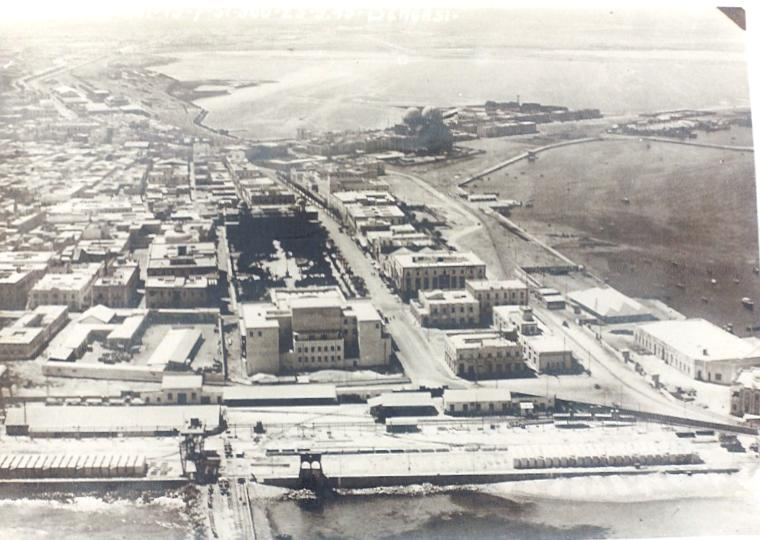
Old Benghazi, Libya, during the Italian colonial period

A natural seaport, it was founded as Euesperides by the ancient Greeks of Cyrenaica in the 6th century BC. After passing it to the Egyptian pharaoh Ptolemy III, it was renamed Berenice to honor his wife. The city's current name honors benefactor Ghazi.

From the third century onwards, it surpassed Barce and Cyrene as the region's main center. Under the kings of Libya, it was a joint capital with Tripoli, resulting today in state level institutions being located in the second city. This resulted in a rivalry, which being located in different tribal districts, was only intensified.

Following a period of slow decline, it was redeveloped after occupation by the Italians in 1912, until the start of the World War II Western Desert campaign from 1942. This resulted in it becoming a hub in the eastern part of the Italian Libya Railways, connecting it inland to Soluch and Barce. The port was subject to heavy damage in World War II, as it moved between Axis and Allied control five times. The British Army finally took the Port of Benghazi in 1942, during the Battle of El Agheila.

== Present ==
Today the Port of Benghazi is run and owned by the state-owned Socialist Ports Company. It has been developed as a modern port with associated and linked manufacturing and industrial facilities.

The port facility itself serves general, bulk cargoes and containers, handled through eight transit sheds covering 17,500 square metres (188,000 sq ft). Major exports include wool, hides, sheep and goats, hair fabrics, and wool rugs. Important imports include foodstuffs, textiles, pottery, tobacco, and chemical products.

Industries developed within the port include oil refining, food and salt processing, cement manufacturing, fishing, brewing, and tanning. The port is also the location of one of the biggest water desalination plants in the world.

=== Facilities ===
Accommodating vessels of up to 167.6 metres (550 ft) long with drafts of up to 8.53 metres (28.0 ft), the port has six main berths:

- Inner harbour: 3 berths at Rasif Libya Wharf and Rasif Juliana Wharf, total 494 metres (1,621 ft) in length. Can handle roll-on/roll-off, with two dedicated tanker berths:
  - Rasif Libya, depth of 4.8 metres (16 ft)
  - Rasif Juliana, depth of 3.1 metres (10 ft). An extension buoy can handle vessels to 107 metres (351 ft) with drafts of up to 7.3 metres (24 ft)
- Outer harbor: 3 berths, 778 metres (2,552 ft) in length, depth of 8.2 metres (27 ft)

Work is underway to add 3,000 metres (9,800 ft) of additional quay and related facilities.

=== Access ===
The two approaches to the port are from the southwest and north. Strong westerly winds during the winter cause heavy seas, that make anchorage in the 0.6 metres (2 ft 0 in) tidal range dangerous.

== Transport access ==
After the railways developed by the Italians fell into disrepair, the major transport routes to and from the port are either accessed by sea or major dual carriageway roads. Air access is via Benina International Airport.
