= Abyar concentration camp =

Italian concentration camp established in the Italian colony of Libya

Coordinates: 32.186°N 20.589°E

The Abyar concentration camp was an Italian concentration camp established in Abyar, Libya in the Italian colony of Libya during the Pacification of Libya that occurred from 1928 to 1932. The camp is recorded as having a population of 3,123 people.

The conditions of the prisoners were considered "normal" by the Red Cross in 1932.

== See also ==
- List of Italian concentration camps
- Italian concentration camps in Libya
- Italian Libya
- Libyan genocide
- Second Italo-Senussi War
