= List of Italian concentration camps =

Italian concentration camps include camps from the Italian colonial wars in Africa as well as camps for the civilian population from areas occupied by Italy during World War II. Memory of both camps were subjected to "historical amnesia". The repression of memory led to historical revisionism in Italy and in 2003 the Italian media published Italian prime minister Silvio Berlusconi's statement that Benito Mussolini only "used to send people on vacation".

== Colonial wars ==
There were numerous war crimes conducted by the Italian Army in the colonies. In Cyrenaica alone between 1929 and 1933, over 40,000 people were killed and 80,000 locked up in concentration camps, out of a total population of just 193,000. According to the historian Ilan Pappé, the fascist regime between 1928 and 1932 killed half the Bedouin population either directly or by starvation in the fields. According to the historian Angelo Del Boca, in 1933, of the approximately 100,000 Libyans deported from Jebel Achdar and Marmarica, more than 40,000 died in the camps.

Name of the camp	Location of camp	Present-day country	Date of establishment	Date of disestablishment	Estimated number of prisoners	Estimated number of deaths
Nocra	Nocra	Eritrea	1930s	1941		1,500
Abyar	Abyar	Libya	1930	1933	3,123	
Agedabia	Ajdabiya	Libya	1930	1933	10,000	1,500
El Agheila	El Agheila	Libya	1930	1933	10,900	
Marsa Brega	Brega	Libya	1930	1933	21,117	
Sid Ahmed el Maghrun	El Magrun	Libya	1930	1933	13,050	4,500
Soluch	Suluq	Libya	1930	1933	20,123	5,500
Derna	Derna	Libya	1930	1933	145	
Apollonia	Apollonia	Libya	1930	1933	1,354	
Barce	Barce	Libya	1930	1933	538	
Driana	Driana	Libya	1930	1933	225	
Nufilia	Nufilia	Libya	1930	1933	375	
Danane	Mogadishu	Somalia	1935	1941	6,000	3,175
Total						~44 675

== World War II ==
Name of the camp	Location of locality	Present-day country	Date of establishment	Date of disestablishment	Estimated number of prisoners	Estimated number of deaths
Bakar	Bakar	Croatia	31 December 1942	1 July 1943	893	100–120
Bolzano	South Tyrol	Italy	September 8, 1943	April 29 and May 3, 1945	11,000	
Buq Buq	Buq Buq (بقبق)	Egypt	Late August 1942	November 6, 1942	350	0
Campagna	Salerno	Italy	15 June 1940	19 September 1943		
Chiesanuova	Padua	Italy	June 1942			
Ferramonti di Tarsia	Cosenza	Italy	summer 1940	4 September 1943	3,800	
Giado	Jadu, Libya	Libya	January 1942	24 January 1943	3,146	564
Gonars	Palmanova	Italy	March 1942	8 September 1943	7,000	453; >500
Mamula	Mamula island	Montenegro	30 May 1942	14 September 1943	2,322	200
Monigo	Treviso	Italy	1 July 1942	May 1945	10,000	187–225
Molat	Molat	Croatia	28 June 1942	8 September 1943	20,000	c. 1,000
Pisticci	Southeast of Pisticci in Camporotondo	Italy	1939	September 13, 1943	Capacity of 1,000	Not stated
Rab, separate camps for Slovenes/Croats and Jews	Rab (Arbe) island	Croatia	July 1942	11 September 1943	10,000; 15,000	2,000; >3,500; 4,000
Renicci di Anghiari	Arezzo	Italy	October 1942		10,000	159
Risiera di San Sabba	Trieste	Italy	October 1943	April 1945	> 11,500	4,000–5,000
Sidi Azaz	Sidi Azaz	Libya	July 1942	Late January 1943	1,000	3
Visco	Palmanova	Italy	winter 1942			
Zlarin	Zlarin	Croatia	March 1943	June 1943	2,500	26
Campo di Fossoli	Carpi	Italy	May 1942	March 1944		
