= El Agheila concentration camp =

Italian concentration camp in Libya

The El Agheila concentration camp was an Italian concentration camp established in El Agheila in the Italian colony of Libya during the Pacification of Libya that occurred from 1928 to 1932. The camp is recorded as having a population of 10,900 people.

== See also ==
- Italian concentration camps
- Italian concentration camps in Libya
- Italian Libya
- Libyan genocide
- Second Italo-Senussi War
