= Agedabia concentration camp =

Coordinates: 30.752°N 20.230°E

The Agedabia concentration camp was an Italian concentration camp established in Ajdabiya (also known as Agedabia) in the Italian colony of Libya during the Second Italo-Senussi War that occurred from 1928 to 1932. The camp is recorded as having a population of 10,000 people.

== See also ==
- List of Italian concentration camps
- Italian concentration camps in Libya
- Italian Libya
- Libyan genocide
- Second Italo-Senussi War
