= Marsa Brega concentration camp =

Italian concentration camp in Libya

The Marsa Brega concentration camp was an Italian concentration camp established in the village of Brega (also known as Marsa Brega) in the Italian colony of Libya during the Pacification of Libya that occurred from 1928 to 1932. The camp is recorded as having a population of 21,117 people.

== See also ==
- Italian concentration camps
- Italian concentration camps in Libya
- Italian Libya
- Libyan genocide
- Second Italo-Senussi War
