= Internment =

Imprisonment or confinement of groups of people without trial

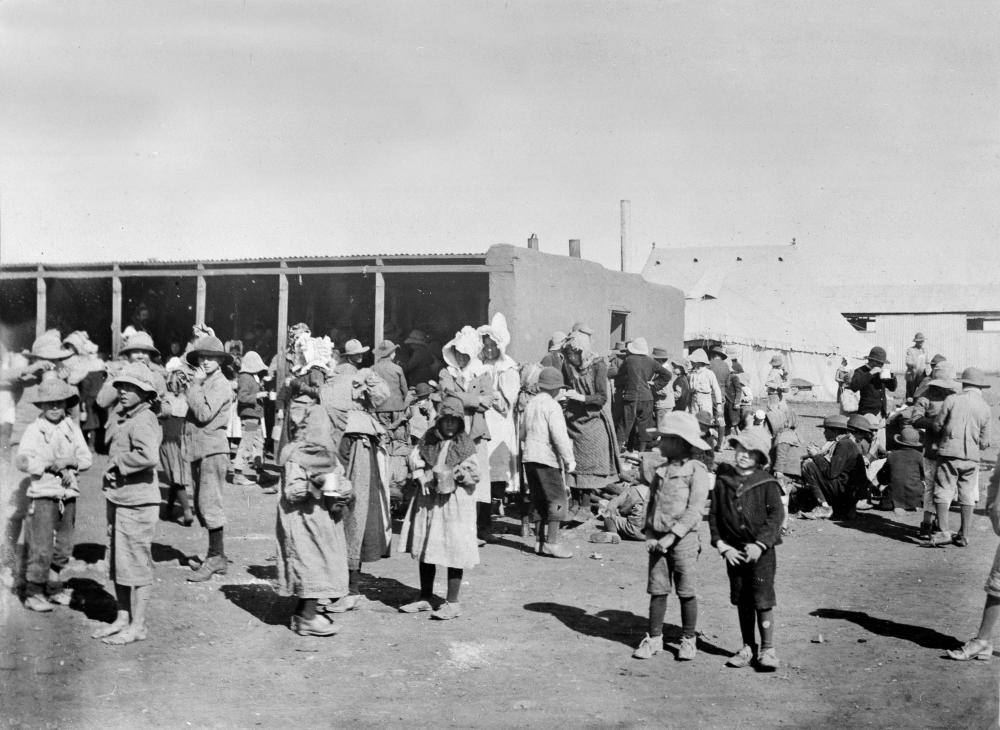
Boer women and children in a British concentration camp in South Africa (1899–1902)

Internment is the imprisonment of people, commonly in large groups, without charges or intent to file charges. The term is especially used for the confinement "of enemy citizens in wartime or of terrorism suspects". Thus, while it can simply mean imprisonment, it tends to refer to preventive confinement rather than confinement after having been convicted of some crime. Use of these terms is subject to debate and political sensitivities. The word internment is also occasionally used to describe a neutral country's practice of detaining belligerent armed forces and equipment on its territory during times of war, under the Hague Convention of 1907.

Interned persons may be held in prisons or in facilities known as internment camps or concentration camps. The term concentration camp originates from the Spanish–Cuban Ten Years' War when Spanish forces detained Cuban civilians in camps in order to more easily combat guerrilla forces. Over the following decades the British during the Second Boer War and the Americans during the Philippine–American War also used concentration camps.

The terms concentration camp and internment camp are used to refer to a variety of systems that greatly differ in their severity, mortality rate, and architecture; their defining characteristic is that inmates are held outside the rule of law. Extermination camps or death camps, whose primary purpose is killing, are also imprecisely referred to as concentration camps.

The Universal Declaration of Human Rights restricts the use of internment, with Article 9 stating, "No one shall be subjected to arbitrary arrest, detention or exile."

== Defining internment and concentration camp ==
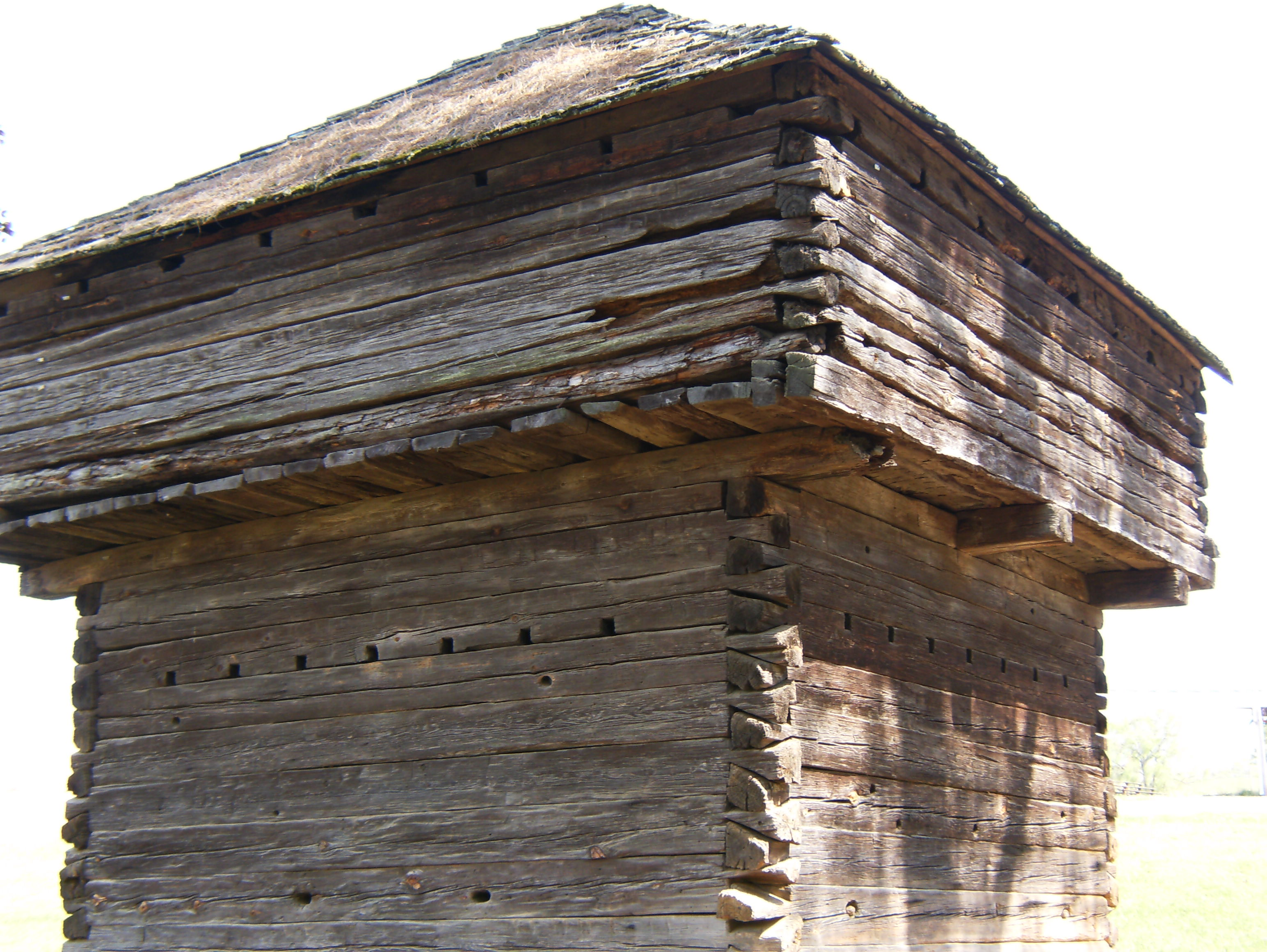
Fort Marr is the last surviving remnant of the American forts used to intern the Cherokee in preparation for their removal to Indian Territory, months prior the "Trail of Tears".

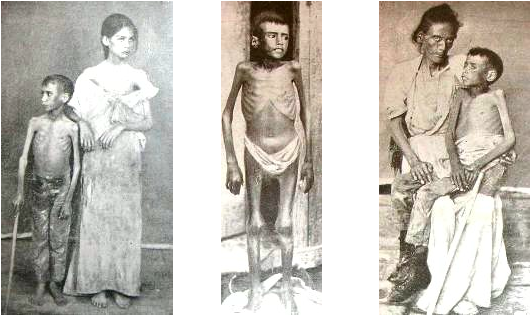
Cuban victims of Spanish reconcentration policies, 1896.

The American Heritage Dictionary defines the term concentration camp as: "A camp where persons are confined, usually without hearings and typically under harsh conditions, often as a result of their membership in a group which the government has identified as dangerous or undesirable."

Although the first example of civilian internment may date as far back as the 1830s, the English term concentration camp was first used in order to refer to the reconcentration camps (Spanish:reconcentrados) which were set up by the Spanish military in Cuba during the Ten Years' War (1868–1878). The label was applied yet again to camps set up by the United States during the Philippine–American War (1899–1902). And expanded usage of the concentration camp label continued, when the British set up camps during the Second Boer War (1899–1902) in South Africa for interning Boers during the same time period.

During the 20th century, the arbitrary internment of civilians by the state reached its most extreme forms in the Soviet Gulag system of concentration camps (1918–1991) and the Nazi concentration camps (1933–1945). The Soviet system was the first applied by a government on its own citizens. The Gulag consisted in over 30,000 camps for most of its existence (1918–1991) and detained some 18 million from 1929 until 1953, which is only a third of its 73-year lifespan. The Nazi concentration camp system was extensive, with as many as 15,000 camps and at least 715,000 simultaneous internees. The total number of casualties in these camps is difficult to determine, but the deliberate policy of extermination through labor in many of the camps was designed to ensure that the inmates would die of starvation, untreated disease and summary executions within set periods of time. Moreover, Nazi Germany established six extermination camps, specifically designed to kill millions of people, primarily by gassing.

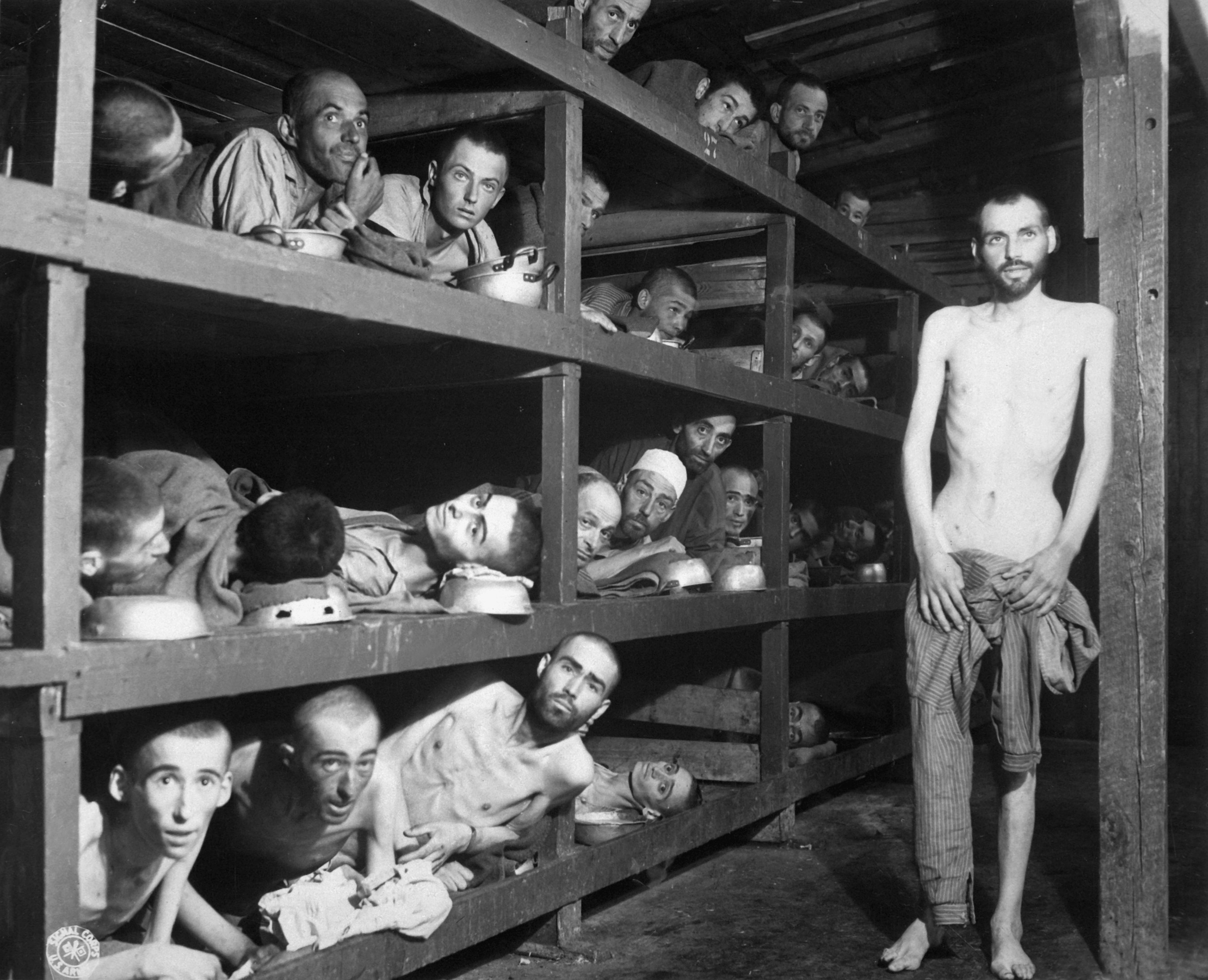
Jewish slave laborers at the Buchenwald concentration camp near Weimar photographed after their liberation by the Allies on 16 April 1945

As a result, the term "concentration camp" is sometimes conflated with the concept of an "extermination camp" and historians debate whether the term "concentration camp" or the term "internment camp" should be used to describe other examples of civilian internment.

The "concentration camp" label continues to see expanded use for cases post-World War II, for instance in relation to British camps in Kenya during the Mau Mau rebellion (1952–1960), and camps set up in Chile during the military dictatorship of Augusto Pinochet (1973–1990). According to the United States Department of Defense as many as 3 million Uyghurs and members of other Muslim minority groups have been held in China's re-education camps which are located in the Xinjiang region and which American news reports often label as concentration camps. The camps were established in the late 2010s under Chinese Communist Party general secretary Xi Jinping's administration.

== Impact ==
Scholars have debated the efficacy of internment as a counterinsurgency tactic. A 2023 study found that internment during the Irish war of independence led to greater grievances among Irish rebels and led them to fight longer in the war.

== Examples ==
=== Active ===
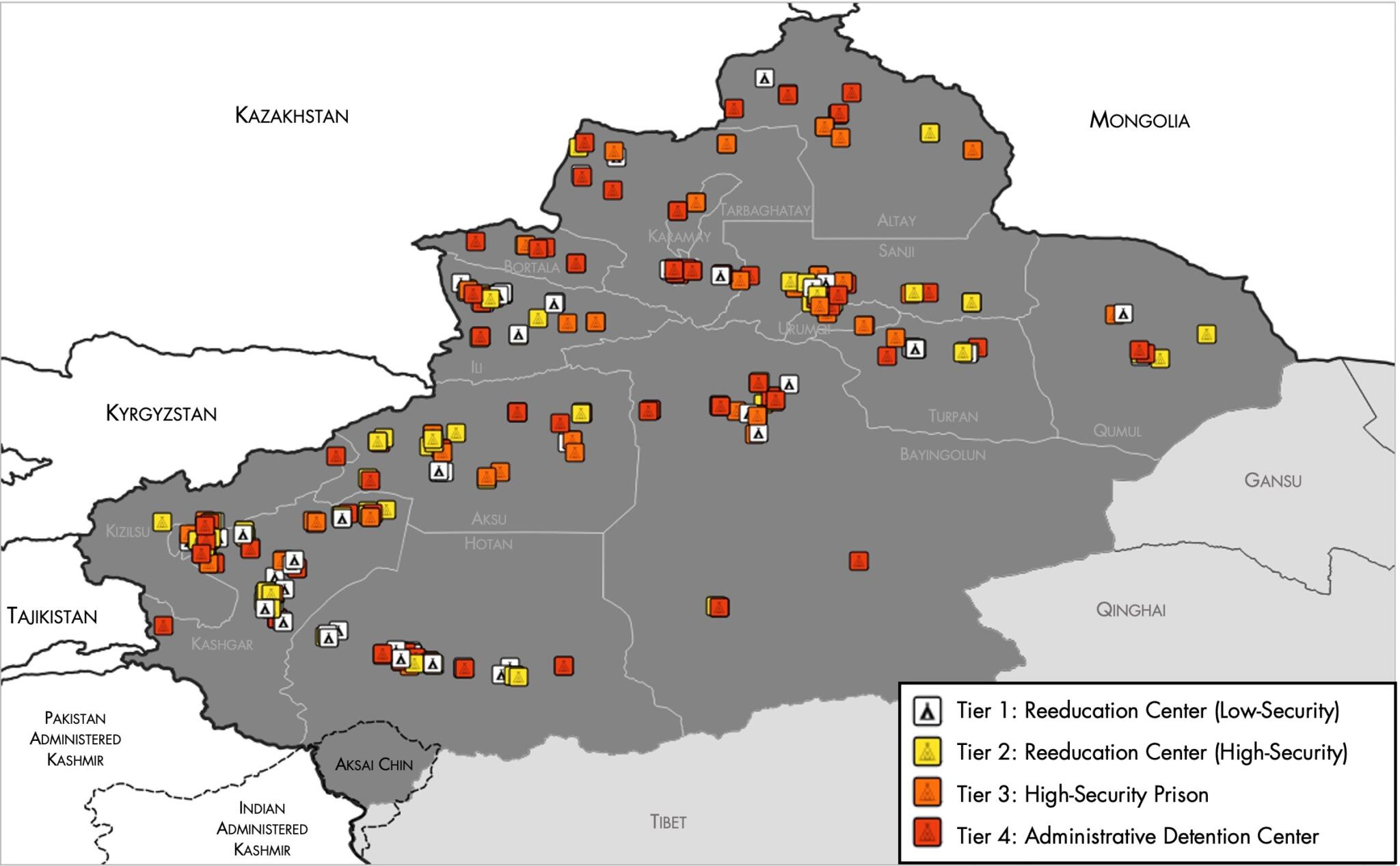
Map of the Xinjiang re-education camps in China based on data collected by the US National Geospatial-Intelligence Agency and the Australian Strategic Policy Institute

- North Korean prison camps (1948–present)
- Guantanamo Bay detention camp (2002–present)
- Refugee detention centres in Libya (2011–present)
- Anti-gay detention camps in Chechnya (2017–present)
- Migrant internment camps as part of immigration detention in the United States (2018–present) in facilities such as Alligator Alcatraz
- Internment camps in Ethiopia during the Tigray War and the War in Amhara (2020–present).
- Russian filtration camps in Ukraine during the Russian invasion of Ukraine (2022–present)
- Sde Teiman detention camp in Israel during the Gaza war (2024–present)
- Italian migrant detention camps in Albania (2024–present)

=== Closed ===
- Abercorn Barracks, Northern Ireland (sometimes referred to as Ballykinlar Barracks) (1919–1921, 1971)
- Reconcentration policy during Cuba's War of Independence from Spain (1896–1898)
- Second Boer War in South Africa (1900–1902)
- Curragh Camp in Ireland (1939–1946, 1957–1959). Curragh Camp was by far the largest, at least 30 other prisons and camps were used throughout the country.
- Cyprus internment camps (1946–1949)
- Reconcentrados "Zones of Protection" 1901, Philippine-American War
- Herero and Namaqua genocide (1904–1907)
- Concentration of Armenians during the Armenian Genocide (1915–1916)
- Internment camps in France and its colonies (1910s-1960s)
- Finnish Civil War (1918)
- Frongoch internment camp British camp used for WWI and Irish 1916 Easter Rising prisoners
- Gormanston Camp in the Irish Free State (1922–1923)
- Malayan New villages as part of the Briggs Plan during the Malayan Emergency (1950–1960)
- Italian concentration camps in Africa and Europe (1930–1944)
- HM Prison Maze in Northern Ireland (1971–1975), previously known as Long Kesh Detention Centre, and known colloquially as the Maze or H-Blocks)
- German concentration camps before and during World War II (1933–1945)
- Japanese internment of prisoners of war and civilians during World War II (ended 1945)
- German-American internment camps in World War II (1941–1948)
- Italian-American internment camps in World War II (1941–1943)
- Japanese-American internment camps in World War II (1942–1946)
- Japanese Canadian internment (1942–1949)
- Deoli internment camp in India (1962–1967)
- Omarska camp in Bosnia, 1992
- Dretelj camp (1992–1995)
- Camp Bucca in Iraq (2003–2009)
- Abu Ghraib prison in Iraq (1980–2014)
- Xinjiang re-education camps in China (2017–2019)
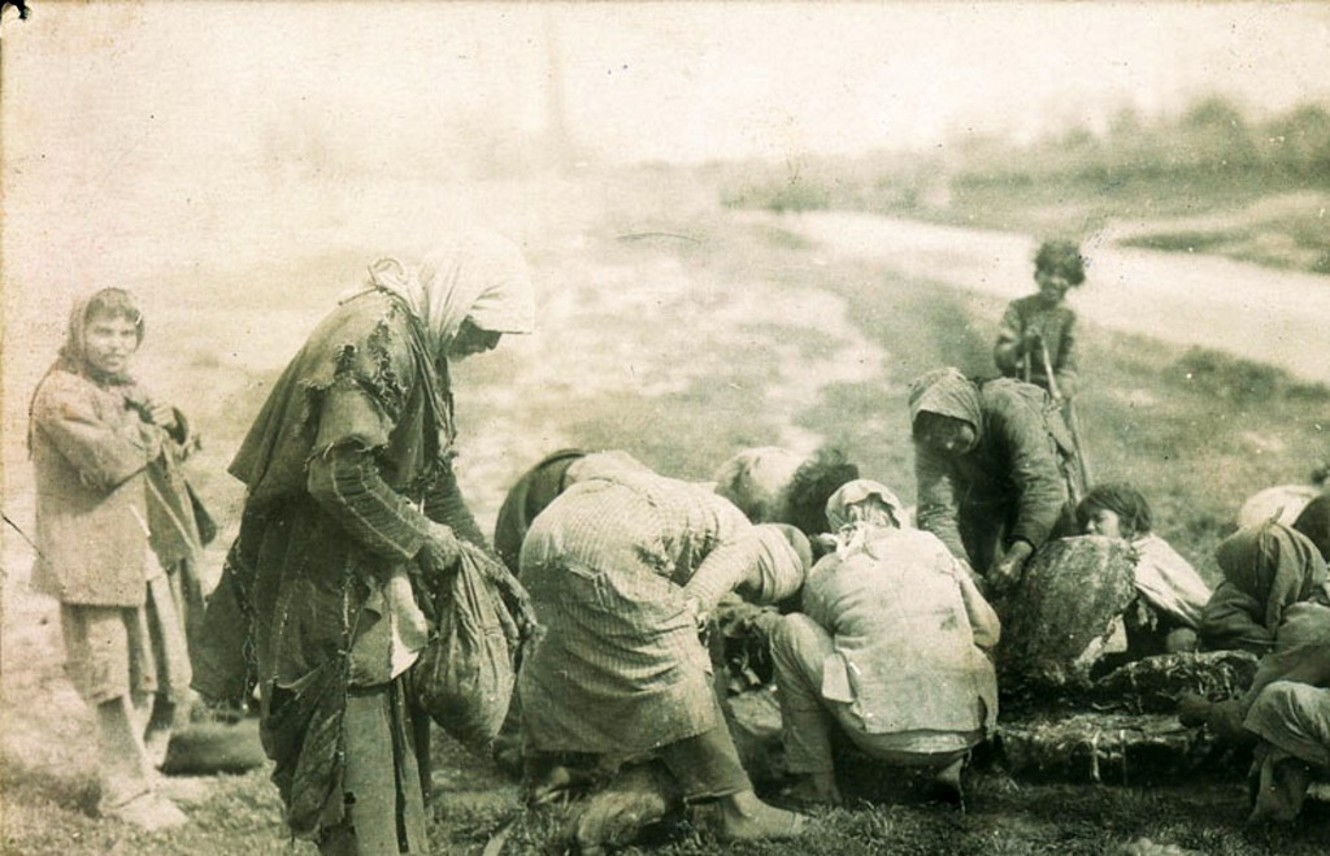
Armenian refugees collected near the body of a dead horse at Deir ez-Zor, during the Armenian genocide

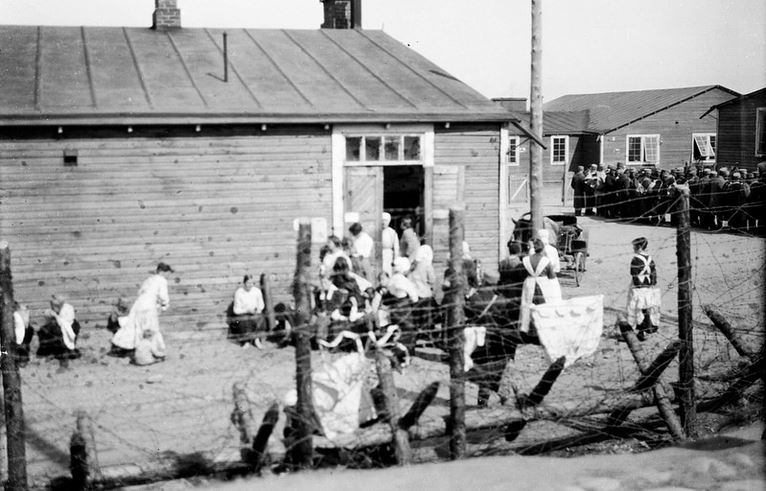
Women at the Kalevankangas concentration camp of Tampere in 1918, several months after the Finnish Civil War

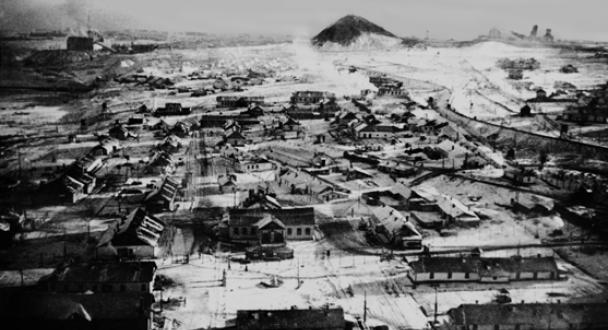
Aerial view of the Vorkutlag, a major Russian gulag

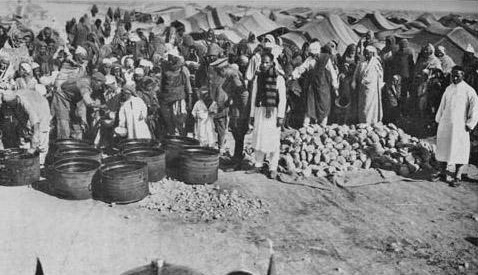
Inmates at El Agheila, one of the Italian concentration camps during the Italian colonization of Libya

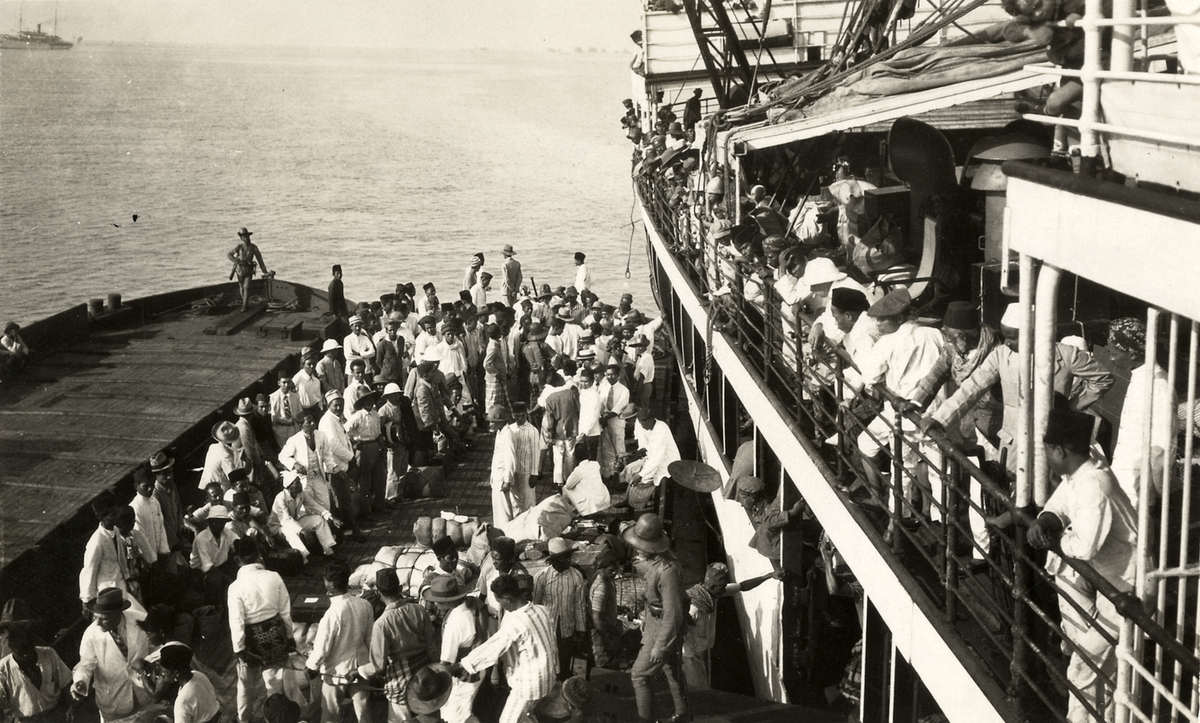
Indonesian prisoners being exiled to the Dutch camp of Boven-Digoel, 1927

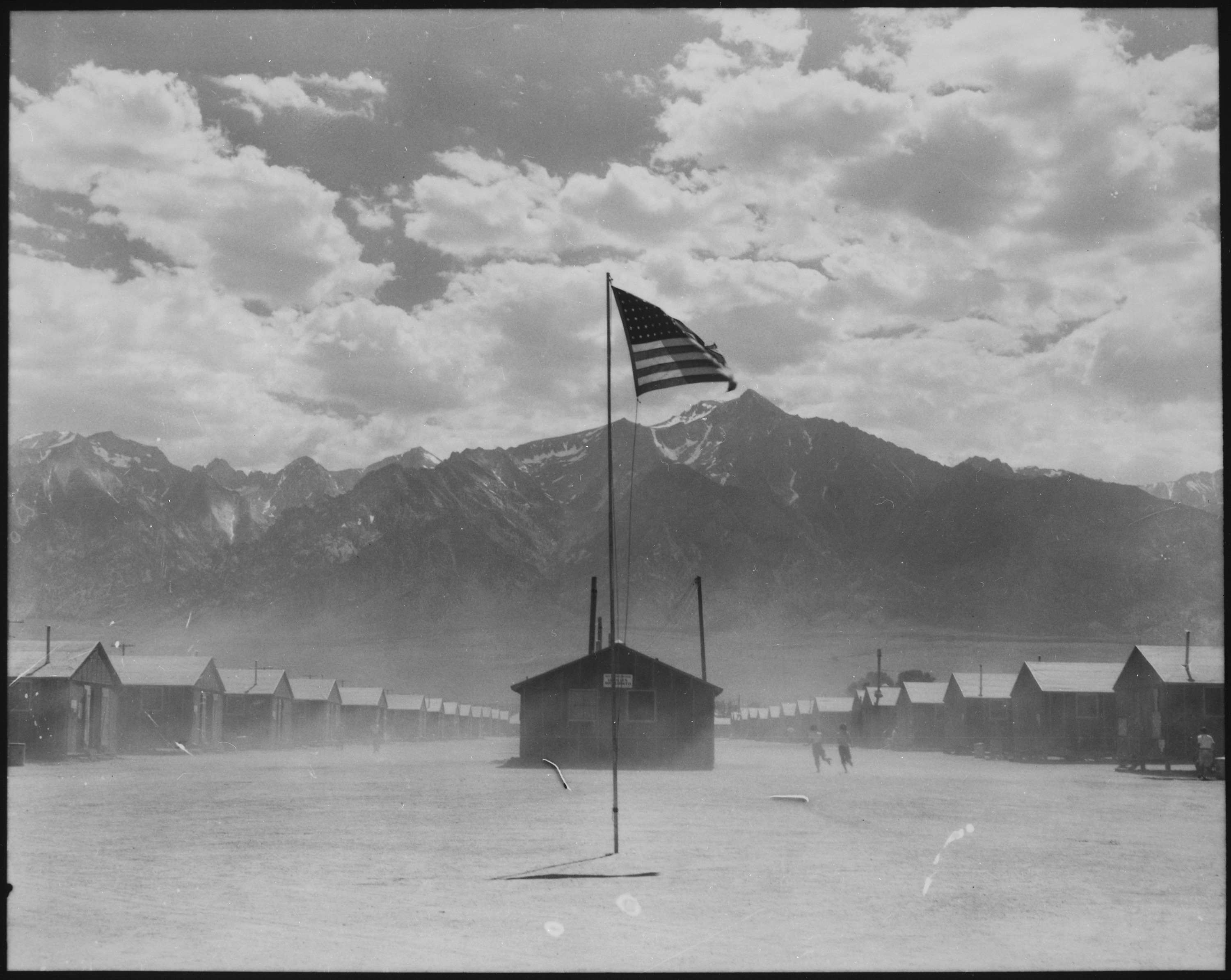
Manzanar internment camp for Japanese-Americans in 1942

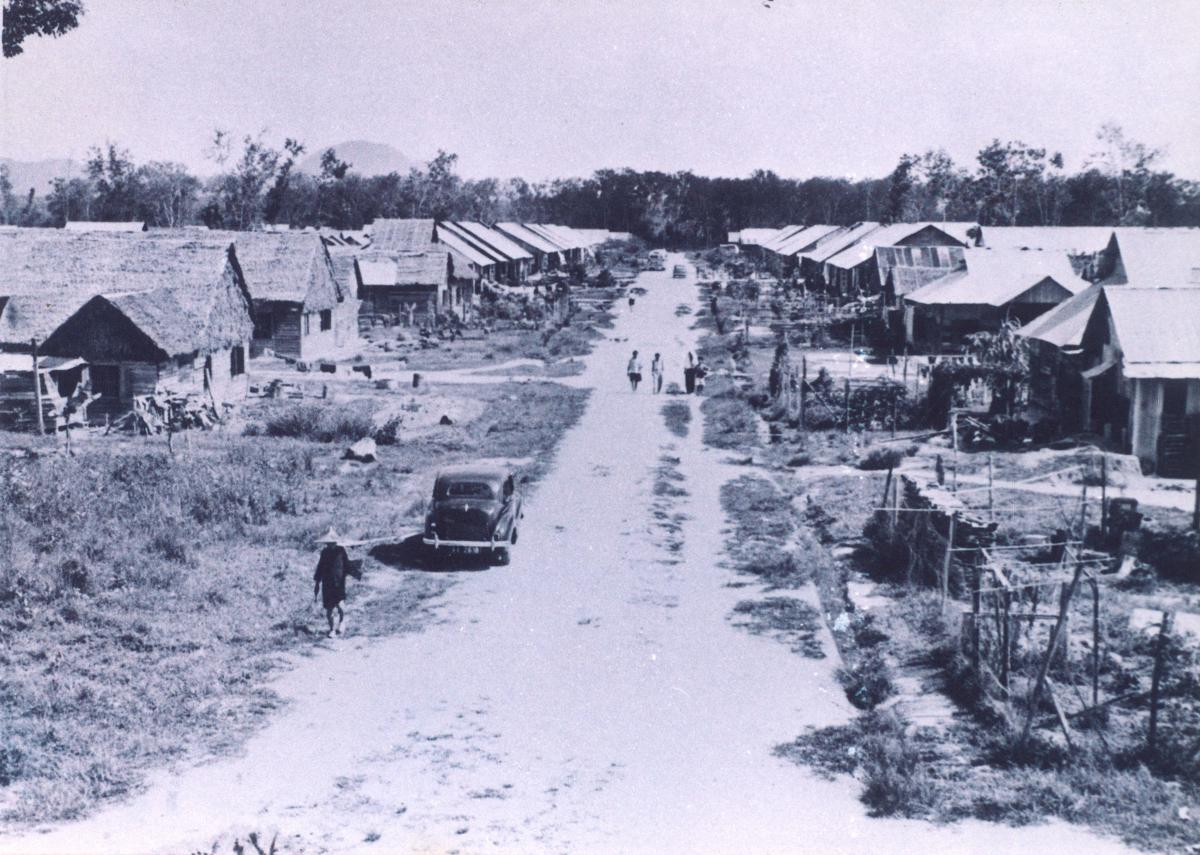
A British model new village, designed as part of the Briggs Plan to separate the largely Chinese Malaysian rural populace from communist guerrillas during the Malayan Emergency (1948–1960)

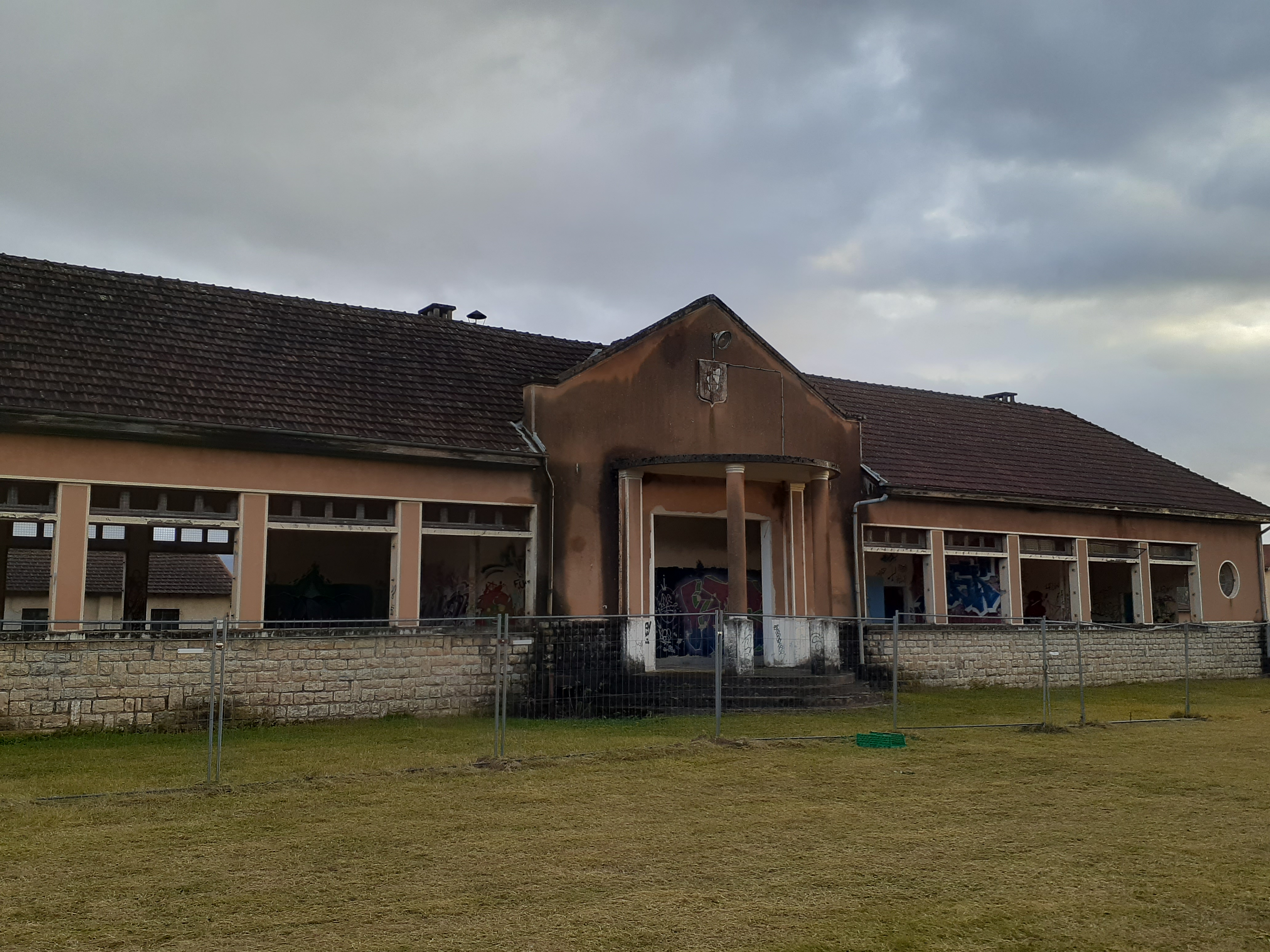
Camp de Thol, one of the French concentration camps for Algerians used during the Algerian War

== Combatants ==
Internment also refers to the detainment of combatants and equipment of a belligerent by a neutral state. During a conflict, combatants of a belligerent state that enter the territory of a neutral state should be either expelled or interned. When interned, the neutral state is responsible for ensuring the well-being of the combatants as well as ensuring they or their equipment cannot participate in the conflict until hostilities cease.

The neutral state can hold interned personal in camps or other secure places and, at the discretion of the neutral State may be given parole but cannot be allowed to leave neutral territory. The internees must be fed and clothed, and allowed relief supplies. The belligerent State is responsible at the end of hostilities for covering the costs incurred by the neutral state. The conditions the internees are held in should be based on an agreement between the neutral State and the belligerent State, but if there is no agreement, they must be at the minimum treatment equivalent to that of POWs under the Third Geneva Convention.

If the neutral state is unable or unwilling to carry out internment or expulsion of belligerent forces within its territory the adverse party is entitled to undertake hot pursuit and attack the belligerent forces within neutral territory and seek compensation from the neutral State for a breach of neutrality.

== See also ==
- Civilian internee
- Extermination through labor
- Extrajudicial detention
- Gulag
- New village
- Bantustan
- House arrest
- Labor camp
- Kwalliso (North Korean political penal labour colonies)
- Laogai (Chinese, "reform through labor")
- Military Units to Aid Production
- "Polish death camp" controversy
- Prison overcrowding
- Prisoner-of-war camp
- Prisons in North Korea
- Quasi-criminal
- Reductions – Spanish colonial settlements for relocation and Christianization of Indigenous peoples
- Re-education camp (Vietnam)
- Re-education through labor
- Remand (detention)
