= Sid Ahmed el Maghrun concentration camp =

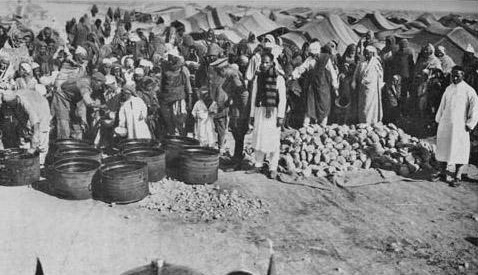
Campo di Concentramento Sidi Ahmed el-Magrun.

The Sid Ahmed el Maghrun concentration camp was an Italian concentration camp established in El Magrun (also known as Sid Ahmed el Maghrun) in the Italian colony of Libya during the Pacification of Libya that occurred from 1928 to 1932. The camp is recorded as having a population of 13,050 people.

== See also ==
- Italian concentration camps
- Italian concentration camps in Libya
- Italian Libya
- Libyan genocide
- Second Italo-Senussi War
