= Molat concentration camp =

Italian concentration camp

Molat
- Italian concentration camp
- Coordinates: 44.2165°N 14.8791°E
- Location: Molat, Governorate of Dalmatia
- Operated by: Italian Ministry of the Interior
- Commandant: Leonardo Fantoli
- Operational: 30 June 1942 – 8 September 1943
- Inmates: Yugoslav civilians (mostly Croats, and Slovenes)
- Number of inmates: 20,000
- Killed: 1,000

The Molat concentration camp (Italian: campo di concentramento di Melada; Croatian: Koncentracijski logor Molat; Serbian: Концентрациони логор Молат; Slovene: Koncentracijsko taborišče Molat) was an Italian concentration camp, established during World War II, by Fascist Italy on the island of Molat and was subordinate to the Italian Ministry of the Interior.

The camp existed from June 30, 1942 to September 8, 1943 and, like the Gonars and Rab concentration camps, was used mainly for the internment of Slovenes, and Croats in order to "Italianize" the region of annexed Dalmatia. According to the camp's commemorative plaque, the camp, consisting of five barracks, was passed through by about 20,000 inmates, of whom about 1,000 died, due to the inhumane conditions in the camp or were shot as hostages in retaliation for Partisan attacks.

Number of inmates
	June 1942	July 1942	August 1942	September 1942	November 1942	December 1942	January 1943	February 1943
Number of inmates	223	1.320	2.337	2.300	2.200	2.400	1.627	1.500
