= Internment camps in Ethiopia =

Internment camps in Ethiopia during the prime ministership of Abiy Ahmed during the 2020s include camps holding Tigrayans during the Tigray war, Eritreans, and Amharas during the war in Amhara.

== Tigrayans ==
Internment camps to hold Tigrayans were run during the Tigray war, starting in November 2020, when 700 ethnic Tigrayans were detained in Addis Ababa. The number dropped to around 300 in December 2020. Authorities cited the reason for detention as being suspicion of links to the Tigray People's Liberation Front (TPLF). An Abbadi warehouse detention site in Mai Kadra held 3000 to 8000 detainees, including 400 children and people aged in their 70s and 80s, during November 2020, with no provision of food or water by the camp guards; Doctors Without Borders had access to the camp and provided food and water.

In April 2021, 500 ethnic Tigrayans were held under arbitrary arrest based on their ethnic identity in an Addis Ababa detention centre. Conditions were described as "miserable" by a health worker, with around 30 detainees per room. None of the detainees had been brought before a judge as of May 2021. A wave of arrests of ethnic Tigrayans and of journalists took place in July 2021. The Ethiopian Human Rights Commission (EHRC) stated that it was monitoring the detentions.

In September, Amhara Region forces detained "thousands" of ethnic Tigrayan men, women and children, residents of Humera, in detention centres that witnesses described to The Daily Telegraph as concentration camps, in which eyes were removed from one victim, victims' limbs were cut off and bodies were thrown into mass graves. According to a participant of a public meeting in Humera, the Amhara forces stated, "We should exterminate all Tigrayan residents in the city. We must cleanse them all." An administrative list indicating residents's identification as Tigrayan from their identity cards was used to find Tigrayans in house-to-house operations. Salon.com, based on witness reports by former detainees and doctors, satellite imagery and video recordings, stated that children among the detainees were starved and abused.

In November 2021, a wave of ethnicity-based arrests of Tigrayans including "dozens of priests, monks, deacons and others" took place. The New York Times described these as having "swept up anyone of Tigrayan descent, many of whom had no ties to the rebels or even affinity for them," including "mothers with children and the elderly". Laetitia Bader of HRW described the state of emergency, which formally permitted the mass detentions, as "'legitimizing and legalizing unlawful practices' and creating a 'real climate of fear'." On 20 November, Genocide Watch classified the Ethiopian situation as including stage 8 of genocide, persecution.

=== Mirab Abaya massacre ===
Based on its investigation including "26 interviews with prisoners, medical personnel, officials, local residents and relatives, and on a review of satellite imagery, social media posts and medical records", The Washington Post found that on one day in November 2021, 83 Tigrayan prisoners were executed in the Mirab Abaya detention camp, which held from 2000 to 2500 Tigrayan soldiers and former soldiers, by about 18 of the camp guards. The victims' bodies were piled in a mass gave near the camp entrance. The massacre stopped when Girma Ayele, a colonel, arrived. Girma stated that the guards suspected of the killings were arrested.

Officials in Mirab Abaya made announcements on loudspeakers requesting locals to kill any escapees. Among a group of prisoners who escaped from the camp during the massacre, most were lynched by a group of local residents.

The EHRC stated that it was investigating the massacre.

=== Abuses and killings ===
Torture and beatings were systematic at the camps. In the Abbadi camp in November 2020, guards stated in response to a request for the purchase of insulin for a detainee with diabetes, "We are not here to treat you; we are here to kill you. We are gathering the Tigrayan refugees here to kill them."

=== Numbers ===
In November 2021, Salsay Weyane Tigray estimated 20,000 to 30,000 detentions of Tigrayans outside of war zones. African Citizens estimated the number of Tigrayans held "just for the crime of who they are or where they come from" to be 40,000 on 26 November 2021. On the same day, Clark, Lapsley & Alton estimated 30,000 Tigrayan civilians detained in Addis Ababa, 15,000 Tigrayan military detained since late 2020, and unknown numbers of Tigrayans held in western Tigray and elsewhere in Ethiopia.

== Eritreans ==
In July 2022, Eritrean refugees were held in detention camps near Debarq in Amhara Region and near Alemwach.

== Amharas ==
During the war in Amhara, Amharas were held in detention centres that were overcrowded and had insufficient access to medical care, leading to two hundred deaths in September 2023 due to a cholera outbreak.

== Terminology ==
The 2020s camps holding Tigrayans were described as concentration camps by Jonathan Hutson, writing in Salon.com, who argued that the term was justified on the basis of thousands of adults and hundreds of children being "held in harsh conditions, systematically starved and beaten because of their ethnicity and with no judicial process or valid legal pretext" by Ethiopian security forces.

In November 2021, on online social media, journalists, politicians and pro-government activists called for Tigrayans to be held in what they referred to as concentration camps. Online footage of the detention centres for Amharas in September 2023 described them as concentration camps.

The Lemkin Institute for Genocide Prevention stated that the 2023 camps holding Amharas were concentration camps.

== Locations ==
Locations of the internment centres include the Awash Arba and Awash Sebat detention centres in Afar Region; a detention centre near Gelan Condominiums in Addis Ababa; an Abbadi warehouse compound in Mai Kadra; a camp at Mirab Abaya; and a camp holding Amharas in September 2023 in Tulu Dimtu according to the Amhara Association of America.
