= Italian concentration camps in Libya =

- Part of the Second Italo-Senussi War, Libyan genocide, and The Holocaust in Libya
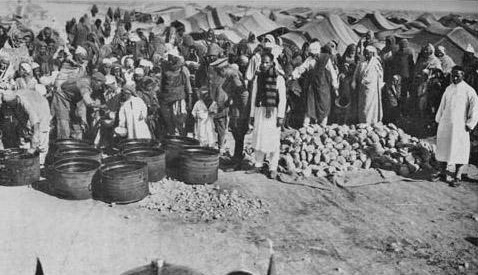
- Inmates at the Sid Ahmed el Maghrun concentration camp
- Location: Libya
- Date: 1929 – 1934
- Target: Libyans
- Attack type: internment
- Deaths: 50,000 to 70,000
- Victims: 100,000 to 110,000 deported to concentration camps
- Perpetrator: Fascist Italy
- Motive: Colonialism, suppression of Senussi resistance

During the Italian colonization of Libya (1911-1943) the Kingdom of Italy (1861-1946) established concentration camps in the areas of modern Libya under its control in order to better subjugate the local population and to more effectively suppress resistance to Italian colonial rule.

== Background: the beginning of Italian colonization in Libya ==
The Italian colonization of Libya began in 1911, when Libya was part of the Ottoman Empire, and ended in 1943. Following the 1911-1912 Italo-Turkish War in Libya, the Kingdom of Italy seized the territory and established the colonies of Italian Tripolitania and Italian Cyrenaica. In 1934, these two colonies were unified into Italian Libya. Colonial oppression intensified following unification of the colonies and the onset of Italy's participation in World War II. In 1940, under Fascist rule, Italy joined Nazi Germany and the Empire of Japan as an Axis power. In 1943, Italian rule in Libya effectively ended with the government's military defeat by Allied forces and the subsequent onset of Allied occupation. The modern successor state to the Kingdom of Italy, however, only formally relinquished all claims to Libya with the 1947 Paris Peace Treaty.

The conquest of Libya took place in two phases; the first began on the 4th of October 1911 under Giovanni Giolitti’s command. The expansionism would have ensured raw materials and a new land to migrate for Italians. Additionally, Italy would have benefited economically from the conquest because it could gain control of the Sahara trade. However, the most determinant argument to conquer Libya was the southern question (Italian: questione meridionale) that took place in Italy during the 1890s.

The landless and sharecropping peasants in the south were putting pressure on the Italian ruling elites claiming land and voting rights. Following a series of riots and rebellions in the south, the ruling classes attempted to find a solution to this problem by relocating Italian peasants in colonies.

Giolitti assumed that since Libyans had resented Ottoman rule from 1551 until 1911, Italians would be welcomed by the local population, however, this was not the case. Libyans for a long time placed a strong resistance against the occupation and fought anti-colonial resistance with an army of volunteers from 1911 to 1915, then they managed to defeat the Italian army that in 1916 made a truce.

=== Mussolini Regime and the integration of Fascism ===
The second phase started with the arrival of Benito Mussolini, an Italian politician, leader and founder of the National Fascist Party. He rose to power as Prime Minister of Italy from March 1922 until his deposition in 1943. With his arrival, he took control over the colonization expenditure and the scale of the occupation escalated.

He referred to Libya as the "Fourth Shore" because it represented the fourth side of the national quadrilateral completed by the three coasts of the Adriatic where there are Trieste, Bari and Durazzo. Deadly instruments of war were used because it was clear that in order to empty the land, the native population had to be defeated.

The motive behind this colonization was that fascists dreamed of settling 500,000 to 1 million Italians in the “fourth shore”.

The state financed and officially organized a mass migration of peasant-farming families on the African coast of the Mediterranean. Amongst the 6,000 families who were admitted “to plead” only 1,800 of them were selected. The requirements were clear, working units - which did not include friends or relations but only close family members - had to be composed of at least 10 members, all healthy and loyal. Additionally, the family had to be experienced in the field of agriculture.

The settlers desired to migrate as Italy was becoming over-crowded and there was a strong urge to “own land”. These farms were ready in seven months; the colonists walked into efficiently constructed white farmhouses with irrigating aqueducts, asphalt roads and private lands that averaged thirty-seven acres.

Families were also allowed to visit their village centres, which included churches, cinemas, sports and co-operatives.

Italy was enthusiastic about this project because the country wished to achieve self-sufficiency in the production of corn and oil and furthermore because they had estimated that by 1943 the national population living in Libya would reach 100,000 of which an approximate 40,000 men representing a strong military reserve in a strategic corner of the Mediterranean.

=== Popular resistance ===
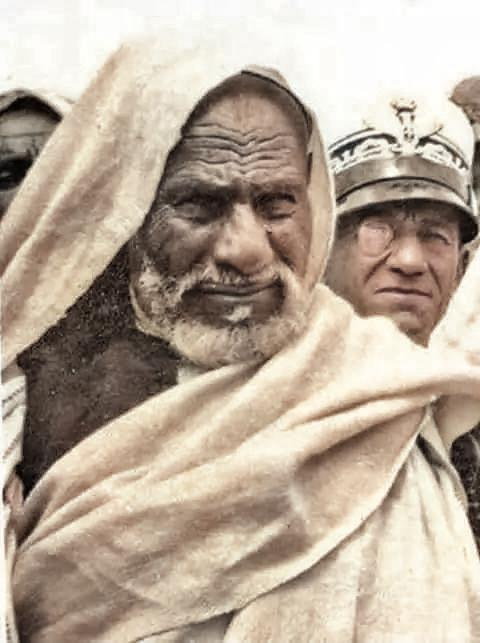
Omar al-Mukthar

However, the Italians had underestimated the resistance of the Ottoman army and in particular of the Libyan population. In fact, even if the government of the country was apparently weak, the society was used to self administrate itself based on religious or sectarian organizations. Once arrived in Libya, the fascists faced a poor yet organized and stubborn resistance that they had to fight for 20 years.

The face of the armed Arab opposition mainly happened in Cyrenaica under the leadership of Omar Mukhtar, where Italian forces under the Generals Pietro Badoglio and Rodolfo Graziani waged punitive pacification campaigns which turned into brutal and bloody acts of repression.

However, with the arrival of Mussolini, the generals were given the command to stop compromising with the resistance and to defeat it with violence at whatever cost in order to free the land for settlement.

The Frontier Wire, a barbed wire fence was built from the Mediterranean to the oasis of Al-Jaghbub to sever lines critical to the resistance. Soon afterwards, the colonial administration began the wholesale deportation of the people from the mountains of Jebel Akhdar, to deny the rebels the support of the local population.

=== Mass deportation ===
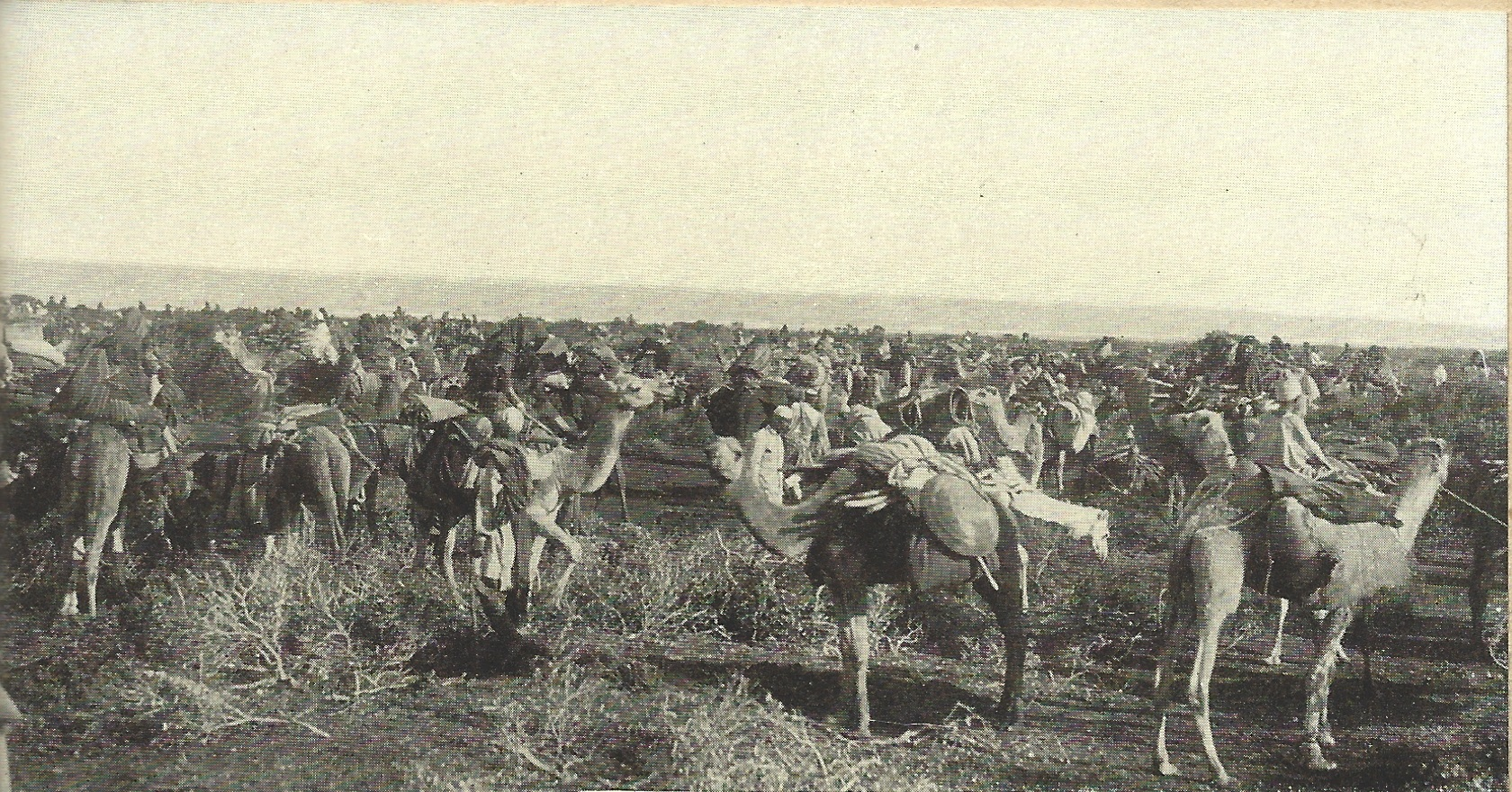
Members of the nomadic tribes of Cyrenaica with their herds during their forceful transfer to the Italian concentration camps.

Fascist Italy maintained several concentration camps in Cyrenaica (Eastern Libya) during the later phase of its occupation of that country. In order to win against the resistance in Libya, the Italian troops were ordered to isolate the native troops.

Furthermore, Italy felt that they had the right to colonize the whole Mediterranean because they are the successors of the Roman empire. Mussolini desired to transplant a new Roman and Fascist civilization within the African land.

Firstly a fence along 300 kilometres of the Egyptian border was built in order to cut the supply of primary resources. Shortly after between 100,000 and 110,000 children, women, and elderly people and 600,000 animals were moved to the Sirte desert in concentration camps in Suluq, El Magrun, Abyar and El Agheila where 16 concentration camps had been built and tens of thousands died in squalid conditions.

Fascist Italy maintained several concentration camps in Cyrenaica (Eastern Libya) during the later phase of its occupation of that country. After the initial invasion in 1911, the Italian control over much of the country remained ineffective.

This destructive period went on from 1929 until 1934. The local population died of starvation, untreated diseases and overall deprivation of support and aid. In addition to starvation and disease, people in the camps were traumatized by the continuous public executions of prisoners and by “marad”. This word describes the physical and psychological trauma caused by the separation of the herds from the seminomad population. In their culture, animal/human unity was essential and seeing that their herds were being left to die of hunger was unbearable. Almost 168,000 animals were captured and killed.

The Libyan population used the word “shar” to describe the horror of the genocide in the death camps. This word comes from the religious book of the Qur’an and it means evil, the opposite of good.

The survivors released in 1934 were less than 40,000. They were free but stayed under surveillance for 2 years as they could not go back to their houses because they were occupied by Italians.

=== Estimates of deaths in concentration camps ===
Italian concentration camps in Libya 1930–1933

By the end it was estimated that a total number of 60,000 to 70,000 people died. The total number of Libyans who died either through combat or mainly due to starvation and disease is unclear, however, in 1910 the Libyan population was made up of around 1.5 million people while in 1943 it had significantly decreased to 800,000. Ilan Pappé estimates that between 1928 and 1932 the Italian military "killed half the Bedouin population (directly or through disease and starvation in camps)." Italian historian Emilio Gentile estimates 50,000 deaths resulting from the suppression of resistance.

=== Genocide recognition ===
Since the first phase of colonization, Italian media reported a distorted narrative of the conflict. The Italians were depicted as liberators from Ottoman rule, and the repression campaigns, such as the ones following the battle of Sciara Sciat, were hidden from the population. On the other side, the Arabs were described as 'beasts' that needed to be civilized by the Europeans.

For this reason, it was difficult to convince the Italian population of the genocidal nature of the National Fascist colonization campaign in Libya. This part of colonial history is almost an erased memory. Internationally, the Italian people are recognised as people of culture, arts, and beauty, and hence they are thought to be incapable of committing such crimes.

Italian Fascism is still today considered moderate in comparison to the Nazi party in Germany, when the truth is that the latter took inspiration from Italian concentration camps and methods of repression.

However, the Libyan colonization can be considered genocide because the population was killed intentionally and the cultural, biological and economic basis of the community was completely destroyed and replaced.

=== 2008 Cooperation Treaty ===
On 30 August 2008, Gaddafi and Italian Prime Minister Silvio Berlusconi signed a historic Friendship, Partnership and Cooperation treaty in Benghazi Under its terms, Italy will pay $5 billion to Libya as compensation for its former military occupation. In exchange, Libya will take measures to combat illegal immigration coming from its shores and boost investments in Italian companies. The treaty was ratified by Italy on 6 February 2009, and by Libya on 2 March, during a visit to Tripoli by Berlusconi.

The intent was therefore, to put an end to the disputes related to colonialism, but contemporarily, create an advantageous economic condition for Italy.

== Camps for Libyan natives in World War II ==
Fascist Italy, aligned with Nazi Germany during World War II, operated a number of concentration camps and labor camps for Libyan natives. Among them are Giado, Buq Buq, and Sidi Azaz.
