= Qaminis =

Qaminis قمينس Ghemines
- Town
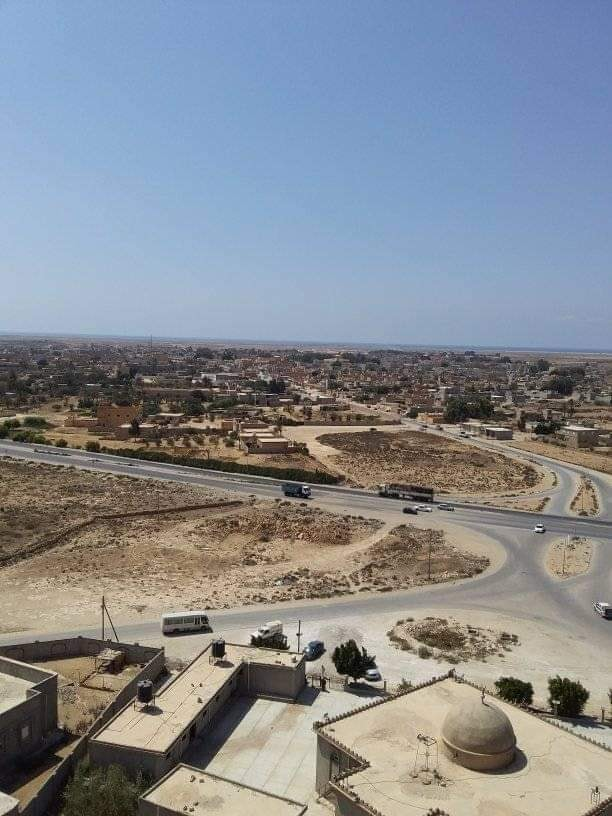
- Aerial view of Qaminis in 2019

- Location in Libya
- Coordinates: 31°39′26″N 20°00′52″E
- Country: Libya
- District: Benghazi
- Elevation: 56 ft (17 m)

Population (2006)
  - Total: 10,713
- Time zone: UTC+2 (EET)
- License Plate Code: 66

Qaminis or Ghemines (Arabic: قمينس) is a small town adjacent to the Gulf of Sidra in the Cyrenaica region of northwestern Libya. It is located about 50 km (31 mi) to the south of Benghazi, 23 km (14 mi) west of Suluq, and 6 km (3.7 mi) east of the Mediterranean coast.

Qaminis was known Chaminos, before its name was changed following its conquest by the early Muslim Caliphate in AD 642.

== See also ==
- List of cities in Libya
