= Buq Buq labor camp =

Jewish labor camp in Axis-occupied Egypt

- Italian concentration camp, labor camp
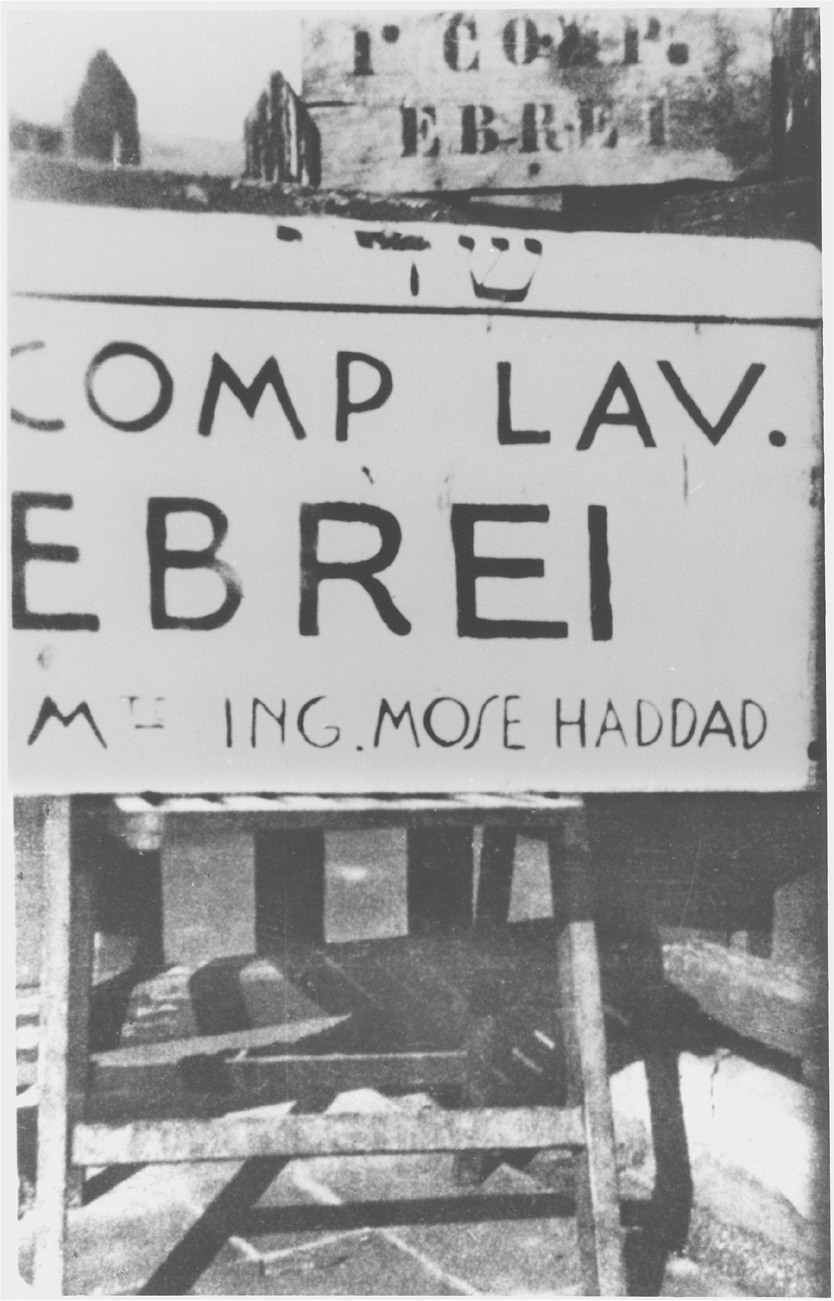
- A signboard at the entrance to Buq Buq labor camp. The Hebrew text reads "שדי" (Shaddai, meaning 'God almighty'). The abbreviated Italian text means "labor camp for Jewish workers". The name "Mose Haddad" refers to the senior overseeing prisoner of the camp, a Jewish engineer named Moshe Hadad.

- Buq Buq within Egypt
- Coordinates: 31°30′39″N 25°32′03″E
- Other names: Buqbuq, Buk Buk, Bukbuk, Bug Bug, Boq Boq, Bog Bog, Baq Baq
- Location: Buq Buq, Matrouh Governorate, Egypt
- Operated by: Fascist Italy
- Operational: Late August–November 6, 1942
- Inmates: Libyan Jewish males aged 18–45
- Number of inmates: 350 (approximate)

The labor camp at Buq Buq (Note: Transcribed variously as Buqbuq, Bukbuk, Boukbouk, Bug Bug, Buk Buk, Bog Bog, Bukbok, and Baq Baq.) was a forced labor camp for Libyan Jews, operated by Italy between August and November 1942 at the Egyptian-Libyan border in Buq Buq (بقبق) in Egypt's Matrouh Governorate. The camp was established in the context of the Axis occupation of Egypt in World War II. Buq Buq's 350 prisoners were exclusively Libyan Jewish men between the ages of 18 and 45, mostly from Tripoli and the surrounding area, who were transferred to Buq Buq from the Libyan Sidi Azaz labor camp.

== Selection of prisoners and establishment ==
The 350 Sidi Azaz laborers at Buq Buq were selected by Moshe Hadad, a Jewish engineer from Tripoli who acted as the senior overseeing prisoner (capo). Hadad had also overseen the transfer of Jews to Sidi Azaz and ensured that no heads of families were deported to labor. The selection process was conducted entirely by Jews, without Italian involvement, which Rachel Simon writes made the ordeal easier for the Jews. The camp opened at the end of August 1942, and the prisoners were sent to Buq Buq to build and repair roads to transport supplies for Axis forces between Cyrenaica and Egypt.

== Life in the camp ==
The camp was operated under the command of the commandant of Sidi Azaz, and had no permanent guard force, with an Italian military doctor being the only permanent official at the camp. The prisoners were poorly supervised, with the commandant visiting the camp to inspect it only once every few weeks. Although the camp had no fence, escape was impossible due to its location, with a road heavily trafficked by Axis troops on one side and the desert on the other.

The labor, primarily crushing boulders and transporting gravel for the road repairs, was ordered and used exclusively by the Italian military. Although the prisoners were meant to work from 7 am until after midnight, lax supervision at the camp allowed them to avoid the official schedule. Though the prisoners were nominally entitled to normal wages, this was not done in practice, and after two months the laborers received two days' wages. Prisoners resisted their internment with slowdowns and an attempt by one crew to sabotage Italian troops retreating from Egypt by closing the roads for repairs, compelling the Italians to drive off-road and sink into the mud.

The prisoners all lived in tents housing 4 to 8 men each. Malnutrition, water shortages, and the heavy labor led to widespread illness (primarily skin diseases) among the prisoners. Sick and injured laborers were transported back to Tripoli after being evaluated by the Italian military doctor, who often turned a blind eye to self-injury and feigned skin disease. These discharges caused the population of the camp to dwindle from 350 to just over 200 by the end of October.

== Dissolution ==
The camp was frequently bombed by the British Royal Air Force in late October 1942, and Hadad ordered his men to dig trenches to protect themselves. Italian forces dissolved Buq Buq and evacuated its prisoners on November 6, 1942, following the British victory of the Second Battle of El Alamein. Italy retreated to Libya, and the remaining Buq Buq prisoners were ordered back to Tripoli. With the exceptions of Hadad and a few other Jews who could fit in the doctor's military vehicle alongside all the remaining food, the freed prisoners had to trek through the Libyan Desert, across Cyrenaica, Syrtica, and Tripolitania on their own, in order to reach the city.

=== Aftermath ===
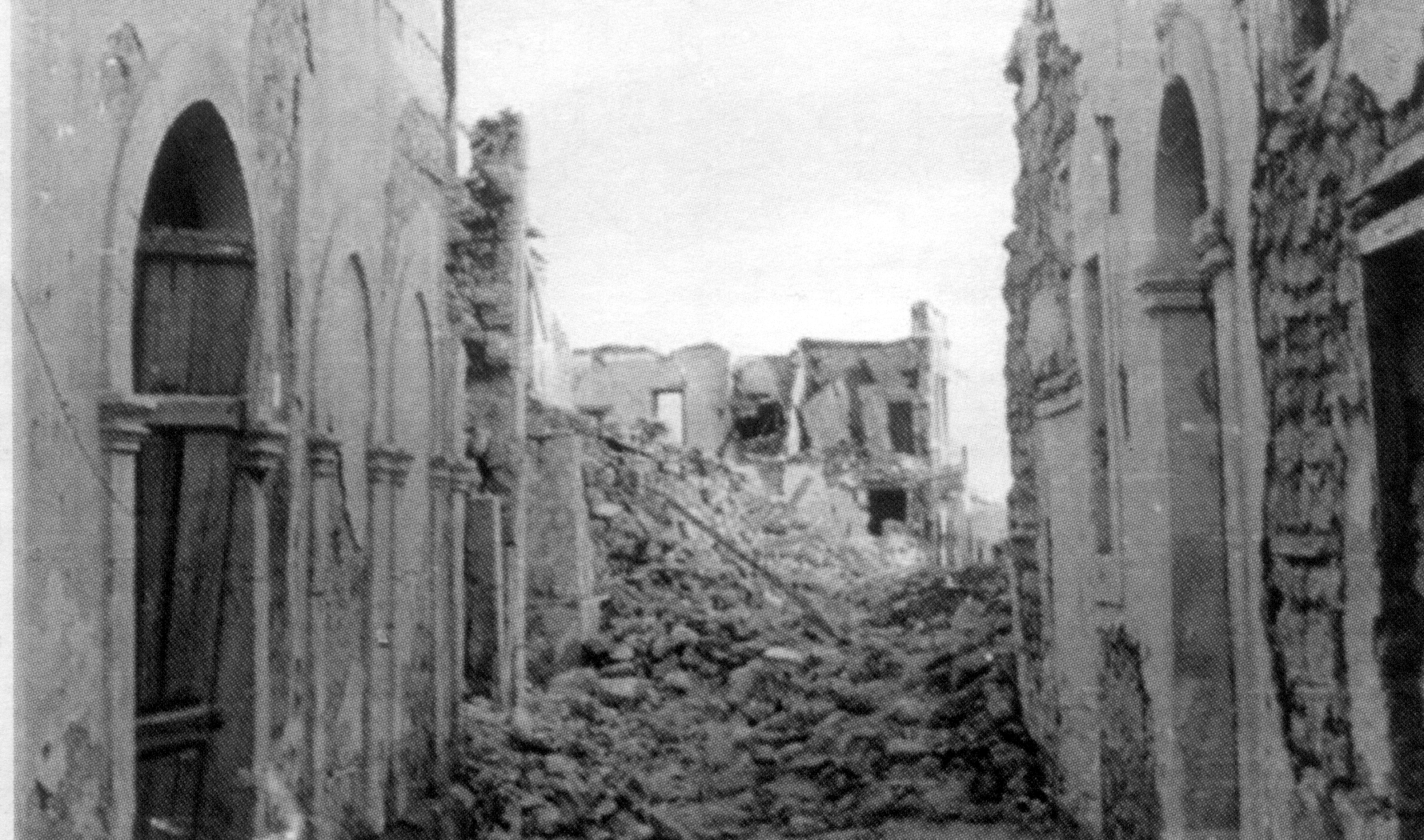
Damage from shells in the Jewish Quarter of Tripoli

The freed prisoners reached Tripoli in mid-November to find their community in chaos, with the Jewish Quarter being frequently bombed by Allied forces as the Axis retreated through it.

There have been no trials of Italian military personnel relating to Buq Buq labor camp. In 2002, Germany accepted responsibility for the imprisonment of Jews in six Libyan camps, including Buq Buq.
