= El Magrun =

El Magrun المقرون
- Village
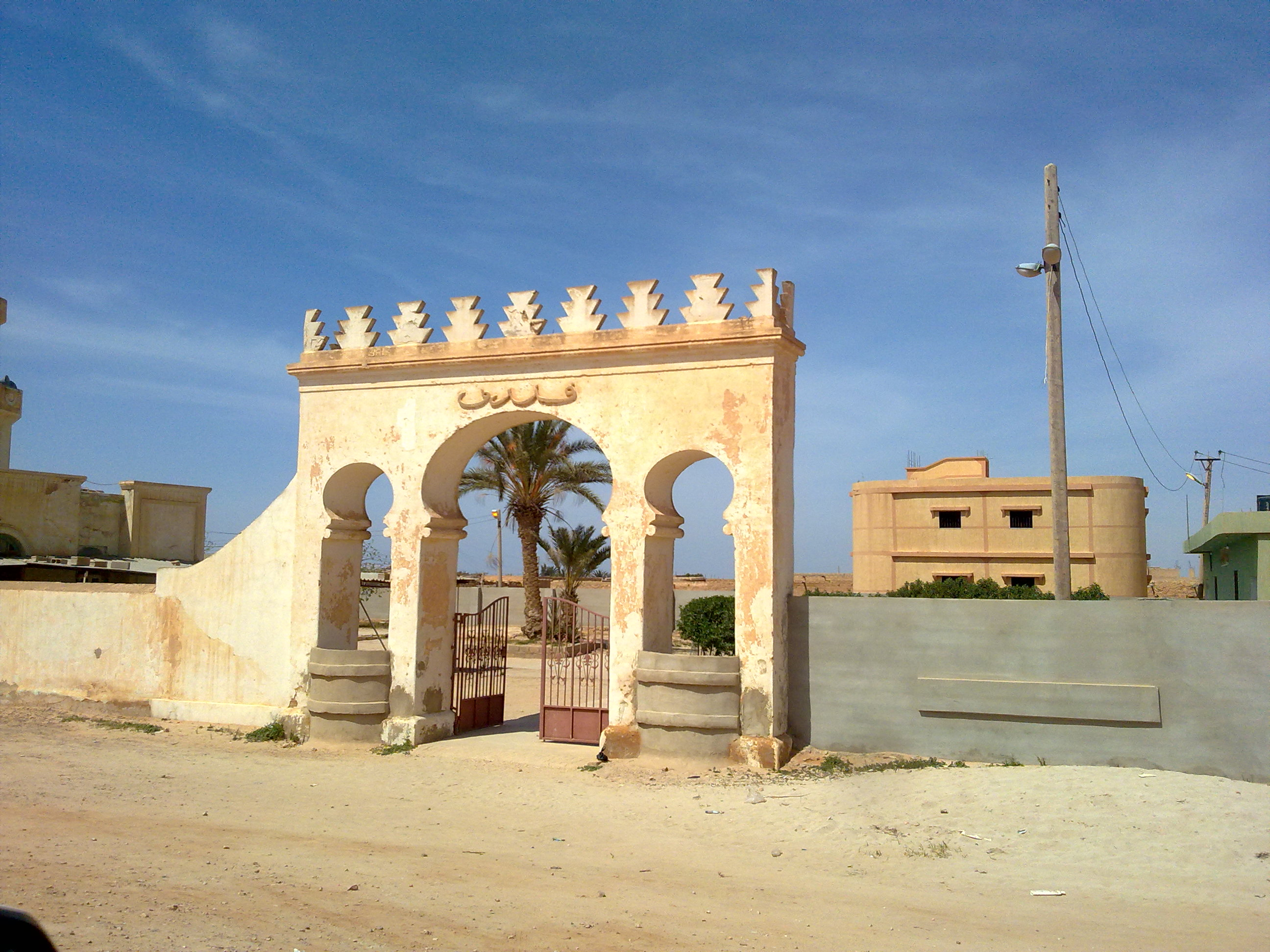
- Funduq's gate at El Magrun.

- Location in Libya
- Coordinates: 31°35′21″N 19°59′20″E
- Country: Libya
- Region: Cyrenaica
- District: Benghazi

Population (2006)
  - Total: 3,217
- Time zone: UTC + 2

El Magrun (Arabic: المقرون) is a village in the Benghazi District, of the Cyrenaica region in northeastern Libya.

== History ==
El Magrun was named after Sidi Ahmed El Magrun.

El Magrun is the site of a former Italian concentration camp for the nomadic tribes that lived in Eastern Libya (Cyrenaica), and for those in the Libyan resistance movement, during the colonial Italian North Africa and Italian Libya periods.

== Geography ==
El Magrun is located 80 km south of Benghazi and 80 km north of Ajdabiya.

The village is linked with Benghazi by two roads: The Benghazi-Qaminis-Magrun road (part of Libyan Coastal Highway), and the Benghazi-Suluq-Magrun road.
