= Suluq =

Suluq سلوق
- Town
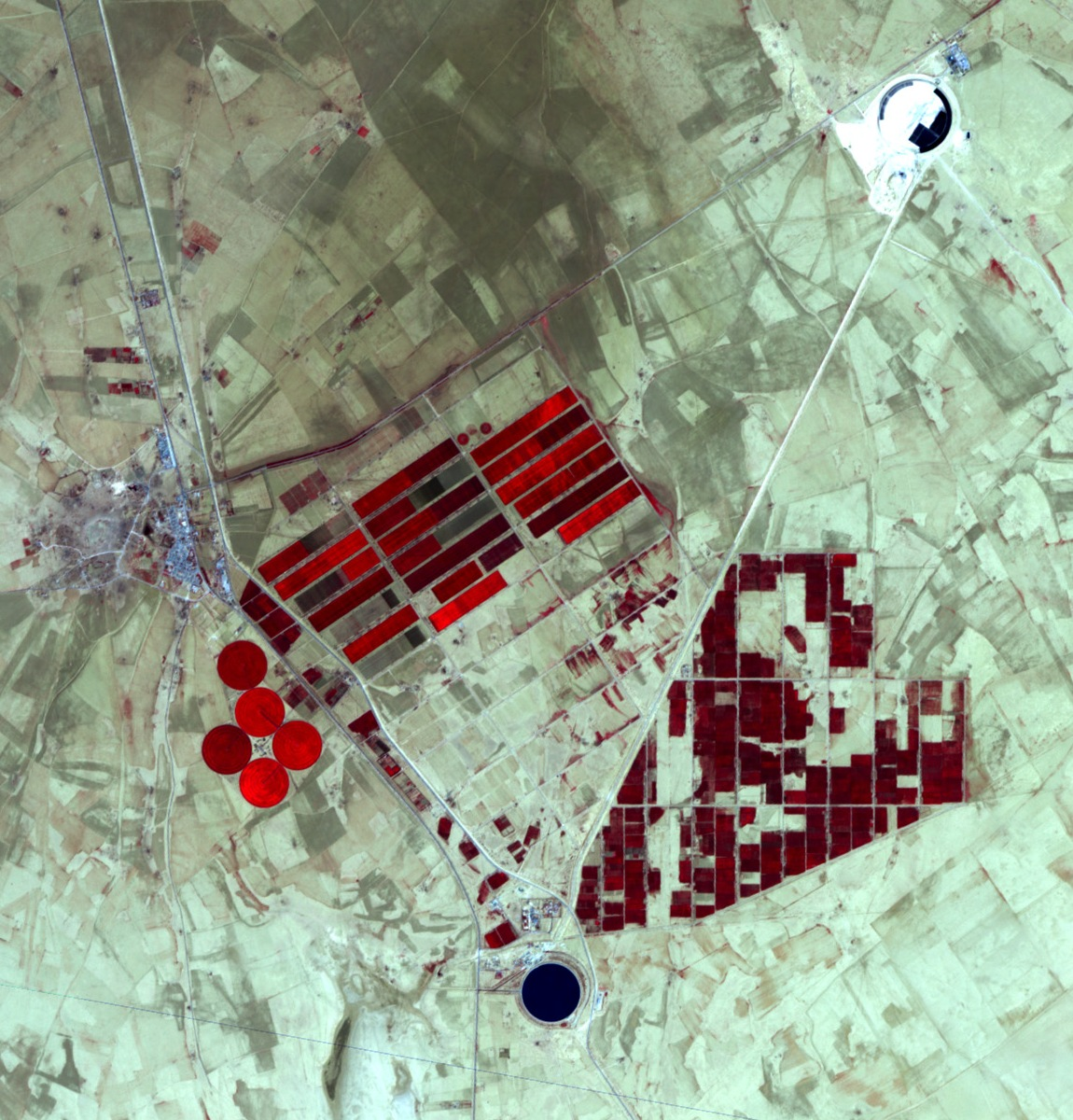
- Omar Mukhtar reservoir near Suluq

- Location in Libya
- Coordinates: 31°40′07″N 20°15′01″E
- Country: Libya
- Region: Cyrenaica
- District: Benghazi
- Elevation: 53 m (174 ft)

Population (2004)
  - Total: 15,543
- Time zone: UTC + 2
- License Plate Code: 66

Suluq (Arabic: سلوق, romanized: Sulūq) is a town in the Benghazi District of the Cyrenaica region in northeastern Libya. It is located about 53 kilometers to the south-east of Benghazi.

== Italian Libya ==
Suluq is the site of a former Italian concentration camp for the nomadic tribes that lived in Eastern Libya (Cyrenaica) during the colonial Italian North Africa and Italian Libya period. On 16 September 1931 Omar Mukhtar, the leader of the Libyan resistance movement, was hanged here.

Suluq was the southern inland terminus of a short narrow gauge railway built by the Italian Libya Railways. This line was closed around the 1960s.

== Present day ==
Suluq is on the crossroad of many roads connecting her with several inhabited places like:

1. Benghazi (to the north-west).
2. Al Abyar (to the north-east).
3. Qaminis (to the west).
4. El Magrun (to the south-west).
5. Zawiyat Msus (to the south-east).

In 2009, 5,000 new housing units were built in Suluq.

== See also ==
- List of cities in Libya
- Railway stations in Libya
