= Sidi Azaz labor camp =

Fascist Italian labour camp in Libya (1942–1943)

- Italian concentration camp, labor camp
- Sidi Azaz within Libya
- Coordinates: 32°43′41″N 13°56′00″E
- Other names: סידי עזאז ,سيدي عزاز
- Location: Sidi Azaz, Libya
- Operated by: Fascist Italy
- Operational: July 1942 – late January 1943
- Inmates: Libyan Jewish males aged 18–45
- Number of inmates: 3,000 (initial); 1,000 (after release of weak and wealthy)
- Killed: 3

The labor camp at Sidi Azaz (Note: Also Sidi Azzaz, Sidi Aziz Sidi-Hazaz, and Sidi Azzouz, now Sidi Said.) was a forced labor camp for Libyan Jews near Homs in Tripolitania. The camp was established by fascist Italy in 1942, during its occupation of Libya, and liberated by British forces in 1943. 3,000 Jewish men were initially brought to Sidi Azaz, but the majority were released, leaving approximately 1,000 prisoners to labor at the camp, mostly building railroads and repairing roads. In August 1942, 350 prisoners from Sidi Azaz were relocated to establish Buq Buq labor camp at the Egyptian border.

Three prisoners' deaths are known to have occurred at Sidi Azaz—one man shot by an Italian guard, one man in a truck accident, and one Jewish boy killed in a conflict with local Arabs.

== Establishment ==
On June 28, 1942, colonial governor of Libya Ettore Bastico issued a decree that male Jews between 18 and 45 years of age in Italian North Africa would be forced to labor. A general census of the Jewish population was taken, with all Jews having to declare their "personal data, residence, and profession" or be immediately sent to forced labor. Italian authorities planned to intern 5,000 Jews from Tripoli to build railroads and transport supplies to the war front. Preparation for exile took place during the month of Elul, traditionally a time of preparation for the High Holidays. Approximately 1,000 Jews were brought on September 2, 1942, ten days before Rosh Hashanah. In July 1942 the camp at Sidi Azaz was established with 3,000 Jewish men brought to the camp. Most of the Jews brought to Sidi Azaz were from Tripoli, but there were also "several dozen" from Homs. Prisoners suffering from serious illness or physical disability were sent home by a medical commission, and wealthier Jews were also generally released, leaving behind approximately 1,000 mostly poorer, able-bodied and specialized Jewish men to labor at Sidi Azaz. Norman Stillman attributes the release of two-thirds of the prisoners at Sidi Azaz to "poor planning by the Italians," and Stanislao Pugliese explains that the camp lacked sufficient infrastructure for the 3,000 men initially recruited.

In late August 1942, approximately 350 men at Sidi Azaz were selected by Moshe Hadad, the senior capo at the camp, to be relocated to build roads and transport supplies for Axis powers at a new labor camp at Buq Buq. Some other Jews at Sidi Azaz were transferred before the camp's liberation to an Italian military camp in suburban Tripoli.

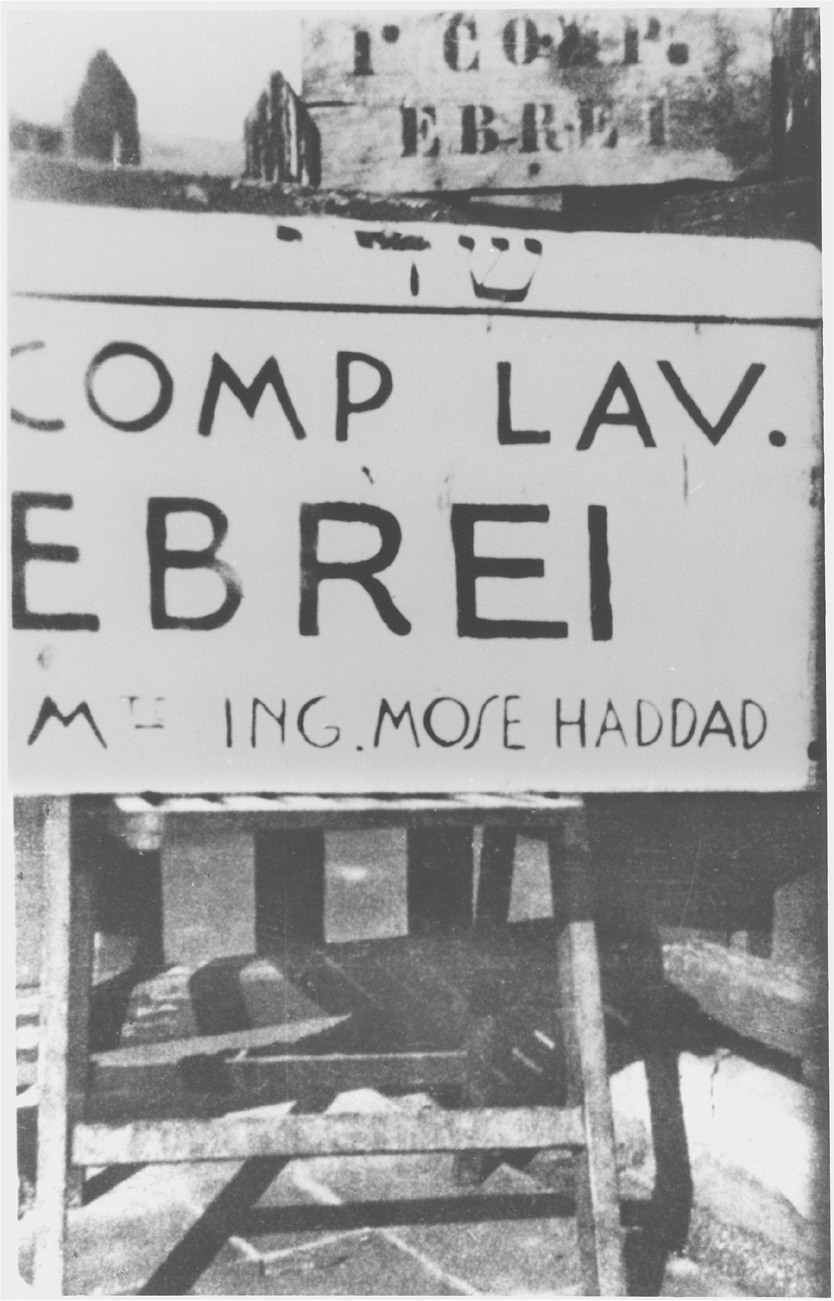
In August 1942, 350 men were relocated from Sidi Azaz to Buq Buq labor camp (sign pictured) under the oversight of senior Jewish capo Moshe Haddad.

== Conditions ==
Robert Satloff describes the camp at Sidi Azaz as "chaotic and ill-managed". The site was established in an open desert area, and featured few permanent structures. After a few months, a barbed-wire fence enclosing the camp was constructed. Survivor Amishadai Guetta describes the camp's environment as scorching hot and "pocked by snakes and scorpions".

Labor for the imprisoned mostly consisted of railway building and road repairs, though some men were assigned to kitchen and cleaning tasks in the camp itself. Men with specialized skills were employed in office work. After morning roll call, men were sent out to work in groups of approximately 50 to 60, supervised by privileged overseeing prisoners (capi) as they fulfilled their daily quotas. The workday was from 6:00 AM to 4:00 PM. The prisoners successfully lobbied to have Shabbat often recognized as a day of rest, and a "provisional synagogue" in the camp with a torah scroll is credited by historian Jens Hoppe with strengthening the resilience of the prisoners at Sidi Azaz. Ordinary inmates slept in tents of four to five men, while capi, commandants, and guards slept in barracks. Italian officers commanded the camp, while members of the Italian African Police guarded. German officers visited Sidi Azaz to inspect progress weekly. Pugliese reports that relations between the Jews and the Italian soldiers were "good, for the most part"; the two groups often ate together.

Drinking water, described by Guetta as murky, was pumped from Bedouin wells. Daily rations consisted of "approximately one pound of bread, and rice or macaroni at midday". This was occasionally supplemented by canned food, and prisoners who brought money into the camp were able to purchase food from local Arabs, including onions, dates, barley, and meat. Such trade was permitted by the camp's management. Capi also sometimes allowed individual prisoners to purchase food in Homs for the camp. Jewish and non-Jewish residents of Tripoli learned of the conditions at Sidi Azaz through the visits of prisoners' family members and members of the Jewish community. As a result, a food relief effort was organized by the deputy of the Jewish community in Tripoli, particularly targeting the weakest inmates at risk of starvation in the camp. Jens Hoppe notes a subsidy of 59,859 lire (US$498) for "militarized and requisitioned workers" at Sidi Azaz listed in the Tripoli Jewish community's 1943 financial report. No information about attempted escapes or resistance at Sidi Azaz is known.

=== Deaths ===
Information relating to deaths at Sidi Azaz is lacking, but there were probably few, considering the mostly young prisoners and the release of weak prisoners by a twice-weekly-visiting Italian Army doctor. Many inmates attempted to gain exemption from internment through bribes and self-injury.

Only one shooting of an inmate at Sidi Azaz is known: Kamos Zakani, (Note: Also romanized as Camus Zanko and Camus Zango.) employed as a clerk for the camp, was shot by an Italian guard in the context of a quarrel. The guard was not punished, but was transferred from the camp. Jewish inmates ceased arguing with the Italian soldiers following the incident. Another Jew, a father named Jakov Legovi, (Note: Also spelled Jacob Laguai.) died in a truck full of forced laborers that tipped over. There was conflict between the Jewish inmates at Sidi Azaz and Arabs local to the camp, and a Jewish boy was killed in an incident of contact with Arabs.

== Liberation and legacy ==
Following westward advances against the Axis powers in Libya, the British Eighth Army liberated the Sidi Azaz camp in late January 1943. As they journeyed home, the freed Jews were given bread and dates by Arabs, despite the Jews' inability to pay. There have been no trials for war crimes related to the Sidi Azaz camp. In 2002, Germany accepted responsibility for the imprisonment of Jews in six Libyan camps, including Sidi Azaz, allowing survivors to receive a pension from Germany via the Claims Conference.
