= Molat =

Croatian island in the Adriatic Sea

Coordinates: 44.231°N 14.841°E

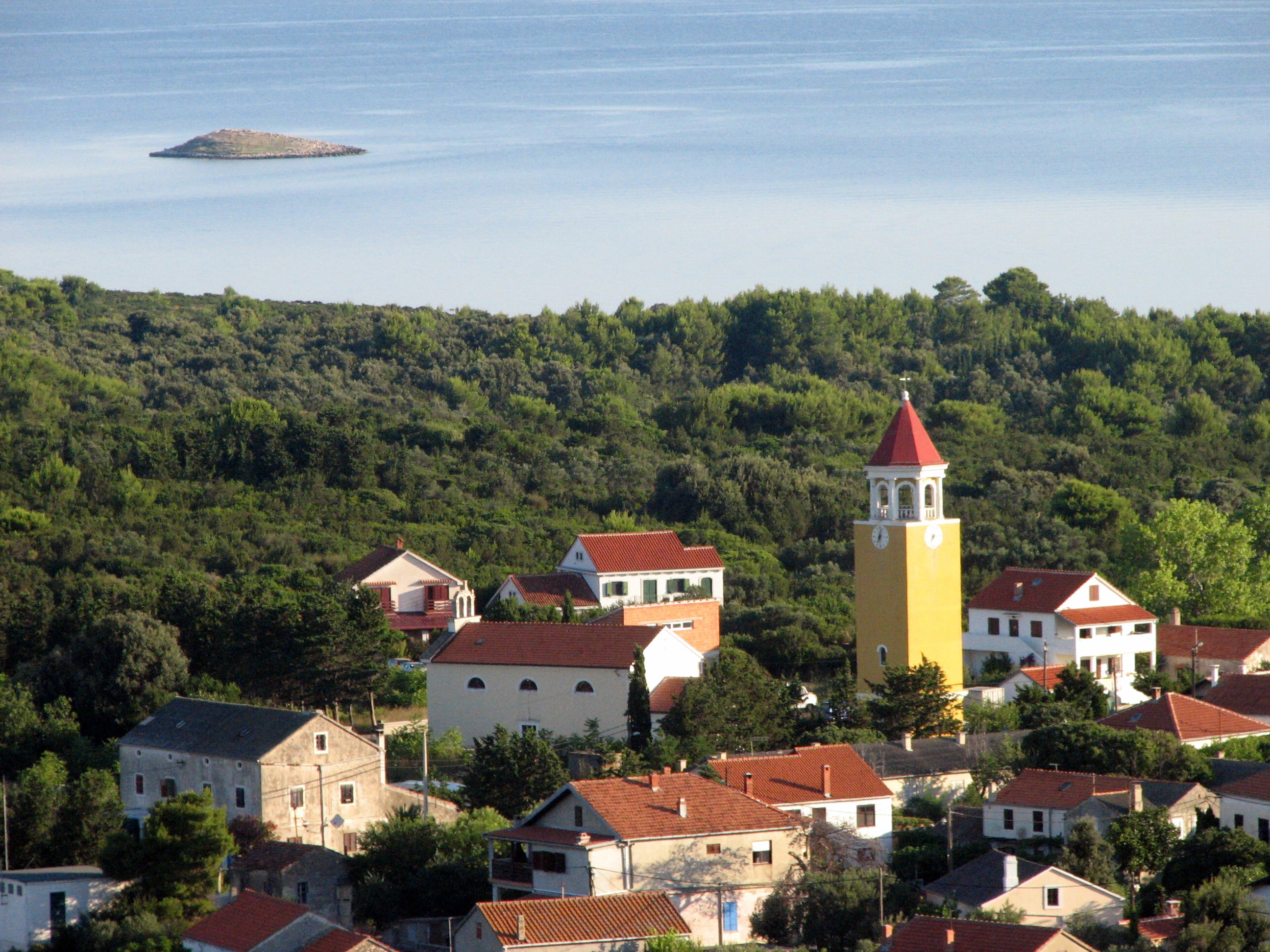
- The town of Molat

Geography
- Location: Adriatic Sea
- Area: 22.82 km^{2} (8.81 sq mi)

Administration
- Croatia
- County: Zadar County

Demographics
- Population: 197 (2011)
- Pop. density: 8.63/km^{2} (22.35/sq mi)

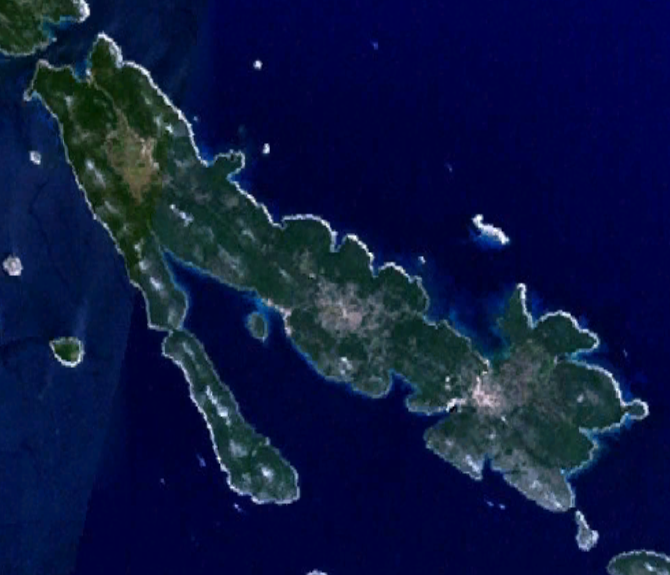
Satellite image of Molat

Molat (pronounced [mɔ̌lat]) is a Croatian island in the Adriatic Sea. It lies near Zadar, southeast of Ist, separated by the Zapuntel Strait. It has an area of 22.82 km^{2} (8.81 sq mi).

The settlements on the island are Molat (population 107), Zapuntel (pop. 42), and Brgulje (pop. 48), and they are located in the interior of the island, with only smaller hamlets on the seaside. The main industries on the island are agriculture, sheep breeding, fishing, and tourism.

== Geography and environment ==
The island is composed of lower cretaceous and eocene limestone. The north=eastern coast is mostly low and indented with numerous coves but the south western coast is largely steep. The relief is characterised by two limestone ridges, separated from each other by the Zapuntel Field (the Bay of Brgulje is its south-eastern submerged part). A smaller transversal Molat Field (Serbo-Croatian: Polje) stretches in the south-eastern part of the island. From Zapuntel, it stretches through a section called Ponikve into a valley, Draga, that leads to the village of Porat. It is mostly covered with young forests and underbrush.

=== Important Bird Area ===
The island is part of the northern Zadar Archipelago, which has been designated an Important Bird Area (IBA) by BirdLife International because it supports breeding populations of several species of fish-eating seabirds.

== History ==
Molat has been inhabited since the Stone Age. At Ledenice near Zapuntel harbour, in the far north of the island, in Zapuntelsko polje and in the east of the village of Molat, more limestone objects were found from that time. According to the name of the island it can be concluded that it was inhabited in the Neolithic era by a pre-Indoeuropean population. This form of name is widespread in the Mediterranean: Mljet, Malta (island of Veli Drvenik, island south of Sicily, hinterland near Zadar).

There are no findings from the Bronze Age. From the Iron Age there were four Illyrian fortresses: Lokardenik, Gračina, Straža and Knežak. Inside the fortress there were objects of roasted ground, limestone items, handguns, food remains (bones, snails and shells). There were also 8 stone tombs (tumulus) found. Pottery vessels imported from southern Italy were found at Gracini near Brgulje.

In Roman times, the local Liburnian population lived quite autochthonously. The existence of the Roman population is evidenced by the toponyms: Karstul, Bavkul, Maknare, Tramerka, Brgulje et al.

Upon arrival, between the seventh and tenth centuries, Croats gradually assimilated the local population. At that time, the first records of the island appeared. The oldest mention is by Constantine VII Porphyrogennetos around 950. The name Melata is mentioned in 1073, 1151, 1195, 1381, etc. Zapuntel was first mentioned in 1450 as the port of Sanpontello, and Brgulje was first mentioned in 1527 when the first Venetian census was made.

The island was donated by Count Desa in 1151 to the monastery of St. Krševan from Zadar. Old maps from 1320 and 1321 mention Molat as the great port of St. Mary (today Lučina), which was an important station on the way from Istria and Osor to Zadar.

After the conquering of Zadar by the Republic of Venice in 1409, Molat became Venetian property and was leased on a yearly basis. For the first 250 years, the lessees changed relatively often. They did not take into account the interests of the population but tried to achieve as much profit as possible, primarily by cutting the forests. Zadar's nobleman, Zuane Piccardi, introduced the ban on cutting wood for the population (even the smallest amount) punishable by a fine of 25 ducats. The Lantane landlord family survived for the longest time, from 1640 until the end of the 19th century when the Abelić family bought the property. For two centuries, with the help of commissioners, dormitories, gastropods and island mulberries, Lantane family extracted quarters, sevenths and tithes in the products. Occasionally they lived in a small, high wall enclosed palace in the village of Molat (built in 1664, after the Second World War until 1990 used as a restaurant, today is neglected). The main product was wine, and they also received oil, grain, beans, lentils, figs, cheese, brandy, skins, fish and others. The supervisors (by Lantana and Abelić) stood at the intersections of rural roads at the time of winding, noting the products brought to the landowners' warehouses.

Island was robbed by raiders and various other pirates, and the toponyms of Straža (Guard) and Stražica (Little guard) testify about the attempts of protection. It was recorded that the Turks robbed the island in 1571, and in 1684 they kidnapped and enslaved 20 inhabitants. At the beginning of the nineteenth century, English privateers attacked the island several times; for example, in 1810 they robbed and burned down the house of the Zapuntel parish priest.

In 1666, islanders complained to the General Provost in Zadar about the prerequisite measures of the landowner, but to no avail. Tariffs have become even higher. Between the two world wars, the serfdom of the island was abolished (as evidenced by the memorial plaque on the bell tower of the local church in the village of Molat, 1937). In 1926, the Cultural House was built. In 1933, the library was founded. In 1937, the island reached its maximum population of 1,083 throughout the recorded history. The population has since decreased due to emigration and urbanisation.

During the Second World War in 1942, Italian fascists at Molat established the Molat concentration camp in the bay of Jaza where 20,000-25,000 prisoners came through, of whom 500-1,000 died.

After the Second World War, the population is scattered, fewer people are concerned with tourism, fishing and very little farming. Today, the primary school (opened in 1880) is closed, there are no children on the island.
