= Massacres in the Italo-Turkish War =

Coordinates: 32°53′43.00″N 13°12′37.00″E

A series of massacres were committed by Ottoman and Italian forces during the Italo-Turkish War. In October 1911, Ottoman forces massacred captured Italian troops at Sciara Sciat (Arabic: Shar al-Shatt). In reprisal, Italian troops massacred several thousand civilians in the Mechiya oasis.

== Background ==
Italy invaded Ottoman Tripolitania (Ottoman Libya) in 1911 with the purpose of annexing the territory as an Italian colony; the Ottomans resisted the Italian invasion and the result was the Italo-Turkish War. Some Arabs collaborated with the Italians, mainly in the city of Tripoli, but those in the interior of Libya largely supported the Turks due to their shared religion. During the war Italian troops used indiscriminate violence many times to subdue the native civilians.

== Sciara Sciat massacre ==
On 23 October 1911, Italian troops were attacked by a 10,000-strong Ottoman force while marching through the Mechiya oasis, at a place called Sciara Sciat. Some accounts stated that Turkish forces captured two companies of the Italian infantry in a nearby cemetery and massacred 503 men.

I saw (in Sciara Sciat) in one mosque seventeen Italians, crucified with their bodies reduced to the status of bloody rags and bones, but whose faces still retained traces of their hellish agony. Long rods had been passed through the necks of these wretched men and their arms rested on these rods. They were then nailed to the wall and died slowly with untold suffering. It is impossible for us to paint the picture of this hideous rotted meat hanging pitifully on the bloody wall. In a corner another body was crucified, but as an officer he was chosen to experience refined sufferings. His eyes were stitched closed. All the bodies were mutilated and castrated; so indescribable was the scene and the bodies appeared swollen as shapeless carrion. But that's not all! In the cemetery of Chui, which served as a refuge from the Turks and to whence soldiers retreated from afar, we could see another show. In front of one door near the Italian trenches five soldiers had been buried up to their shoulders, their heads emerged from the black sand stained with their blood: heads horrible to see and there you could read all the tortures of hunger and thirst.

Gaston Leroux, correspondent of "Matin-Journal"

Italian corpses were allegedly nailed to trees with their eyes and genitals mutilated, some claim in possible retaliation for sexual offenses against local women perpetrated by the Italian troops.

== Mechiya oasis massacre ==
On the next day, the Italian military responded by attacking the population of the neighboring Mechiya oasis, massacring about 4,000 people including women and children over the course of three days. Though the Italians allegedly took measures to prevent news of this action from reaching the outside world, foreign press correspondents covered the event in detail. This negative coverage factored into the British Parliament's decision later that month to take a more pro-Turkish course, rejecting a proposed Anglo-Italian Mediterranean agreement.

== Contemporary accounts ==
Following the events, contemporary accounts supporting and opposing the Italian actions took opposing views of the incident:

For three days the oasis was given over to massacre in wholesale and detail. Some 4,000 men, women and children perished in the course of it – the vast bulk of whom were certainly innocent of any participation whatever in the Italian defeat. They were murdered in the streets, in their houses, farms, gardens, and according to a peculiarly horrible narrative by a British officer serving with the Turkish forces, in a mosque, where several hundred women and children had taken refuge. ... All the newspaper correspondents were in agreement as to the main facts.

Opposing arguments decried the foreign press reporting as overblown:

The wildest accusations launched against the Italian troops by half a dozen hysterial – and to put it mildly – inaccurate journalists, most of whom spoke not a word of Italian or Arabic, found ready credence, and the cry of "Italian atrocities" was raised with great effect. ... It must of course be remembered that many of the people who in England were shrieking against Italy, people who had no notion of the meaning of evidence, were the same who, during the Boer war, had shrieked against England, and talked about British "methods of barbarism"...

== Commemoration ==
A monument to the Italian infantrymen killed at Sciara Sciat, sculpted by Publio Morbiducci, was erected at the Piazzale di Porta Pia in 1932.
