= Libyan genocide (1929–1934) =

1929–1934 genocide of Libyan Arabs by Italian colonial authorities

- Part of the Second Italo-Senussi War and the Italian colonization of Libya
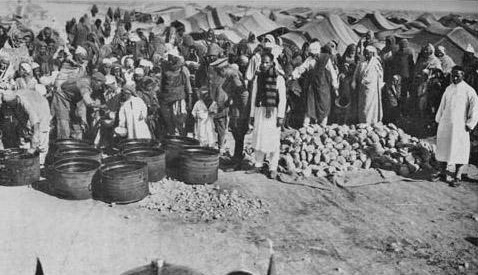
- Inmates at the Sid Ahmed el Maghrun concentration camp
- Location: Italian Libya
- Date: 1929–1934
- Target: Libyans
- Attack type: Genocide, ethnic cleansing, mass killings, forced displacement, death marches, settler colonialism, chemical warfare, concentration camps, no quarter, and scorched earth
- Deaths: 20,000–100,000
- Perpetrator: Fascist Italy
- Motive: Italian fascism, fascist imperialism, settler colonialism, anti-Arab racism

The Libyan genocide, also known in Libya as Shar (Arabic: شر, lit. 'Evil'), was the genocide of Libyan Arabs and the systematic destruction of Libyan culture during and after the Second Italo-Senussi War between 1929 and 1934. During this period, between 20,000 and 100,000 Libyans were killed by Italian colonial authorities under Benito Mussolini. Nearly 50% of the population of Cyrenaica was deported and interned in concentration camps, resulting in a population decline down to 142,000 from an initial 225,000. A motive for the genocide was the settlement of Italians in Libya, which proceeded in 1934 under colonial governor Italo Balbo, who brought 20,000 settlers to Libya in 1938.

This period was marked by widespread Italian war crimes, including mass killings, ethnic cleansing, forced displacement, death marches, chemical warfare, concentration camps and refusing to take prisoners of war. The indigenous population, particularly the nomadic Bedouin tribes, faced extreme violence and suppression in an attempt to quell Senussi resistance to colonial rule, whose population was reduced by half.

News about the genocide was heavily suppressed by Fascist Italy. Evidence was largely destroyed, making remaining files in Italian concentration camps in Libya difficult to find even after the end of Fascist rule in Italy in 1945. The only camp with a record of prisoners is the Swani al-Tariya camp. However, the mass graves still attest to the genocide. In 2008 Italy apologized for its killing, destruction and repression of the Libyan people during its colonization of Libya. According to some historians, the Libyan genocide had links to the Holocaust as the death camps were visited by Nazi notables like Heinrich Himmler and Hermann Göring.

== Prelude ==
During the Italian invasion of Libya in 1911, the Italians were portrayed as the liberators of Libya from Ottoman rule, concurrently concealing any evidence of repression campaigns and massacres during the war, such as the ones following the battle and massacre at Shar al-Shatt. On the other side, the Arabs were described as 'beasts' that needed to be civilized by the Europeans. Reportedly, both Italian officers and men had declared that "we must destroy the Arabs". Official reports into the atrocities emphasized racial hatred, vindictiveness and "psychological flaws" as their underlying causes. Such Italian war crimes in Libya were primarily associated with the Fascist era, but they also occurred during the Liberal period, albeit in a less systematic manner. Upon gaining entry in Libya, Italy promptly initiated racist and discriminatory practices of class division, including the construction of concentration camps, where approximately 50,000 Libyans lost their lives during the 1930s. Libya was of strategic importance to Italy, thus prompting the latter to annex the former as its "Fourth Shore" to allow Italians an expanded trade route area which greatly benefited Italy.

== Motivation ==
Italy's colonisation of Libya was motivated by a desire to compete with other European powers, who had their own colonies. Libya was one of the last African countries to be colonised, along with Abyssinia. Additionally, Libya was viewed as the Fourth Shore, Mussolini's concept of a Greater Italy that harkens back to the Roman Empire. Libya in other words was viewed as a settler colonial state, akin to French Algeria.

Italo Balbo, field marshal and an architect of the colony, brought 20,000 settlers to Libya in 1938 and planned on settling 500,000 Italians by the 1960s, particularly in the Jabal al Akhdar region ("Green Mountains" in Arabic) by displacing the local Libyan population to the desert. Jabal al Akhdar was chosen for settlement as it is a fertile region in an otherwise dry location, providing conditions for agriculture.

== Death marches ==
The most common case of forced displacement was from the Jabal al Akhdar region, to make way for Italian settlers, to Sirte, an inhospitable city on the edge of the Sahara desert. There were also several displacements from oases to the Sahara desert proper; such as the Magharba, and Zuwayya, Fawakhir, Firjan, and Hussun tribes who lived near Ijdabiyya, west of Benghazi. These displacements were harsh with a high mortality rate, done under the coercion of the Italian Army who were given orders to kill any person or animal who did not hurry. These arduous marches, if survived, took Libyans to their final destination in one of the main 16 concentration camps. Coupling these marches with the mass famine that was induced by the intentional killing of nearly all cattle, drove many to their deaths.

Sa’ad Salim al-’Amruni, born in 1924, recounted the marches:

We were ordered to march from the Oasis of Jalu for seven days without water and food, and they treated us like animals until we were interned at al-Abyar camp. Like others, the deported were harshly treated and anybody who [slowed] down was whipped or shot. Many elders and some young children died during the deportation. The army took our animals and out of the 70 camels we were allowed to keep only five. It is clear that the Italian army marched some to the ports of Derna, Toukra, Susa, and Benghazi, then shipped [them] by sea to Braiga and Agaila, while others were forced to march on foot or ride camels to the camps.

== Death camps ==
Evans-Pritchard, an expert on Cyrenaica, wrote, "In this bleak country, in the summer of 1930, 80,000 men, women, and children, and 600,000 beasts were herded into the smallest camps possible. Hunger, disease, and broken hearts took a heavy toll of the imprisoned population. Bedouins died in a cage. Loss of livestock was also great, for the beasts had insufficient grazing near the camps on which to support life, and the herds, already decimated in the fighting are almost wiped out by the camps."

It was in Slug camp that Omar al-Mukhtar was hanged in front of 20,000 interned civilians, to send a message to the native people, on September 11, 1931. A shrine to commemorate Omar al-Mukhtar is found there today, after a Libyan located his body by witnessing al-Mukhtar's secret burial by the Italians after he was hanged.

== Genocide ==
On 20 June 1930, Italian military officer Pietro Badoglio called for the annihilation of the entire population of Cyrenaica, and wrote to General Rodolfo Graziani: "As for overall strategy, it is necessary to create a significant and clear separation between the controlled population and the rebel formations. I do not hide the significance and seriousness of this measure, which might be the ruin of the subdued population...But now the course has been set, and we must carry it out to the end, even if the entire population of Cyrenaica must perish".

According to Melvin Page and Penny Sonneberg, Benito Mussolini was the person ultimately responsible for "putting 80,000 Libyans in concentration camps, blocking and poisoning wells, building a network of garrisons in troubled areas, bombing villages with mustard gas, killing and confiscating hundreds of thousands of sheep and camels, and constructing a 200-mile barbed wire fence between Libya and Egypt to prevent rebel border crossings".

By 1931, more than half of the population of Cyrenaica was confined to 16 Italian concentration camps where many died as result of overcrowding, lack of water, food and medicine. Italian colonial authorities forcibly expelled 100,000 Eastern Libyan Bedouins, half the population of Cyrenaica, from their settlements that were given to Italian colonist settlers, an action that has been described as ethnic cleansing. Less than 40,000 Libyan survivors left Italian refugee camps following their release in 1934.

Destruction of animal populations in Cyrenaica, 1910–1933
	1910	1926	1933
Sheep and goats	126,000	80,000	22,000
Camels	83,000	75,000	2,600
Horses	27,000	14,000	1,000
Cattle	23,000	10,000	2,000

== Death toll ==
Estimates of the total number of deaths vary substantially, and range between 20,000 and 100,000. (Note: Estimations of death tolls include: 20,000; 40,000; "more than 40,000"; 40,000–70,000; 50,000; 100,000) The total population of Cyrenaica declined by around one third, a decrease of approximately 83,000. In addition to the deaths in the camps and during deportation, 12,000 people were executed on suspicion of being rebels in 1930 and 1931.

Assessment of the total death toll is difficult. Much of the documentation was destroyed by the Italian colonial authorities, the archives remain difficult to search, and news of the atrocities was suppressed. Varying estimations of the Libyan population are also a problem; the Ottoman census of 1911, which reports populations of roughly 200,000 in Cyrenaica, (Note: Other estimates of the Cyrenaican population in 1911 put it higher, at 250,000.) and 576,000 in Tripolitania and Fezzan, did not include many people outside of the towns and cities, as resources and political control were lacking. Numbers given for the total Libyan population in 1911, just prior to the Italo-Turkish War, range between 800,000, 1.0 million, and 1.5 million. (Note: This highest figure of 1.5 million has been criticised as "simply wrong".) At the start of the "pacification" campaign in 1929, the Cyrenaican population was estimated at 225,000, and by the end had decreased to 142,000. By the mid-late 1930s, the population of Libya was estimated at between 700,000 and 888,400, which included an increasing number of Italian settlers—64,000 by 1936 and 110,000 by 1940.

Many Libyans also went into exile, further contributing to the significant decline in population, estimated to be at least 20,000. Historian Ali Abdullatif Ahmida writes that some 250,000 Libyans left the country during the entire period from the start of the Italo-Turkish war in 1911 to the end of Italian governance in 1943, following the success of the Western Desert campaign.

The Bedouin population of Libya was reduced by half, with around 100,000 dead or in exile, though Ilan Pappé suggests that this 100,000 was killed either directly or in the camps.

After coming to power in Libya in 1969, Muammar Gaddafi frequently claimed that half of Libya's total population had died during Italian colonialism, up 750,000 Libyans, though this is without evidence. During the Allied administration of Libya prior to independence, the United Nations estimated that 250,000 to 300,000 Libyan natives died under the Italians between 1912 and 1942 from all non-natural causes (e.g. combat, execution, disease, famine, and thirst). Ali Abdullatif Ahmida suggests this figure is higher, at 500,000.

== Links to the Holocaust ==
There are ample direct connections between the Libyan genocide and the Holocaust. Italian-sponsored Arabic language publications, most notably "Libya al-Musawara", and films from the colonial period indicate numerous visits to Libya by officials from Nazi Germany. Historian Ali Abdullatif Ahmida stated that the extreme violence carried out against Libyans by Italian fascists served as a blueprint for the atrocities that Nazi Germany later committed in Europe.

In April 1939, German Field Marshal Hermann Göring made an official visit to Tripoli, where he held discussions with the Italian colonial governor general of Libya, Italo Balbo. Upon witnessing the cleansing of indigenous people and the settling of 20,000 Italian peasants, he described the process as "successful" and used it as inspiration for Generalplan Ost, the planned German settler colonization and genocide of Eastern Europe. Hermann Göring would later be in charge of the first ever Nazi concentration camp. Also in 1939, Heinrich Himmler, the head of the Schutzstaffel and the architect behind the concentration camps, also made an official visit to Libya to witness the outcomes of the Italian methods. He is credited with conceiving the idea of the Final Solution.

Historian Patrick Bernhard notes that the Nazi Commissariat organised special programmes to visit the Libyan colony. Visits to Tripoli occurred in 1937 and 1938 by high Nazi leaders such as Robert Ley, Rudolf Hess, the head of the SS Heinrich Himmler, and Marshal Hermann Göring. This led to the signing of an agreement to train 150 SS officers in the Italian Colonial School in Tivoli or Rome in 1937. Additionally, German state officials began an active program of fieldwork, examining the Italian colonial experience, contacting Italian officials and conducting fieldwork visits to Italy and the colony of Libya between 1938 and 1941, with numerous German books and press articles published during this time.

== Legacy ==
In addition to the human toll, an important legacy of the Libyan genocide is the reframing of colonial history, seeing events that happened in Africa as a precursor to the abuses of totalitarian regimes in Europe, in particular Nazi Germany.

Hannah Arendt would be the first notable scholar to provide a link between colonial genocide in Africa and the Holocaust, describing the abuses during the Scramble for Africa as "Some fundamental aspects of this time appear so close to the totalitarian phenomena of the twentieth century that it may be justifiable to consider the whole period a preparatory stage for coming catastrophes". Although Arendt's focus was primarily on Belgian atrocities in the Congo, it is this idea that has been further followed up in recent scholarship like in "Genocide in Libya: Shar, a Hidden Colonial History" by Ali Abdullatif Ahmida and Patrick Bernhard in "Borrowing from Mussolini: Nazi Germany's Colonial Aspirations in the Shadow of Italian Expansion".

== See also ==
- Genocide definitions
- Genocide Convention
- Outline of genocide studies
- Algerian genocide
- Atrocities in the Congo Free State
- Herero and Nama genocide
- Cambodian genocide
- Rwandan genocide
- Gaza genocide
