= Italian Libya =

1934–1943 Italian colony in North Africa

Libya Libia (Italian) ليبيا (Arabic) Lībyā
- 1934–1943
- Flag Coat of Arms
- Motto: Per l'onore d'Italia "For the honour of Italy"
- Anthem: Marcia Reale d'Ordinanza "Royal March of Ordinance" Marcia Reale
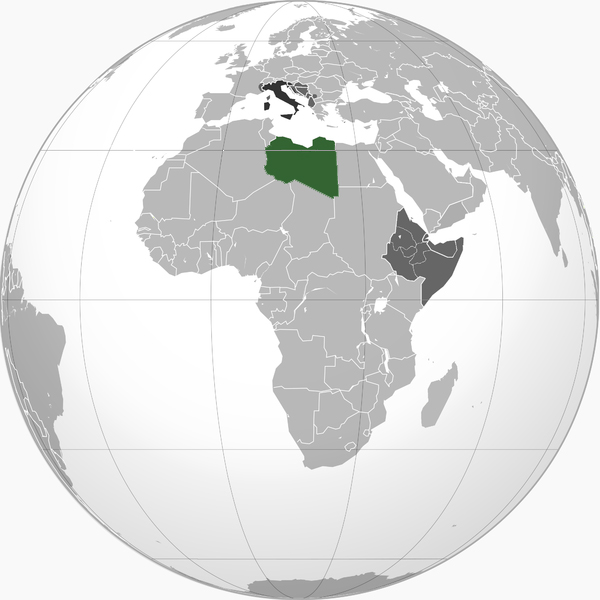
- Italian Libya in 1941: Libya Italian-controlled territory Kingdom of Italy
- Status: Colony of Italy
- Capital: Tripoli
- Common languages: Italian (official), Arabic, Berber languages, Domari
- Religion: Islam, Coptic Orthodoxy, Judaism, Catholicism
- Monarch
  - 1934–1943: Victor Emmanuel III
- Governor-General
  - 1934–1940: Italo Balbo
  - 1940–1941: Rodolfo Graziani
  - 1941: Italo Gariboldi
  - 1941–1943: Ettore Bastico
  - 1943 (acting): Giovanni Messe
- History
  - Unification of Tripolitania and Cyrenaica: 1 January 1934
  - Coastal regions part of metropolitan Italy: 9 January 1939
  - End of Italian rule: 13 May 1943
  - Relinquished by Italy: 10 February 1947 (Note: Italian rule ended in 1943 with the Allied occupation of Libya; its de jure end was in 1947 with the Treaty of Paris)

Area
- 1939: 1,759,541 km^{2} (679,363 sq mi)

Population
  - 1939: 893,774
- Currency: Italian lira
Preceded by
Italian Tripolitania
Italian Cyrenaica
Anglo-Egyptian Sudan
French Equatorial Africa
Succeeded by
British Military; Administration
Fezzan-Ghadames Military Territory
- Today part of: Libya; Chad; Niger

Libya (Italian: Libia; Arabic: ليبيا الايطالية, romanized: Lībyā al-Īṭālīya) was a colony of the Kingdom of Italy (Fascist Italy) located in North Africa, in what is now modern Libya, between 1934 and 1943. It was formed from the unification of the colonies of Cyrenaica and Tripolitania, which had been Italian possessions since 1911.

From 1911 until the establishment of a unified colony in 1934, the territory of the two colonies was sometimes referred to as "Italian Libya" or Italian North Africa (Africa Settentrionale Italiana, or ASI). Both names were also used after the unification, with Italian Libya becoming the official name of the newly combined colony. Through its history, various infrastructure projects, most notably roads, railways and villages were set up, as well as archeology. It had a population of around 150,000 Italians.

The Italian colonies of Tripolitania and Cyrenaica were taken by Italy from the Ottoman Empire during the Italo-Turkish War of 1911–1912, and run by Italian governors. In 1923, indigenous rebels associated with the Senussi Order organized the Libyan resistance movement against Italian settlement in Libya, mainly in Cyrenaica. The rebellion was put down by Italian forces in 1932, after the pacification campaign, which resulted in the deaths of a quarter of Cyrenaica's population. In 1934, the colonies were unified by governor Italo Balbo, with Tripoli as the capital. In 1937, the colony was divided into four provinces, and two years later the coastal provinces became a part of metropolitan Italy as the Fourth Shore.

During World War II, Italian Libya became the setting for the North African Campaign. Although the Italians were defeated there by the Allies in 1943, many of the Italian settlers still remained in Libya. Libya was administered by the United Kingdom and France until its independence in 1951, though Italy did not officially relinquish its claim until the 1947 Paris Peace Treaty.

== History ==
=== Pre-unification of Tripolitania and Cyrenaica (1911–1934) ===
==== Conquest and pacification ====
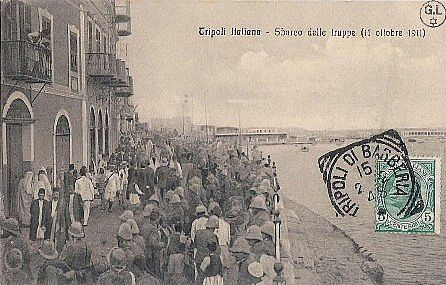
The Italian Army landing at the Port of Tripoli, 1911

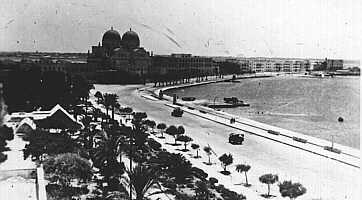
Italian Benghazi, where the "Lungomare" (sea-walk) and many other buildings were constructed

Italian efforts to colonise Libya began in 1911, and were characterised initially by major struggles with Muslim native Libyans that lasted until 1931. During this period, the Italian government controlled only the coastal areas. Between 1911 and 1912, over 1,000 Somalis from Mogadishu, the then capital of Italian Somaliland, served in combat units along with Eritrean and Italian soldiers in the Italo-Turkish War. Most of the Somali troops remained in Libya until they were transferred back to Italian Somaliland in preparation for the invasion of Ethiopia in 1935.

After the Italian Empire's conquest of Ottoman Tripolitania (Ottoman Libya), in the 1911–12 Italo-Turkish War, much of the early colonial period had Italy waging a war of subjugation against Libya's population. Ottoman Turkey surrendered its control of Libya in the 1912 Treaty of Lausanne, but fierce resistance to the Italians continued from the Senussi political-religious order, a strongly nationalistic group of Sunni Muslims. Although resistance to the Italian colonisers was less prevalent in Tripolitania than Cyrenaica (which waged significant guerilla warfare), a resistance group did form the short-lived Tripolitanian Republic in 1918. They didn't succeed in setting up a republic, and Italian rule was restored four years later. Relations between the Senussi Order and the newly established Tripolitanian Republic were acrimonious; the Senussi attempted to militarily extend their power into eastern Tripolitania, resulting in a pitched battle at Bani Walid in which the Senussi were forced to withdraw back into Cyrenaica. Following the death of Tripolitanian leader Ramadan Asswehly in August 1920, the Republic descended into civil war. Many tribal leaders in the region recognized that this discord was weakening the region's chances of attaining full autonomy from Italy, and in November 1920 they met in Gharyan to bring an end to the violence. Idris feared that Italy under its new Fascist leader Benito Mussolini would militarily retaliate against the Senussi Order, and so he went into exile in Egypt in December 1922.

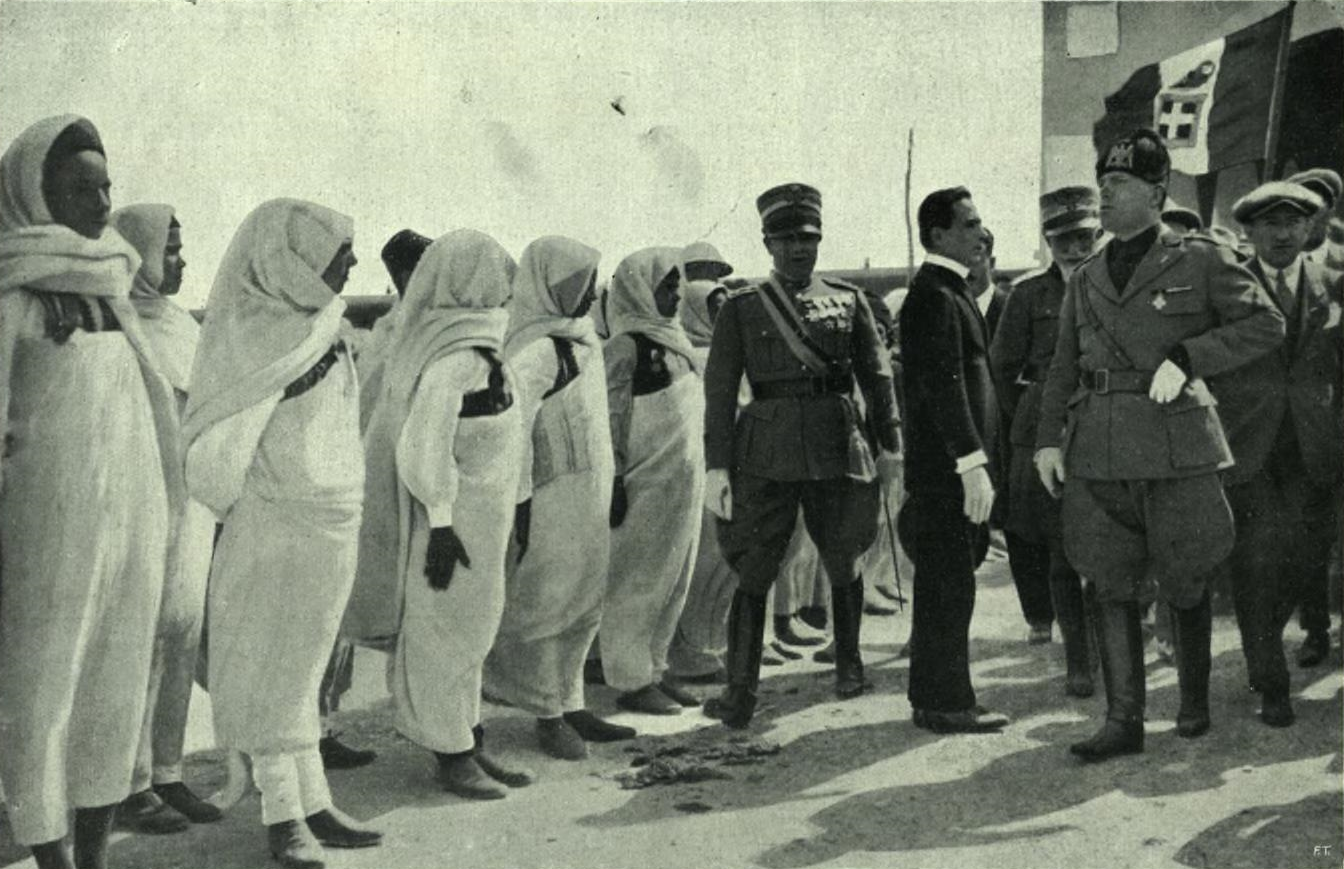
Benito Mussolini meeting local notables in Sabratha, 1926

Under the leadership of Omar al-Mukhtar, native troops associated with the Senussi led the Libyan resistance movement in 1923 against Italian settlement in Libya. Italian forces under Generals Pietro Badoglio and Rodolfo Graziani waged punitive pacification campaigns using chemical weapons and mass executions of soldiers and civilians; Senussi troops reacted with the raiding of animals and intimidation against the Libyan tribes who had submitted to the Italians, such as on November 29, 1927, when they attacked a Braasa tribe camp near Slonta, which also affected women and children. One-quarter of Cyrenaica's population of 225,000 people died during the conflict. The Italian occupation also reduced livestock numbers, killing, confiscating or driving the animals from their pastoral land to inhospitable land near the concentration camps. The number of sheep fell from 810,000 in 1926 to 98,000 in 1933, goats from 70,000 to 25,000 and camels from 75,000 to 2,000.

Thousands of Libyans joined the Italian colonial troops during the conflict, which included the native Savari, Spahi and Meharist soldiers. From 1930 to 1931, 12,000 Cyrenaicans were executed and all the nomadic peoples of northern Cyrenaica were forcibly removed from the region and relocated to huge concentration camps in the Cyrenaican lowlands. Fascist regime propaganda proclaimed the camps as hygienic and efficiently run oases of modern civilization. However, in reality the camps had poor sanitary conditions and an average of about 20,000 Bedouins, together with their camels and other animals, crowded into an area of one square kilometre. The camps held only rudimentary medical services, with the camps of Soluch and Sisi Ahmed el Magrun with an estimated 33,000 internees having only one doctor between them. Typhus and other diseases spread rapidly in the camps as the people were physically weakened by meagre food rations and forced labour. By the time the camps closed in September 1933, 40,000 of the 100,000 total internees had died in the camps. Italian authorities committed ethnic cleansing by forcibly expelling 100,000 Bedouin Cyrenaicans, almost half the population of Cyrenaica, from their settlements, slated to be given to Italian settlers. After nearly two decades of suppression campaigns the Italian colonial forces claimed victory.

==== Territorial agreements with European powers and the Kingdom of Egypt ====
Expansion of Italian Libya: territories ceded by the Ottoman Empire in 1912 territories ceded by France in 1919 Kufra District ceded by Egypt in 1919, conquered in 1931 (Note: The territory was under dispute of ownership between Italy and the Kingdom of Egypt, and it was officially conquered by Italy in 1931) territories ceded by Egypt in 1926 territories ceded by Britain and Egypt in 1934 territories ceded by France in 1935

Italian Libya expanded after concessions from the Anglo-Egyptian Sudan and a territorial agreement with the Kingdom of Egypt. The Kufra District was nominally part of Egypt until 1925, but served de facto as a headquarters for the Senussi until conquered by the Italians in 1931. Although the Italians received no former German colonies from the Paris Peace Conference, as compensation Britain gave them the Oltre Giuba and France agreed to transfer some Saharan territories to Italian Libya. After prolonged discussions through the 1920s, in 1935 under the Mussolini-Laval agreement Italy received the Aouzou strip, which was added to Libya. However, this agreement was not ratified later by France.

In 1931, the towns of El Tag and Al Jawf were taken over by Italy. Egypt ceded Kufra and Jarabub districts to Italian Libya on December 6, 1925, but it was not until the early 1930s that Italy was in full control of the place. In 1931, during the campaign of Cyrenaica, General Rodolfo Graziani easily conquered Kufra District, considered a strategic region, leading about 3,000 soldiers from infantry and artillery, supported by about twenty bombers. Ma'tan as-Sarra was turned over to Italy in 1934 as part of the Sarra Triangle to colonial Italy by the Anglo-Egyptian Condominium, who considered the area worthless and so an act of cheap appeasement to Benito Mussolini's attempts at an empire. During this time, the Italian colonial forces built a World War I–style fort in El Tag in the mid-1930s.

=== Foundation of Italian Libya: Unification and Fourth Shore (1934–1943) ===
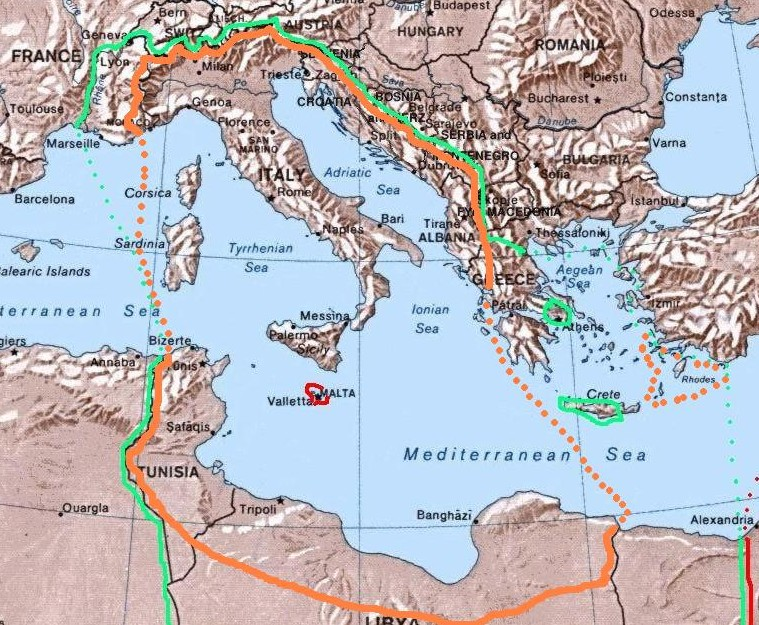
Italian Libya as the Fourth Shore was the southern part of "Imperial Italy" (orange borders), a Fascist project to enlarge Italy's national borders.

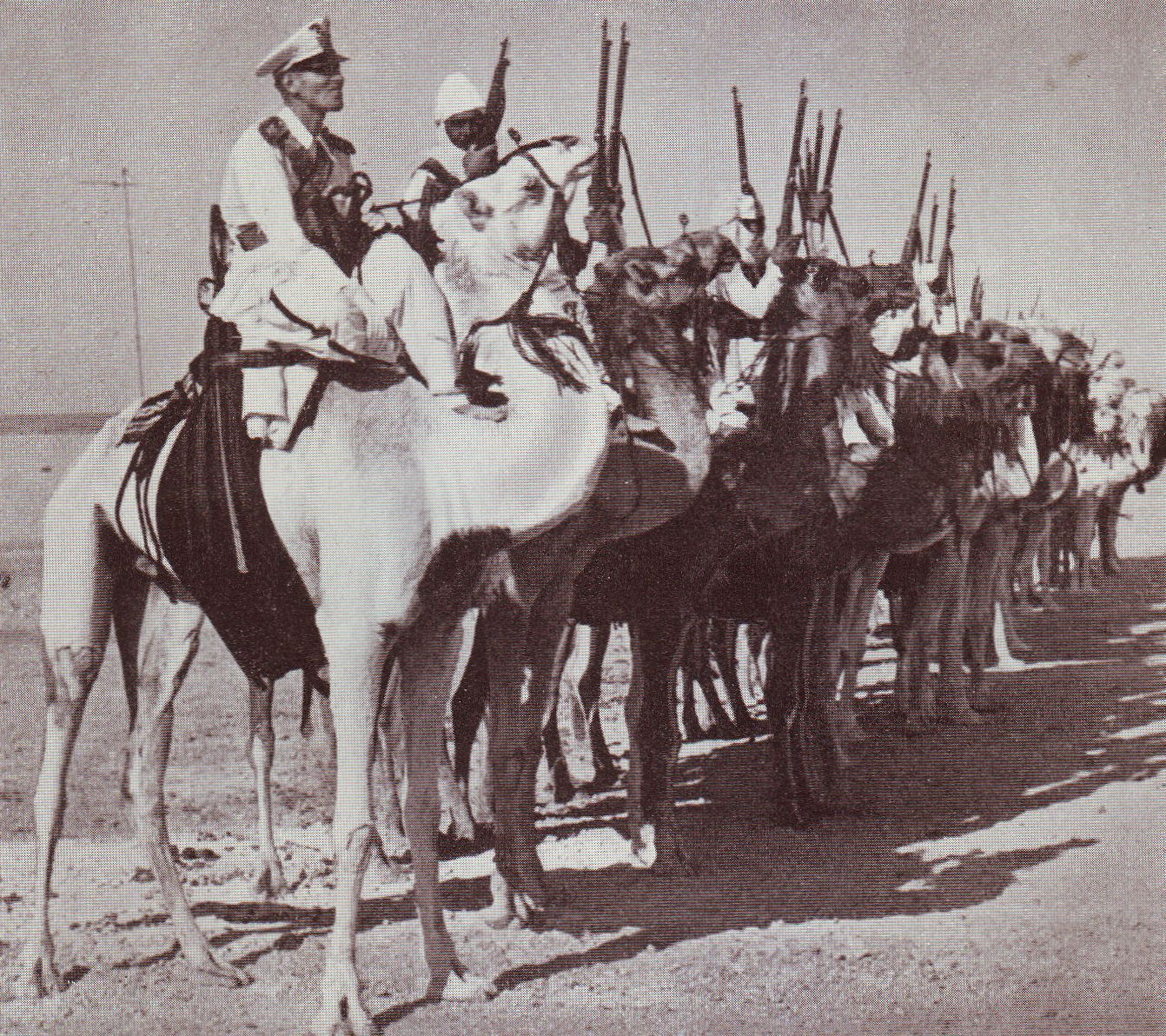
Libyan Spahis camel cavalry of the Italian Colonial Army in Ghadames, 1933

In the 1930s, the policy of Italian fascism toward Libya began to change, and both Italian Cyrenaica and Tripolitania, along with Fezzan, were merged into Italian Libya in 1934. The Italians started a new policy toward the Libyans, in order to "assimilate" them in the Italian colonial empire: they gave a special Italian citizenship to all Libyans, while improving the economy with the creation of special new villages for Muslim Libyans.

Mussolini sought to fully colonize Libya, introducing 30,000 more Italian colonists, which brought their numbers to more than 100,000. At the time of the 1939 census, the Italian population in Libya numbered 108,419 (12.37% of the total population), concentrated on the coast around the city of Tripoli (37% of the city's population) and Benghazi (31%). The 22,000 Libyan Jews were allowed to integrate in the society of the "Fourth Shore". On 9 January 1939, the coastal regions of the colony were incorporated into metropolitan Italy and thereafter considered by Italy to be an integral part of their state. By 1939, the Italians had built 400 km of new railroads and 4,000 km of new roads. During World War II a new road was still being built, the Via della Vittoria, and a new Tripoli-Benghazi railway.

In 1939 some Libyans were granted special (though limited) Italian citizenship by Royal Decree No. 70 on 9 January 1939. This citizenship was necessary for any Libyan with ambitions to rise in the military or civil organizations. The recipients were officially referred to as Moslem Italians. Libya had become "the fourth shore of Italy" (Trye 1998). The incorporation of Libya into the Italian Empire gave the Italian Army a greater ability to exploit native Libyans for military service. Native Libyans served in Italian formations from the beginning of the Italian occupation of Libya. On 1 March 1940, the 1st and 2nd Libyan Divisions were formed. These Libyan infantry divisions were organized along the lines of the binary Italian infantry division. The 5th Italian Army received the 2nd Libyan Infantry Division, which it incorporated into the 13th Corps. The Italian 10th Army received the 1st Libyan Infantry Division, which it incorporated into the reserve. The Italian Libyan infantry divisions were colonial formations ("colonial" in the sense of consisting of native troops). These formations had Italian officers commanding them, with Libyan NCOs and soldiers. These native Libyan formations were made up of people drawn from the coastal Libyan populations. The training and readiness of these divisions was on an equal footing with the regular Italian formations in North Africa. Their professionalism and 'esprit de corps' made them some of the best Italian infantry formations in North Africa. The Libyan divisions were loyal to Italy and provided a good combat record.

After the enlargement of Italian Libya with the Aouzou Strip, Fascist Italy aimed at further extension to the south. Indeed, Italian plans, in the case of a war against France and Great Britain, projected the extension of Libya as far south as Lake Chad and the establishment of a broad land bridge between Libya and Italian East Africa.

==== World War II ====
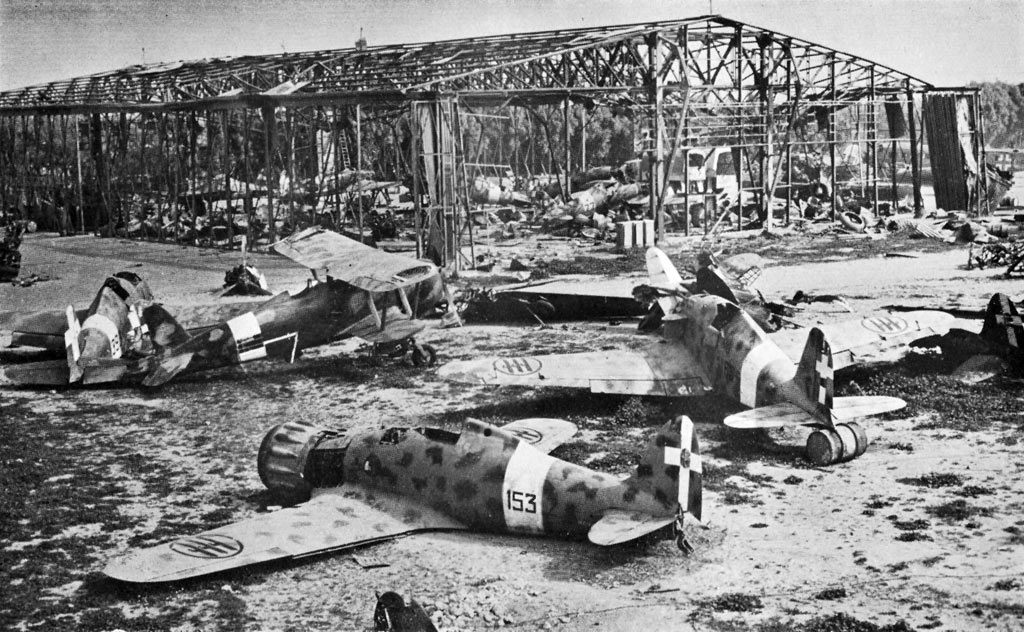
Wrecked Italian aircraft at the destroyed Castel Benito airport in Tripoli in 1943

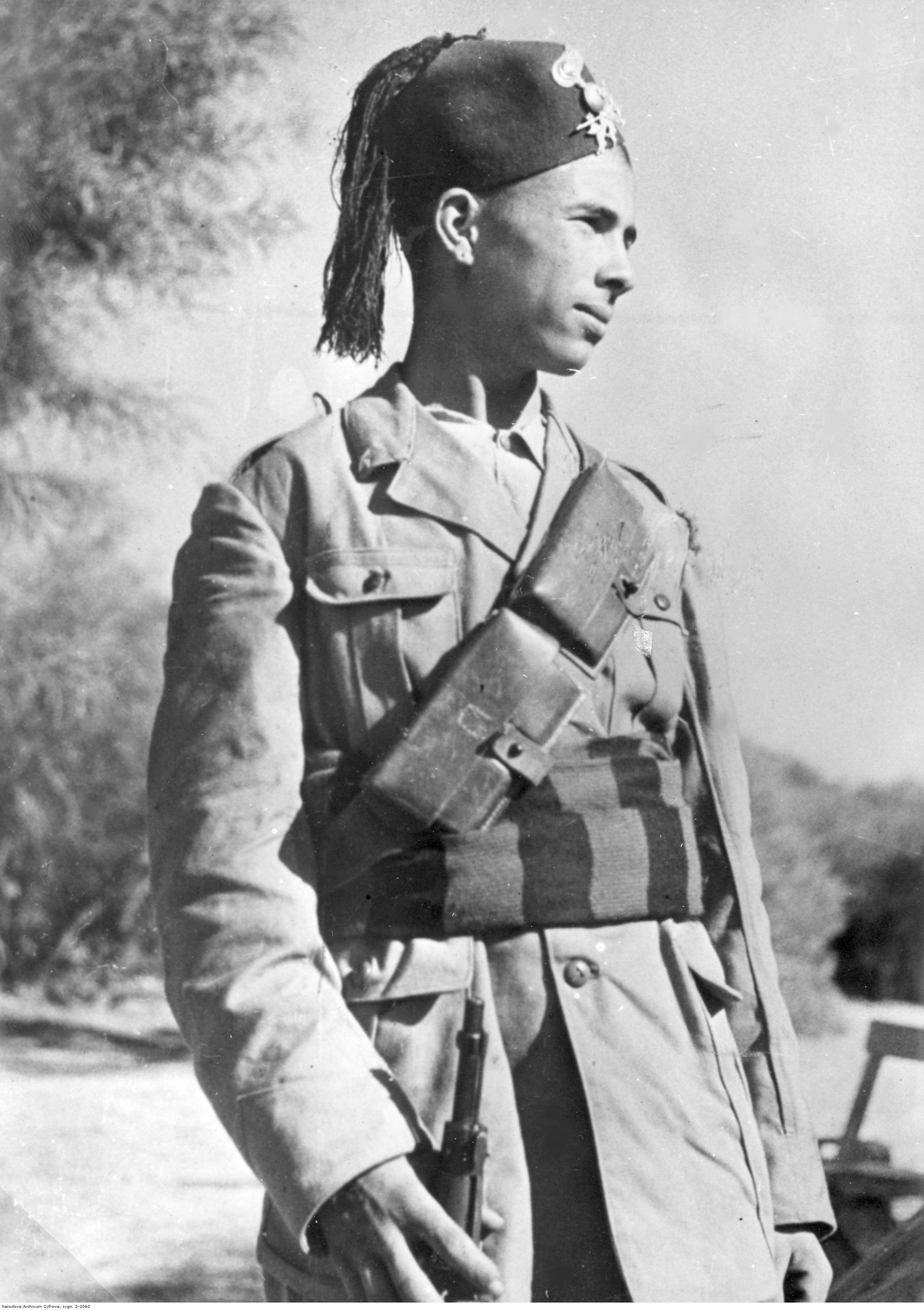
Libyan soldier of Italian Colonial Troops in January 1943

During World War II, there was strong support for Italy from many Muslim Libyans, who enrolled in the Italian Army. Other Libyan troops (the Savari [cavalry regiments] and the Spahi or mounted police) had been fighting for the Kingdom of Italy since the 1920s. A number of major battles took place in Libya during the North African Campaign of World War II. In September 1940, the Italian invasion of Egypt was launched from Libya. Starting in December of the same year, the British Eighth Army launched a counterattack called Operation Compass and the Italian forces were pushed back into Libya. After losing all of Cyrenaica and almost all of its Tenth Army, Italy asked for German assistance to aid the failing campaign.

With German support, the lost Libyan territory was regained during Operation Sonnenblume and by the conclusion of Operation Brevity, German and Italian forces were entering Egypt. The first Siege of Tobruk in April 1941 marked the first failure of Rommel's Blitzkrieg tactics. In 1942 there was the Battle of Gazala when the Axis troops finally conquered Tobruk and pushed the defeated Allied forces inside Egypt again. Defeat during the Second Battle of El Alamein in Egypt spelled doom for the Axis forces in Libya and meant the end of the Western Desert Campaign.

In February 1943, retreating German and Italian forces were forced to abandon Libya as they were pushed out of Cyrenaica and Tripolitania, thus ending Italian jurisdiction and control over Libya. The Fezzan was occupied by the Free French in 1943. At the close of World War II, the British and French collaborated with the small new resistance. France and the United Kingdom decided to make King Idris the Emir of an independent Libya in 1951. Libya would finally become independent in 1951.

=== Independence ===
From 1943 to 1951, Tripolitania and Cyrenaica were under British military administration, while the French controlled Fezzan. Under the terms of the 1947 peace treaty with the Allies, Italy relinquished all claims to Libya. There were discussions to maintain the province of Tripolitania as the last Italian colony, but these were not successful.

Although Britain and France had intended to divide the nation between their empires, on November 21, 1949, the UN General Assembly passed a resolution stating that Libya should become independent before January 1, 1952. On December 24, 1951, Libya declared its independence as the United Kingdom of Libya, a constitutional and hereditary monarchy.

== Colonial administration ==
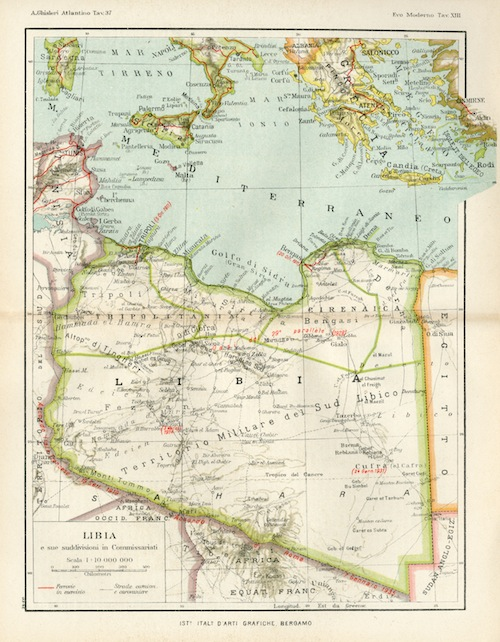
Provinces of Italian Libya in 1938

In 1934, Italy adopted the name "Libya" (used by the Greeks for all of North Africa, except Egypt) as the official name of the colony made up of the three provinces of Cyrenaica, Tripolitania and Fezzan). The colony was subdivided into four provincial governatores (Commissariato Generale Provinciale) and a southern military territory (Territorio Militare del Sud or Territorio del Sahara Libico):

- Tripoli Province, capital Tripoli.
- Benghazi Province, capital Benghazi.
- Derna Province, capital Derna.
- Misurata Province, capital Misrata.
- Southern Military Territory, capital Hun

The general provincial commissionerships were further divided into wards (circondari). On 9 January 1939, a decree law transformed the commissariats into provinces within the metropolitan territory of the Kingdom of Italy. Libya was thus formally annexed to Italy and the coastal area was nicknamed the "Fourth Shore" (Quarta Sponda). Key towns and wards of the colony became Italian municipalities (comune) governed by a podestà.

=== Governors-General of Libya ===
- Italo Balbo 1 January 1934 to 28 June 1940
- Rodolfo Graziani 1 July 1940 to 25 March 1941
- Italo Gariboldi 25 March 1941 to 19 July 1941
- Ettore Bastico 19 July 1941 to 2 February 1943
- Giovanni Messe 2 February 1943 to 13 May 1943

=== Demographics ===
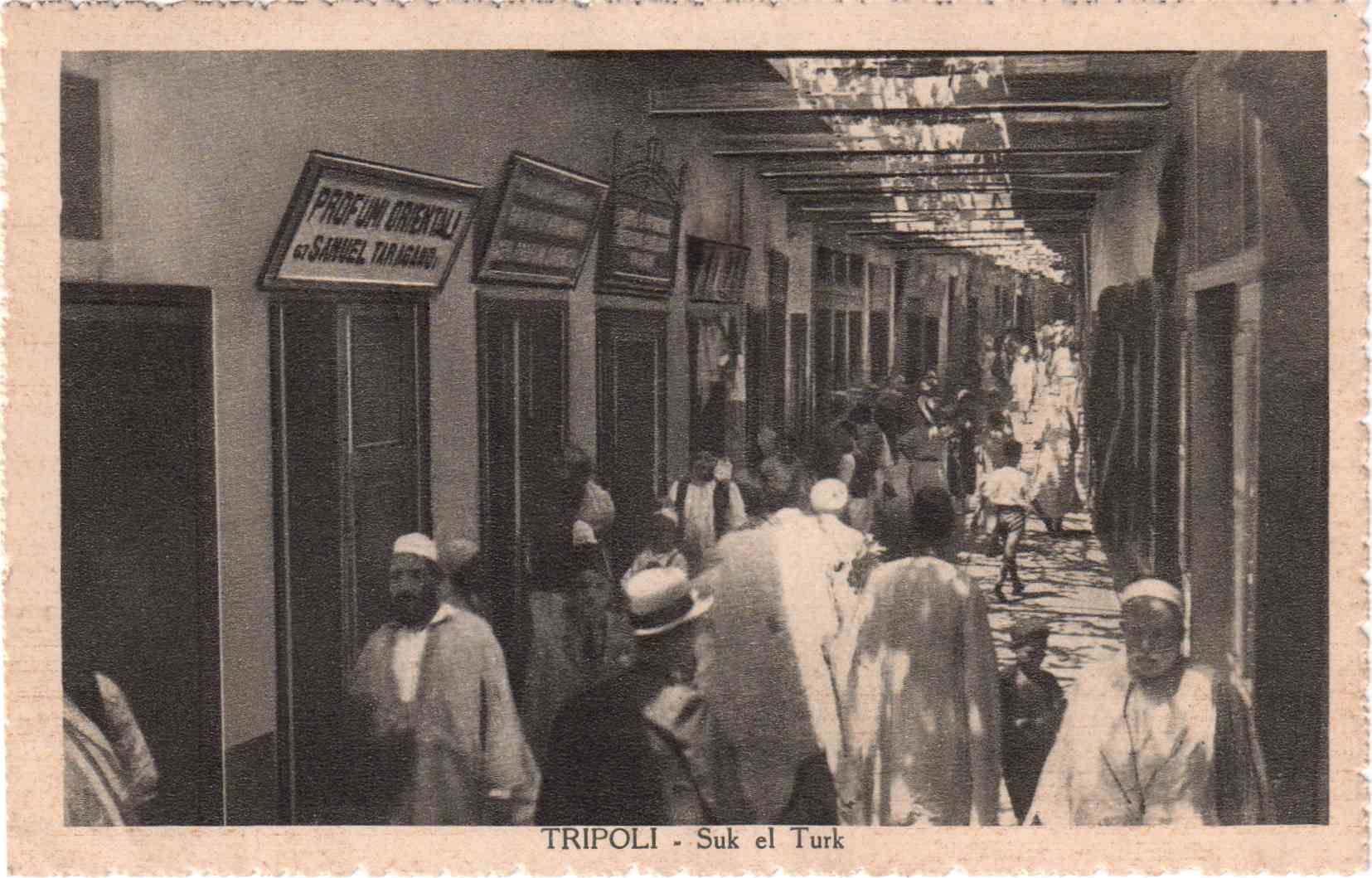
Italians and Libyans in Suk el Turk, 1935

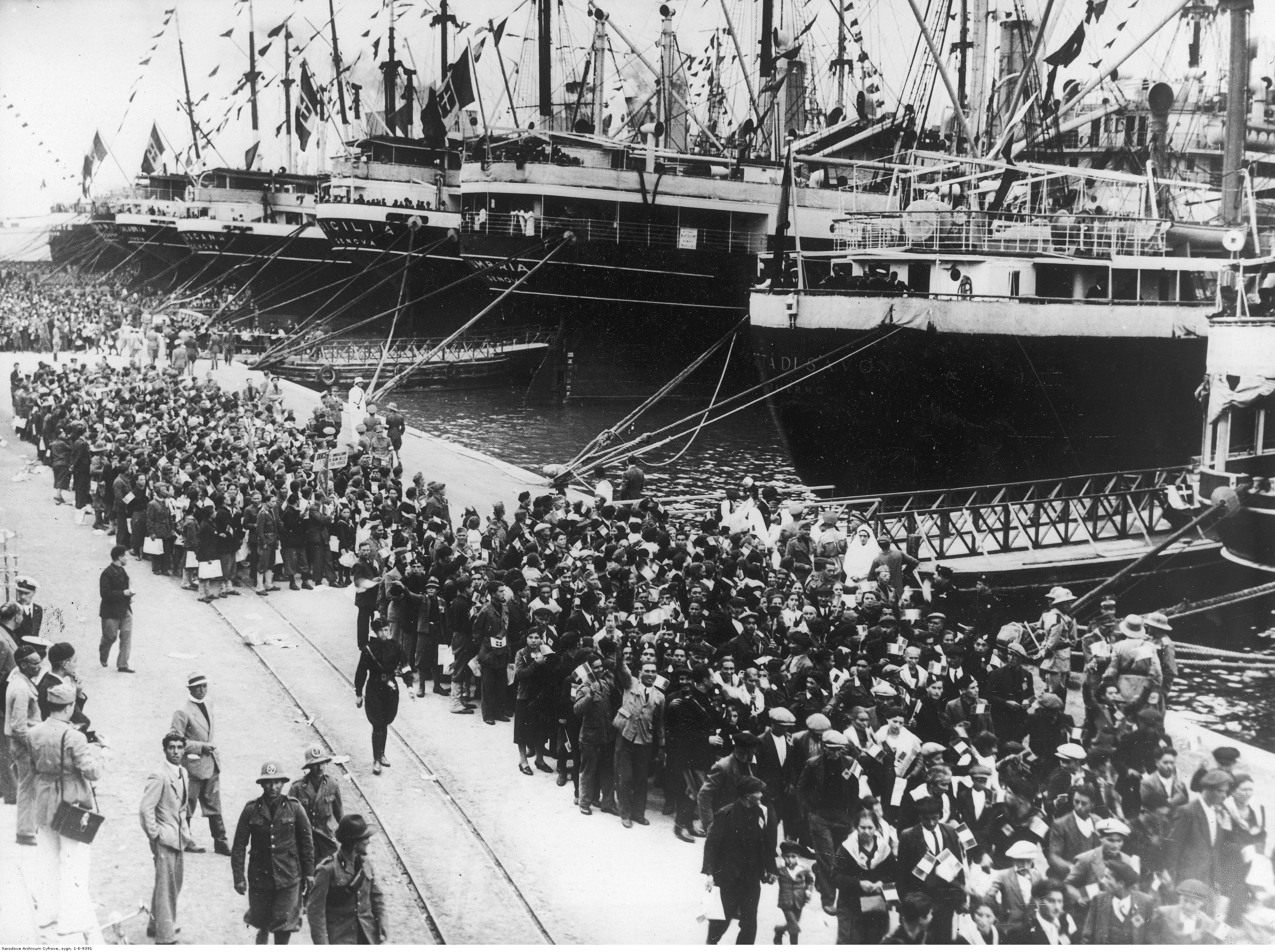
Governor Italo Balbo welcomes arriving Italian colonists in Tripoli, 1938

In 1939, key population figures for Italian Libya were as follows:

Ethnic group	Population	% of total
Arabs	744,057	83.25%
Italians	119,139	13.33%
Jews	30,578	3.42%
Total	893,774	100%

Population of the main urban centres:

Town	Arabs		Italians		Jews		Total
Town	#	%	#	%	#	%	Total
Tripoli	47,123	41.62%	47,442	41.91%	18,467	16.31%	113,212
Benghazi	40,331	60.37%	23,075	34.54%	3,395	5.08%	66,801
Misrata	44,387	94.24%	1,735	3.68%	977	2.07%	47,099
Derna	13,555	77.42%	3,562	20.34%	391	20.34%	17,508

=== Settler colonialism ===
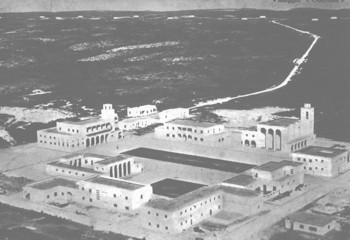
Villaggio Oberdan (now Battah) in Cyrenaica

Many Italians were encouraged to settle in Libya during the Fascist period, notably in the coastal areas. The annexation of Libya's coastal provinces in 1939 brought them to be an integral part of metropolitan Italy and the focus of Italian settlement.

The population of Italian settlers in Libya increased rapidly after the Great Depression: in 1927, there were just about 26,000, by 1931 44,600, 66,525 in 1936 and eventually, in 1939, they numbered 119,139, or 13% of the total population.

They were concentrated on the Mediterranean coast, especially in the main urban centres and in the farmlands around Tripoli, where they constituted 41.62% of the city's population, and in Benghazi 34.52%. Settlers found jobs in the construction boom fuelled by Fascist interventionist policies.

In 1938, Governor Italo Balbo brought 20,000 Italian farmers to settle in Libya, and 27 new villages were founded, mainly in Cyrenaica. Around 39,000 Italians lived on 370,000 hectares of the best agricultural land in Italy "by the end of 1940". Italians grew different crops in Tripolitania and Cyrenaica; with Tripolitania being more tree based agriculture while Cyrenacia's agriculture was more based upon cereals and ranching. Plans were in place to bring in more settlers after World War II but this never came to fruition.

=== Assimilation policies ===
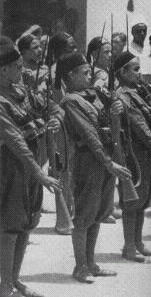
Arab Lictor Youth (GAL) members

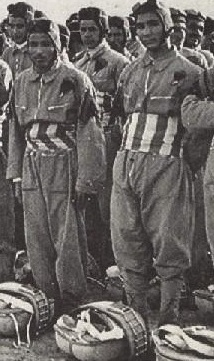
Ascari del Cielo, Libyan paratroopers of the Italian Army

After the campaign of reprisals known as the "pacification campaign", the Italian government changed policy toward the local population: in December 1934, individual freedom, inviolability of home and property, the right to join the military or civil administrations, and the right to freely pursue a career or employment were promised to the Libyans.

In a trip by Mussolini to Libya in 1937, a propaganda event was created where Mussolini met with Muslim Arab dignitaries, who gave him an honorary sword (that had actually been made in Florence) which was to symbolize Mussolini as a protector of the Muslim Arab peoples there.

In January 1939, Italy annexed territories in Libya that it considered Italy's Fourth Shore with Libya's four coastal provinces of Tripoli, Misurata, Bengazi, and Derna becoming an integral part of metropolitan Italy. At the same time indigenous Libyans were granted "Special Italian Citizenship" which required such people to be literate and confined this type of citizenship to be valid in Libya only.

In 1939, laws were passed that allowed Muslims to be permitted to join the National Fascist Party and in particular the Muslim Association of the Lictor (Associazione Musulmana del Littorio). This allowed the creation of Libyan military units within the Italian army. In March 1940, two divisions of Libyan colonial troops (for a total of 30,090 native Muslim soldiers) were created and in summer 1940 the first and second Divisions of Fanteria Libica (Libyan infantry) participated in the Italian offensive against the British Empire's Egypt: 1st Libyan Division and 2nd Libyan Division.

== Economy ==
In 1936, the main sectors of economic activity in Italian Libya (by number of employees) were industry (30.4%), public administration (29.8%), agriculture and fishing (16.7%), commerce (10.7%), transports (5.8%), domestic work (3.8%), legal profession and private teaching (1.3%), banking and insurance (1.1%).

=== Infrastructure development ===
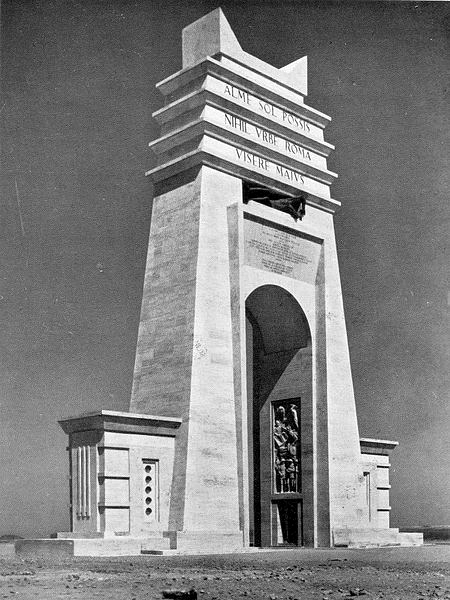
The Via Balbia at the Marble Arch in 1937

Italians greatly developed the two main cities of Libya, Tripoli and Benghazi, with new ports and airports, new hospitals and schools and many new roads & buildings.

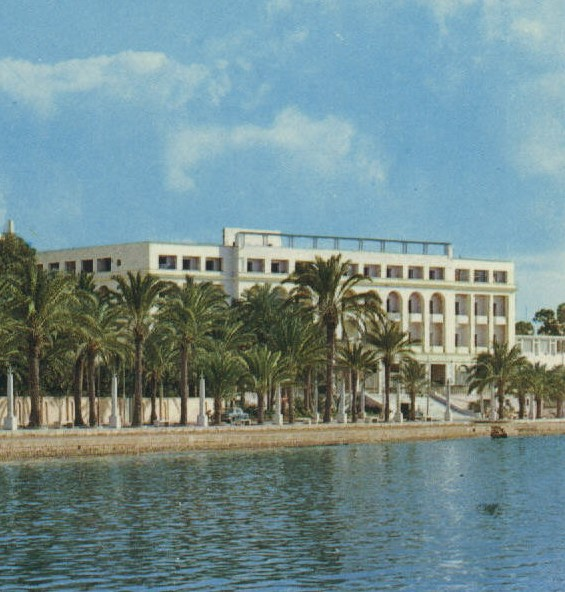
The Berenice Albergo

Also tourism was improved and a huge & modern "Grand Hotel" was built in Tripoli and in Benghazi.

The Fascist regime, especially during Depression years, emphasized infrastructure improvements and public works. In particular, Governor Italo Balbo greatly expanded Libyan railway and road networks from 1934 to 1940, building hundreds of kilometers of new roads and railways and encouraging the establishment of new industries and a dozen new agricultural villages. The massive Italian investment did little to improve Libyan quality of life, since the purpose was to develop the economy for the benefit of Italy and Italian settlers.

The Italian aim was to drive the local population to the marginal land in the interior and to resettle the Italian population in the most fertile lands of Libya. The Italians did provide the Libyans with some initial education but minimally improved native administration. The Italian population (about 10% of the total population) had 81 elementary schools in 1939–1940, while the Libyans (more than 85% of total population) had 97. There were only three secondary schools for Libyans by 1940, two in Tripoli and one in Benghazi.

The Libyan economy substantially grew in the late 1930s, mainly in the agricultural sector. Even some manufacturing activities were developed, mostly related to the food industry. Building construction increased immensely. Furthermore, the Italians made modern medical care available for the first time in Libya and improved sanitary conditions in the towns.

The Italians started numerous and diverse businesses in Tripolitania and Cyrenaica. These included an explosives factory, railway workshops, Fiat Motor works, various food processing plants, electrical engineering workshops, ironworks, water plants, agricultural machinery factories, breweries, distilleries, biscuit factories, a tobacco factory, tanneries, bakeries, lime, brick and cement works, Esparto grass industry, mechanical saw mills, and the Petrolibya Society (Trye 1998). Italian investment in her colony was to take advantage of new colonists and to make it more self-sufficient. (General Staff War Office 1939, 165/b).

By 1939, the Italians had built 400 kilometres (250 mi) of new railroads and 4,000 kilometres (2,500 mi) of new roads. The most important and largest highway project was the Via Balbia, an east–west coastal route connecting Tripoli in western Italian Tripolitania to Tobruk in eastern Italian Cyrenaica. The last railway development in Libya done by the Italians was the Tripoli-Benghazi line that was started in 1941 and was never completed because of the Italian defeat during World War II.

== Archaeology and tourism ==
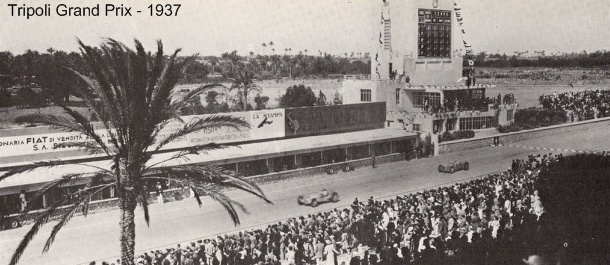
1937 Tripoli Grand Prix

Classical archaeology was used by the Italian authorities as a propaganda tool to justify their presence in the region. Before 1911, no archeological research was done in Tripolitania and Cyrenaica. By the late 1920s the Italian government had started funding excavations in the main Roman cities of Leptis Magna and Sabratha (Cyrenaica was left for later excavations because of the ongoing colonial war against Muslim rebels in that province). A result of the Fascist takeover was that all foreign archaeological expeditions were forced out of Libya, and all archeological work was consolidated under a centralised Italian excavation policy, which exclusively benefitted Italian museums and journals.

After Cyrenaica's full 'pacification', the Italian archaeological efforts in the 1930s were more focused on the former Greek colony of Cyrenaica than in Tripolitania, which was a Punic colony during the Greek period. The rejection of Phoenician research was partly because of anti-Semitic reasons (the Phoenicians were a Semitic people, distantly related to the Arabs and Jews). Of special interest were the Roman colonies of Leptis Magna and Sabratha, and the preparation of these sites for archaeological tourism.

Tourism was further promoted by the creation of the Tripoli Grand Prix, a racing car event of international importance.

== Contemporary relations ==
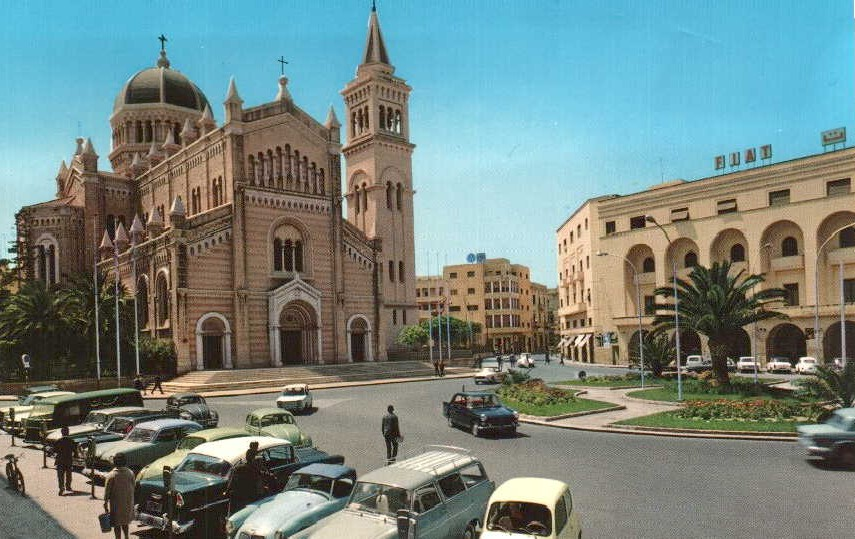
Tripoli Cathedral and the former FIAT centre (Meydan al Gaza'ir) during the 1960s.

After independence, many Italian settlers still remained in Libya; there were 35,000 Italo-Libyans in 1962. However, the Italian population virtually disappeared after the Libyan leader Muammar Gaddafi ordered the expulsion of remaining Italians (about 20,000) in 1970. This event was celebrated in Libya as a holiday named "Day of Revenge", which was first cancelled in 2004 after Italian prime minister Silvio Berlusconi apologized for Italian colonization, and later reintroduced with the new name "Day of Friendship" due to improvement in Italy–Libya relations. Only a few hundred settlers were allowed to return to Libya in the 2000s. In 2004, there were 22,530 Italians in Libya.

Italy maintained diplomatic relations with Libya and imported a significant quantity of its oil from the country. Relations between Italy and Libya warmed in the first decade of the 21st century, when they entered co-operative arrangements to deal with illegal immigration into Italy. Libya agreed to aggressively prevent migrants from sub-Saharan Africa from using the country as a transit route to Italy, in return for foreign aid and Italy's successful attempts to have the European Union lift its trade sanctions on Libya.

On 30 August 2008, Gaddafi and Italian Prime Minister Silvio Berlusconi signed a historic cooperation treaty in Benghazi. Under its terms, Italy would pay $5 billion to Libya as compensation for its former military occupation. In exchange, Libya would take measures to combat illegal immigration coming from its shores and boost investments in Italian companies. The treaty was ratified by Italy on 6 February 2009, and by Libya on 2 March, during a visit to Tripoli by Berlusconi. Cooperation ended in February 2011 as a result of the Libyan Civil War which overthrew Gaddafi. At the signing ceremony of the document, Italian Prime Minister Silvio Berlusconi recognized historic atrocities and repression committed by the state of Italy against the Libyan people during colonial rule, stating: "In this historic document, Italy apologizes for its killing, destruction and repression of the Libyan people during the period of colonial rule." and went on to say that this was a "complete and moral acknowledgement of the damage inflicted on Libya by Italy during the colonial era".

== See also ==
- List of governors-general of Italian Libya
- Italian invasion of Libya
- Italian Libya Railways
- Tripoli Grand Prix
- Frontier Wire (Libya)
- Italian Libyans
- Massacres during the Italo-Turkish War
- Aozou Strip
- Italian Libyan Colonial Division
- 1st Libyan Division Sibelle
- 2 Libyan Division Pescatori
- Savari
- Spahis

== Bibliography ==
- Inventario dell'Archivio Storico del Ministero Africa Italiana: Libia (1859–1945) (in Italian). Vol. II. Rome: Ministry of Foreign Affairs Archivio Storico Diplomatico. 1975. Archived from the original on 2017-12-12.
- Bearman, Jonathan (1986). Qadhafi's Libya. London: Zed Books. ISBN 978-0-86232-434-6.
- Chapin Metz, Helen, ed., Libya: A Country Study. Washington: GPO for the Library of Congress, 1987.
- Del Boca, Angelo. Gli italiani in Libia. Vol. 2. Milano, Mondadori, 1997.
- Saini Fasanotti, Federica (2012). Libia 1922-1931 le operazioni militari italiane (in Italian). Rome: Stato Maggiore dell'Esercito ufficio storico.
- Sarti, Roland. The Ax Within: Italian Fascism in Action. Modern Viewpoints. New York, 1974.
- Suliaman, Aesha M. Mohammad (2017). The Impact of the Italian Occupation of Cyrenaica with Reference to Benghazi, 1911-1942 (Thesis). Bangor University.
- Smeaton Munro, Ion. Through Fascism to World Power: A History of the Revolution in Italy. Ayer Publishing. Manchester (New Hampshire), 1971. ISBN 0-8369-5912-4
- Tuccimei, Ercole. La Banca d'Italia in Africa, Foreword by Arnaldo Mauri, Collana storica della Banca d'Italia, Laterza, Bari, 1999.
- Taylor, Blaine. Fascist Eagle: Italy's Air Marshal Italo Balbo. Montana: Pictorial Histories Publishing Company, 1996. ISBN 1-57510-012-6
- Vandewalle, Dirk (2006). A History of Modern Libya. Cambridge: Cambridge University Press. ISBN 978-0521615549.
