= Italy–Libya relations =

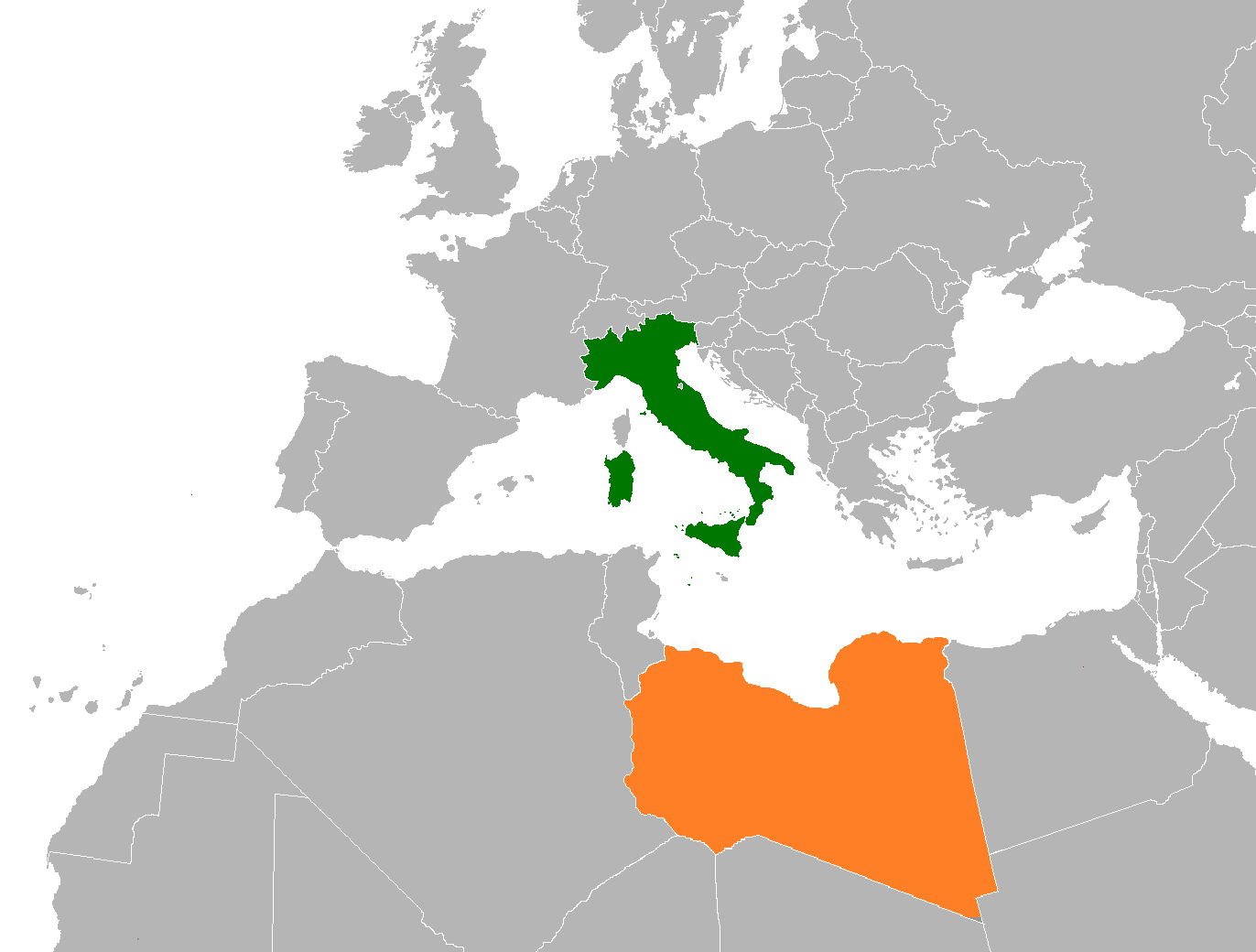

- Italy: Libya

Diplomatic mission
- Italian embassy, Tripoli: Libyan embassy, Rome

Italy–Libya relations are the bilateral relations between the State of Libya and the Italian Republic. Italy has an embassy in Tripoli and a general consulate in Benghazi. Libya has an embassy in Rome and two general consulates in Milan and Palermo.

== History ==
Between 1911 and 1947, what is now Libya was an Italian colony. The two countries established diplomatic relations in 1947.

In 1970, Libya expelled all Italians from Libya and confiscated their possessions.

While Libya was considered a pariah by much of the international community under the rule of Muammar Gaddafi, Italy maintained diplomatic relations with Libya and imported a significant quantity of its oil from the country. Relations between Italy and Libya warmed in the first decade of the 21st century, when they entered co-operative arrangements to deal with illegal immigration into Italy. Libya agreed to prevent migrants from sub-Saharan Africa from using the country as a transit route to Italy, in return for foreign aid and Italy's successful attempts to have the European Union lift its trade sanctions on Libya.

When Gaddafi faced a civil war in 2011, Italy imposed a freeze on some Libyan assets linked to him and his family, pursuant to a United Nations-sponsored regime and then bombed the country, violating Libya's No-Fly Zone. After the death of Gaddafi, Italy recognized the National Transitional Council (NTC) as the government of Libya.

On 26 September 2011, Italian energy company Eni announced it had restarted oil production in Libya for the first time since the start of the 2011 Libyan civil war. The quick return of Eni to Libyan oilfields reflected the positive relations between Rome and Tripoli under the NTC.

The Italian embassy in Tripoli is one of the few Western embassies still active in Libya during the post-civil war violence in Libya because Italy is Libya's most important trade partner.

=== Gaddafi's Revolution ===
The 1969 coup d'état that led to the Gaddafi government also contributed to the reopening of the dispute with Italy over the colonial past. The new military junta exploited Italy as an "external enemy" to reinforce internal consensus through propaganda initiatives such as the seizure of property (including social security contributions) and the expulsion of Italian-Libyans, and the institutionalization of the "Day of Revenge".

==== Compensation claim for colonial and war damage ====
The nub of political relations remains the Libyan claim for reparations for colonialism. The question has led to several discussions: if the current Libya (never independent before 1951) was internationally recognized as part of the Italian territory, the damage caused by the Italian military operations – in the 1920s and 1930s, as well as the Second World War on the North African front – was on Italian territory and not that of another State. Moreover, no European State has ever paid reparation for its colonial past. Equally, Italy could claim compensation from the current Libyan government for the damages resulting from the numerous reprisals of the Libyan rebels during the colonial period. These issues have been set aside and also countered by the need to maintain a relaxed political relationship, for different reasons: the relevance of the oil extraction operations that Eni has been carrying out in Libya since 1956, the possibility of collaborating in the fight against fundamentalism and terrorism, the search for stability in the Mediterranean.

==== Property confiscated from Italians in Libya ====
In 1970, after the advent of the Libyan revolution, the more than twenty thousand Italians residing in Libya were expelled from the country and their property was confiscated. The value of the assets lost by the expelled Italians was calculated in 1970 by the Italian government to be 200 billion lire based on real estate property value. Including bank deposits and various entrepreneurial activities, this figure exceeded 400 billion lire (equal to about 3 billion euro or dollars in 2006). Since then, there has never been an ad hoc provision providing compensation for the 1970 confiscation. Those entitled have benefited only from the aid provided by the compensation laws in favour of all Italian citizens who have lost property abroad.

The Confiscation of 1970 was justified by Gaddafi as a partial reparation for the damages resulting from colonization. For its part, the Italian government has never demanded compliance from the Libyans with the violated treaty by using the provided arbitration clause (art. 9) nor has it ever put on the table the value of those assets "returned" to the Libyan people.

In the Dini-Mountasser agreement of July 1998, which was intended to close the dispute, there is no mention of the value of the assets confiscated from Italians. As for visas to enter Libya, after the initial enthusiasm following the visit of then Prime Minister Berlusconi to Gaddafi in 2004 – in which a solution seemed to have been found – to date Italian citizens repatriated in 1970 cannot return to the country except after the age of 65, through an organized trip and with entry documents in both Italian and Arabic. The AIRL association (see external links) represents and defends the rights of returnees, it has been asking for the completion of compensation since 1972.

===== Credits of Italian companies in Libya =====
It happens that the question about credits of Italians in Libya is linked to the problem with the advent of Gaddafi and with the expropriation of assets and the expulsion of the Italians, which took place in 1970. In reality, several aspects of the story must be considered. The "credits of Italian companies in Libya" proper, date back to economic activities after 1970: the oldest to the early 1980s, the most recent to the early 2000s. The reason for Libyan insolvency for these entrepreneurs does not lie in the political will to harm the Italians but derives from disputes of an administrative or commercial nature. The variety of cases, being 105 companies, cannot be categorized. The Italian Government, in the spirit of erasing the past born from the Common statement, in 2000 asked the creditors of the various Libyan bodies to make their respective situations known to negotiate them as a block of credits. The sum of the claimed credits reached over 620 million euros and the difficult negotiation began. The Libyans asked that the Italian side calculate the indisputable credits within the 620 million euros; having obtained the answer, they asked to recalculate it with their experts, arriving at totally different conclusions; at Italy's urging, they produced in 2004 a lump-sum refund proposal, naturally lower than 600 million. Purged to creditors, the proposal was refused, and it went back to square one. At a certain point, the Libyans said (confirming a concept already expressed previously) that the creditors could come forward anyway uti singuli, then denying this possibility when the first concrete case occurred.

==== The diplomatic-military crisis of 1986 ====
In the 1980s, Gaddafi, for anti-Israeli and anti-American purposes, came to support terrorist groups such as the Irish IRA and the Palestinian Black September, and was also accused of having organized attacks in Sicily, Scotland and France. Having become a major enemy of the United States of America, he was progressively marginalized by NATO. Furthermore, on 15 April 1986, Gaddafi was attacked militarily at the behest of US President Ronald Reagan: the bombing fatally wounded Gaddafi's adopted daughter, but left the colonel unharmed. He had been warned of the bombing by Bettino Craxi, the Prime Minister of Italy.

At the time of the American bombing of Tripoli, (which took place on 14 April 1986), the Italian Prime Minister Craxi was deemed excessively prudent and was therefore criticized by the national press for not reacting to the Libyan reprisal (the launch of missiles on Lampedusa). Over twenty years later, a very different description of the facts emerged according to which Craxi warned Gaddafi in advance of the imminent US attack on Tripoli, thus allowing him to save himself.

This is a reconstruction in accordance with the well-known positions of the Italian government, which considered the American retaliation as an improper act which should not have involved Italian soil as the starting point of the attack. This version is also consistent with some reconstructions of the missiles on Lampedusa, notably the one according to which the missiles were an expedient to cover up "the Italian friend" in the eyes of the Americans: this is demonstrated by the poor offensive penetration capacity of the missiles, which would have fallen into the sea without causing any damage. However, this thesis does not explain how Craxi knew about the attack two days earlier, given that it was conducted by ships of the 6th fleet at anchor in the Gulf of Sirte and that at the time it was said that the Italian government – and no other NATO governments, with the exception of the government of Britain – had not been involved in its preparation. On this point, however, a direct testimony has recently come from Craxi's diplomatic adviser at Palazzo Chigi, Ambassador Antonio Badini, according to whom Reagan sent Vernon A. Walters to inform the Italian government of the imminent attack on Gaddafi. As Craxi did not manage to convince the Americans to desist, he decided to save the life of the Libyan leader to avoid an explosion of instability in an Islamic country facing Italy.

==== The Treaty of Benghazi (2008) ====
On 30 August 2008 Silvio Berlusconi signed a Treaty with Muhammar Gaddafi in Benghazi confessing to and apologizing for the damages suffered by the Libyan people during the period of Italian colonialism. That was the first time in history that a country had apologized and compensated (5 billion dollars plus the medical care for those who were harmed from the remnants of colonialism) for its previous colonization. In turn, Libya agreed to fight against illegal migration.

The Treaty on Friendship, Partnership and Cooperation between Italy and Libya is composed of three parts: general principles; closing with the past and ending the disputes; and partnership.

The first part begins with an official condemnation of Italy's colonization of Libya. The second part, closing with the past, contains the reparation payment of $5 billion to be paid in annual installments of $250 million over a 20-year period. The third, most important part of the Treaty deals with partnership. While the countries planned to cooperate in the areas of culture, economy, science, non-proliferation and more, the foremost area of cooperation pertains to immigration. Notably, the Libyan coast was to be patrolled by mixed (Libyan and Italian) crews on boats to be provided by Italy. Additionally, Libya's land borders were to be monitored using a satellite detection system provided by both the European Union and the Italian government. The Treaty was seen to have improved bilateral relations by stabilizing the cooperation in a wider range of sectors.

The Treaty, however, raised some human right concerns about the fates of immigrants turned away as a result of this process. According to the European Court of Human Rights, or ECHR, Italy working with Libya to return migrants to Libya against their will violates their human rights. In Libya the migrants are subject to inhumane conditions, beatings, rape, and other human rights violations. Libya has not signed the 1951 refugee convention. However, it is part of the African Charter on Human and People's Rights that promotes human rights protection in the continent. On occasion of the first anniversary of the Treaty, Gaddafi visited Italy for the first time in his 40-year rule.

==== Gaddafi's official visits to Italy ====
On 10 June 2009 Gaddafi went to Italy for the first time on a state visit, where he stayed for three days, albeit amid many controversy and disputes. The Libyan leader was received at the Capitolium, in La Sapienza (where he was challenged by the students of the Onda Anomala mobilization), at the headquarters of Confindustria and met the highest Italian offices. During the state visit he showed, pinned on his military uniform, a photo of the hero of the anti-Italian Libyan resistance Omar al-Mukhtar, arousing interest and some perplexity. After being captured by the Italian Army, al-Muktar was publicly hanged in 1931. The day before Gaddafi's arrival, Sky Italy broadcast the film "Lion of the Desert" that depicted al-Muktar's resistance and Italian War crimes in Libya. The film, funded by Gaddafi's government, has been censured by Italian authorities since 1982 because, according to the prime minister Giulio Andreotti, it was "damaging the honor of the [Italian] army".

Particularly hostile to the welcome prepared for the Libyan leader by the government were the Italian Radicals, who with the deputy Matteo Mecacci and Senator Marco Perduca (both members of the Radical delegation in the PD) organized protests, in the Senate and outside. These protests meant that the seat where Colonel Gaddafi should have given his speech was moved from the Senate to the less prestigious Zuccari room in Palazzo Giustiniani. The speech made by the colonel on 11 June 2009, however, aroused bitter controversy for some of its passages:

«Regime of all Kinds: Gaddafi, who as current chairman of the Africa Union will attend a G8 summit in Italy next month with U.S. President Barack Obama, also criticized the U.S-led war in Iraq.»

«"Iraq was a fortress against terrorism, with Saddam Hussein al Qaeda could not get in, but now thanks to the United States it is an open arena, and this benefits al Qaeda," said Gaddafi in his speech to the Italian senate. He also compared the U.S. air strike on Tripoli in 1986, in which one of his daughters was killed, to an al Qaeda attack. "What difference is there between the American attack on our homes in 1986 and Bin Laden's terrorist actions?" he asked. "If Bin Laden has no state and is an outlaw, America is a state with international rules."»

On 16 November 2009 Gaddafi returned to Italy to participate in a meeting of the FAO. During his stay in Rome, he organized some debates on Islam and the Koran for hundred women who had been hired to be there. On 29 August 2010 Gaddafi began a new stay in Italy to celebrate the second anniversary of the signing of the Friendship Treaty between Italy and Libya. Despite his lack of qualification as regards the so-called "religious sciences" (ʿulūm dīniyya), even during his stay in Rome, he once again organized some "lessons" of Islam and the Koran to Italian women hired for the occasion. "Islam should become the religion of all of Europe," Gaddafi said to the women. Three of them, two Italians and one Spanish, came with the veil because they had converted to Islam. Also, in this case the presence of the Libyan leader in Italy aroused considerable controversy. In particular, Senator Marco Perduca (Party List Emma Bonino – PD) and the Italian Radicals protested for their stay in Salvo D'Acquisto Barracks. To counter Gaddafi's stay in this barracks, a flash mob was organized.

==== The Italy-Libya Memorandum of Understanding (2017) ====
Formally called "Memorandum of Understanding on cooperation in the fields of development, the fight against illegal immigration, human trafficking and fuel smuggling and on reinforcing the security of borders between the State of Libya and the Italian Republic", the Memorandum was signed on 2 February 2017 by Paolo Gentiloni, the Italian Prime Minister, and Fayez al-Serraj, the Prime Minister of the Libyan Government of National Accord. The Memorandum renews the bilateral partnership between Italy and Libya on migration that was previously regulated by the Treaty on Friendship, Partnership and Collaboration. The main purpose of the Memorandum is to promote bilateral cooperation on border control across the Central Mediterranean route. This route is the last part of the journey for Sub-Saharan migrants that from Niger pass through Libya and from Libya to Italian coasts. According to the Memorandum, the parts are willing to support development projects in Libya and to train the Libyan personnel that works in reception centres.

The outsourcing of migration control has been problematized. The Commissioner for Human Rights highlighted that preventing departures and returning migrants to Libya has increased human rights violations. In spite of this, the Memorandum was automatically renewed in 2020 for a three-year period.

== Economic relations between Italy and Libya ==
=== A general overview ===
The economic relations between Italy and Libya are relevant and important for both countries. Until the revolution of 2011 (the First Libyan Civil War ), Libya was the fifth word supplier of Italy, while Italy was the first exporting country in Libya. Moreover, Italy was the third European investor in Libya, if oil investments are excluded, and was the fifth investor in Libya at international level.

According to the Italian Ministry of Foreign Affairs (Italian: Ministero degli Affari Esteri e della Cooperazione internazionale or MAECI ), between 2017 and 2020 the Italian market was the first destination of Libya's export. In 2017, Italy was the first supplier of Libya, that is to say that the majority of Libyan imports came from Italy. Subsequently, since 2018 Italy has become the fourth supplier of Libya. Between 2017 and 2020, the Libyan market passed from being the 58th destination of Italy's exports to being the 57th. Moreover, in 2017 Libya was the 30th supplier of Italy, in 2018 and 2019 the situation improved, Libya was respectively the 22nd and then the 20th supplier of the Italian economy. Then Libya dropped to the 39th place in 2019.

Referring to the commercial exchange between Libya and Italy, the value of the commercial exchange has shrunk since 2012. The value of the commercial exchange between the two countries was (values are expressed in millions of euro): 15.273 in 2012; 10.942 in 2013; 6.759 in 2014; 4.908 in 2015; 2.882 in 2016; 3.875 in 2017; 5.397 in 2018; 5.957 in 2019.

At the end of 2019 the stock of Italian net FDI in Libya was €342 million, on the other side the stock of Libyan net FDI in Italy was €220 million.

The energy sector is crucial in the relations between Italy and Libya. The Italian company Eni (Ente Nazionale Idrocarburi) has been operating in Libya since 1959, and has had a privileged relationship with Libyan institutions. This has allowed ENI to continue to operate under the new regime that emerged after the Libyan revolution of 2011. Libya is the fifth Italian supplier of energy products, in particular Libya is the fourth Italian supplier of natural gas and crude oil and it is the 10th supplier of refined petroleum products. However, the trade of non-energy products is important too, in this field a major role is played by Italy. In 2018 Italy was the first EU country in exportations of non-energy products to Libya. This export is worth €573 million and the Italian exports to Libya in this field represented 20.5% of all Europeans exports (of non-energy products) to Libya.

The main products that Italy exported to Libya in 2019 are (all percentages refer to the total Italian exports to Libya): refined petroleum products (44.9%); machinery for general use (5.7%); processed fruit and vegetables (4.8%); wiring equipment (3.1%); other general purpose machinery (2.6%); engine, electric generators and transformers (2.6%). The main products that Libya exported to Italy in 2019 are (all percentages refer to the total Libyan exportations to Italy): crude oil (70.6%); natural gas (22.7%); refined petroleum products (6.2%); steel products (0.4%); basic chemicals, fertilizers and nitrogen compounds, plastics and synthetic rubber (0.1%).

At the end of 2017 there were 50 Italian companies in Libya. These companies had 1888 employees for a turnover of €4.5 billion and most of them were active in infrastructure, construction and oil sector.

=== Arms trade ===
Italy is among the largest arms exporters in the world, in the period 2015–2019 Italy was the 9th arms exporter at international level with 2.1% of the global share.

According to the 2019 report of the EEAS (European External Action Service), Italy didn't export any weapon or military equipment to Libya. The only products exported by the EU countries were ground vehicles and armoured or protective equipment, and they were exported by Belgium, Finland, Germany, U.K.

Since 2013, as evidenced by the trade registers of SIPRI (see external links), Italy has not exported any weapon to Libya. As reported by the SIPRI the value (expressed in millions of TIV) of the Italian export of arms to Libya, in the period 1970–2020, is 1477. The TIV (Trend Indicator Value) is based on the known unit production costs of a core set of weapons and is intended to represent the transfer of military resources rather than the financial value of the transfer. Of these 1477 (millions of TIV), 1415 refer to the period between 1976 and 1985.

==== Arms embargoes ====
Libya has been subject to some arms embargoes, this has affected the arms trade between Italy and Libya.

Libya was subject to a mandatory UN embargo that entered into force in March 1992 and that was lifted in September 2003. The establishing document of this embargo is UNSCR 748. Moreover, an EU embargo against Libya entered into force in January 1986, such embargo was lifted in October 2004. Ultimately, in 2011, a UN and EU arms embargoes were adopted. To implement the UN arms embargo against Libya (that entered into force in February 2011 as provided by the resolution of the Security Council: UNSCR 1970), EU member states adopted the Council Decision 2011/137/CFSP. In addition to the UN embargo on the supply of military equipment to Libya, the EU also prohibited trade with Libya in equipment which might be used for internal repression.

=== The commercial relations: energy sector ===
The Treaty of Bengasi, signed in 2008, represents a turning point for the relationship between Italy and Libya, with specific reference to the economic field. The commercial relations are based on Italian import of Libyan sources of energy and on Italian export of armaments. The first point is witnessed by investments, in fact the main sectors concerned are oil, energy and industrial plant building. In the Libyan context the central role in the energy sector is played by ENI that is present in the country for 50 years and it operates as a joint venture with the National Oil Corporation. According to Eni's data Italy owns 11 mineral securities managed by contracts of Exploration and Production Sharing Agreement (EPSA). The exploration and development activities in the country are grouped in 6 contractual areas with a Working Interest (WI) of 100% for the exploratory phase and 50% for the development phase.

The strong political instability of Libya, following the dismissal of Ghaddafi in 2011, constitutes a serious problem for Italian energy supply; the diminishing of oil quotation had weakened the bilateral exchanges in the last years, and this is linked to the fact that Italy-Libya exchanges are specialized on oil sector, indeed the 55% of Italian sales in Libya consist of oil products.

=== Italian investments in Libya ===
In Libya there is almost all the world of made in Italy construction. Anas is the leader of Italian firms have adjudicated the contest of 125,5 million euros for the service of advisor in sight of the realization of the Libyan coastal freeway named 'The Highway of the peace', that has been previewed by the agreements signed in 2008. Italian investments regard also telecommunication, indeed the Prysmian Cables & Systems of Milan signed a contract of 35 million euros for the supply and laying of broadband cables in the network of Libya General Post and Telecommunications Company. Moreover, Italy made investment in transport sector: Finmeccanica has formed with the fund Libyan Africa Investment Portfolio a joint venture for cooperation in the fields of aerospace, transport and energy.

=== Cooperation ===
The conflicts in Libya have caused much damage to the country's infrastructures and a collapse in investments, with a loss of approximately 150 billion euros. At this regard, recently, the Italian Prime Minister Mario Draghi said that "Italy defends in Libya its own international interests and cooperation"; so, Italy will help Libya to do economic reforms that would begin to face the social and economic situation strongly deteriorated. The partnership between Italy and Libya also regards the health front, in particular Italian Cooperation provided a vessel with more than 10 tons of medical equipment to face the pandemic emergency. Moreover, Italy funds activities for the improvement of migrants and refugees' life conditions in the centers managed by Libyan Authorities. Finally at the beginning of 2018 it has been launched a bilateral program named "The bridge of solidarity" that provides for the distribution of medical equipment, ambulances, school buses, fire trucks, school supplies and medicines in favor of 21 Libyan municipalities. Since 2016 Italian cooperation sustains two initiatives of United Nations' Agency for Development: 'the Stabilization Facility for Libya' and 'the Support to Transitional Justice and Reconciliation at the National and Local Levels'. The first project allows the realization of social infrastructures, the purchase and delivery of good and the rehabilitation of basic services. The second programme aims to provide an instrument for reconciliation and dialogue between conflicting communities.

== Tourism and culture ==
In Fascist Italy during the 1930s, tourism magazines represented a powerful tool of colonial propaganda. Readers constituted both tourists and a broader category of people who did not travel. For instance, the official magazines of the Italian Touring Club, "Le Vie d'Italia", reached a relatively wide public audience. Beginning in the early 1930s, an interest by the Libyan ruling class emerged for developing the tourism industry in Libya, which was important for its economic potential.

Since 1911, the colony was represented by Italian magazines through a stereotyped image based on exoticism. Bengasi was described as a city with an oriental style; also, the desert was represented as "a place untouched by time" and modernization. The cursted image was that of a sort of anti-Europe uncontaminated by mechanization and by industrial modernity. However, this representation changed in the second half of the 1930s: the description of the wild nature of the colony was substituted by the almost miraculous development of Libya's hotels and roads. Over the years, there was increasing pressure to highlight the modernity of new infrastructure and hotels because Libya was becoming a settlement colony for thousands of Italian emigrants. A process of Italianization was setting in motion, and it had repercussions on Libyan culture, which was marginalized. From 1938, articles centered on Libyan culture become rarer and rarer: on one hand, there was an evolution of public tastes; on the other hand, there was the intention to marginalize indigenous culture, particularly Arab culture, in favor of another indigenous culture, that of ancient Romans. This trend was consistent with the broader zeitgeist of fascist propaganda.

The outbreak of World War II marked the end of the tourism movement in the colony; indeed, the war imposed a sudden interruption of travel for pleasure and a drastic reduction of funds for touristic propaganda.

Libya possesses a variety of tourist attractions (natural, historical and cultural). However, international tourism to Libya suffered after the end of Italian colonial influence, not only because of military conflict but also a lack of infrastructure and concerted protection of archaeological areas.

Only in the 1990s did the Libyan government decide to diversify its national sources of income through the enhancement of its ancient historical sites and its cultural heritage, making progress in providing the necessary facilities for welcoming tourists. In 1999, the Libyan Government in cooperation with United Nations World Tourism Organisation (UNWTO) made a plan for tourism which provided for the development of the sector through the implementation of policy frameworks, strategic guidelines and objectives lasting 5 years (1999–2003). Despite the political changes, it remained valid until 2017.

In 2011, the fall of the Gaddafi government and the beginning of the civil war led to more restrictions on the tourism sector.

On 22 March 2012, the Ministry of Tourism "The General Board For Tourism and Antiquities" was created.

In 2017, Hiba Shalabi, a Libyan photographer, launched a social media campaign called #SaveTheOldCityTripoli to preserve historical heritage damaged by urban projects. She started photographing destructed buildings in the old city of Tripoli. The Italian Embassy in Tripoli supported the campaign by holding two photo exhibitions to raise awareness of cultural heritage. In Libya, five historic sites are in the List of World Heritage in Danger compiled by UNESCO.

There are several airports in Libya with direct flights from Italy: Tripoli (Libya) airport, Benghazi airport, Zintan airport, Misurata airport, Sebha Airport, Tobruk Airport, Kufrah Airport.

== Bilateral relations ==
=== Resident diplomatic missions ===
- Libya's Embassy in Italy is located in Rome, at Via Nomentana. The two general consulates are in Milan and Palermo.
- The Embassy of Italy in Libya operates in a complex of historic buildings, built between 1930 and 1956. In Benghazi there is a general consulate.

An Italo-Libyan Chamber of Commerce (in Italian and Arabic) is located in Rome, another in Tripoli.

=== State visit and Official visits ===
- July and August 1999: two Italo-Libyan meetings held in Rome and Sirte.
- 10 June 2009: Gaddafi went to Italy for the first time on a state visit.
- 16 November 2009: Gaddafi returned to Italy, in Rome for a U.N. food summit.
- 29 August 2010: Gaddafi went to Rome ahead of commemorations to mark the second anniversary of a friendship treaty.
- 23 December 2018: Italy's PM Conte in Libya.
- 6 April 2021: Visit of Draghi (first trip abroad) and Di Maio to Libya.
- 28–29 January 2023: Visit of Italy's PM Giorgia Meloni to Libya

== In popular culture ==
- Lion of the Desert, is a 1981 Libyan film about the Second Italo-Senussi War.
- Mare chiuso, is a documentary by Stefano Liberti and Andrea Segre, released in cinemas on 15 March 2012.
- L'ordine delle Cose (The Order of Things), is a film directed by Andrea Segre, with Giuseppe Battiston, Paolo Pierobon, Fabrizio Ferracane, Roberto Citran

== See also ==
- Foreign relations of Italy
- Foreign relations of Libya
- History of Libya as Italian Colony
- Italian Libyans
- Italian refugees from Libya
