= 1970 expulsion of Italians from Libya =

Expulsion of Italians from Libya

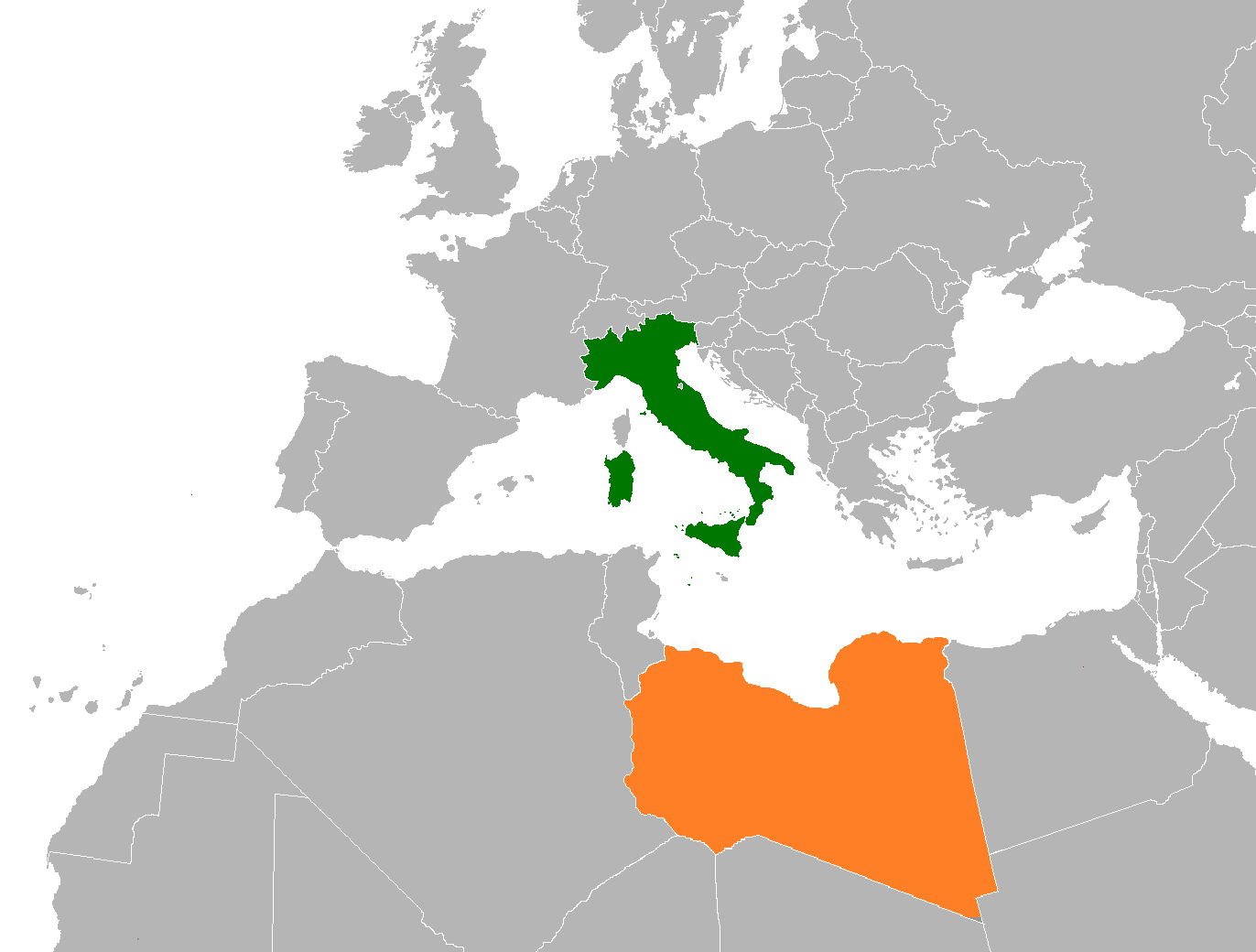
- Date: 21 July – 7 October 1970
- Location: Libya
- Motive: To "regain wealth stolen from the Libyan people by Italian oppressors"
- Perpetrator: (Libya) Libyan Arab Republic: Revolutionary Command Council
- Organized by: Muammar Gaddafi
- Outcome: 20,000 Italians expelled from Libya

The expulsion of Italians from Libya took place following 21 July 1970, when the Libyan Revolutionary Command Council (RCC) issued a special law to "regain wealth stolen from the Libyan people by Italian oppressors", as stated by Muammar Gaddafi in a speech a few days later. With this law, Italians who had long lived in Libya were required to leave the country by October 1970.

== Background ==
On 1 September 1969, while King Idris of Libya was in Turkey for medical treatment, he was deposed in a coup d'état by a group of Libyan army officers under the leadership of Captain (later Colonel) Muammar Gaddafi. The Kingdom of Libya was abolished and the Libyan Arab Republic proclaimed. The coup pre-empted Idris's abdication and the succession of his heir, Crown Prince Hasan as-Senussi, the following day.

Over the next few months, Libyan policy towards foreigners changed drastically. The revolutionary council approved a new constitution, which described Libya as Arab, free, and democratic. In the name of Arab nationalism the new government nationalized most oil holdings, seized Italian possessions.

== Expulsions of Italians ==
On 21 July 1970 the revolutionary council issued a special law to 'regain wealth stolen from the Libyan people by Italian oppressors' (as stated by Gaddafi in a speech a few days later). With this law, Italians who had long lived in Libya were required to leave the country by 7 October 1970. 7 October would be celebrated as the Day of Revenge, a Libyan national holiday. About 20,000 Italians were expelled from the country.

The coup d'état of Muammar al-Gaddafi (influenced by Gamal Abdel Nasser's Arab nationalism) was driven by the conviction that foreigners were still exploiting Libya, and Gaddafi made their eviction a hallmark of his program. By the end of 1970 all foreign holdings were seized, and nearly all Italians had left the country. Gaddafi officially abolished the celebrations in 2004, after a treaty between Libya and Italy was signed. In 2009 he invited the expelled Italians, as well as their descendants, back to Libya.

=== Italians in Libya ===
The Italian invasion of Libya dated back to 1911, as a result of Italian ambitions in North Africa. Libya was annexed to the Italian Kingdom with the Lausanne Treaty of 1923, which concluded the Italo-Turkish War of 1911–12.

For several years, few Italian nationals lived in the new colony. When the Fascist regime gained power in Italy, the colonization of Libya was increased; thousands of Italian settlers poured into the country with promises of free land and financial aid. By 1939, Italians in Libya numbered 108,419 (12.37 percent of the total population) according to census figures; plans envisioned 500,000 Italian settlers by the 1960s. The Italian population was concentrated in the coast around the cities of Tripoli (37 percent of its population) and Benghazi (31 percent). With the Italian defeat in World War II, Italian influence waned as a result.

After several years under British mandate, on 24 December 1951 Libya declared its independence as the United Kingdom of Libya (a constitutional, hereditary monarchy under King Idris). Between 1951 (the independence of Libya) and 1970, the Italian population was not granted Libyan citizenship. Although many Italians had already left the former colony, many remained as well (primarily farmers and craftsmen). King Idris was a tolerant monarch, and generally treated the Italian population well.

== Remembrance ==
The Day of Revenge (Arabic: يوم الانتقام Yūm al-Intiqāmi) was a Libyan holiday celebrating the expulsion of Italians from Libyan soil in 1970. It was cancelled in 2004 after Silvio Berlusconi apologized for Italian colonization in Libya, but reintroduced the next year. Later, it was renamed the Day of Friendship because of improvement in Italy–Libya relations.

== See also ==
- 1956–1957 exodus and expulsions from Egypt
- History of Libya under Muammar Gaddafi
- Cultural Revolution in Libya

== Bibliography ==
- Angelo Del Boca, The Italians in Libya, from Fascism to Gaddafy. Bari: Laterza, 1991.
