= Day of Revenge =

Libyan holiday currently named Friendship Day

The Day of Revenge (Arabic: يوم الانتقام Yūm al-Intiqāmi) was a Libyan holiday celebrating the expulsion of Italians from Libyan soil in 1970. Some sources also claim that the 1948–67 expulsion of Libyan Jews was also celebrated.

It was canceled in 2004 after Silvio Berlusconi apologized for Italian colonization in Libya, but reintroduced the next year. Later, it was renamed the Day of Friendship because of improvement in Italy–Libya relations.

== See also ==
- 1970 expulsion of Italians from Libya
- Jewish exodus from Libya
- History of Libya under Muammar Gaddafi
- Italian settlers in Libya
- Italian refugees from Libya
- Cultural Revolution in Libya
