= Italian refugees from Libya =

Mass deportation of Italian Libyans

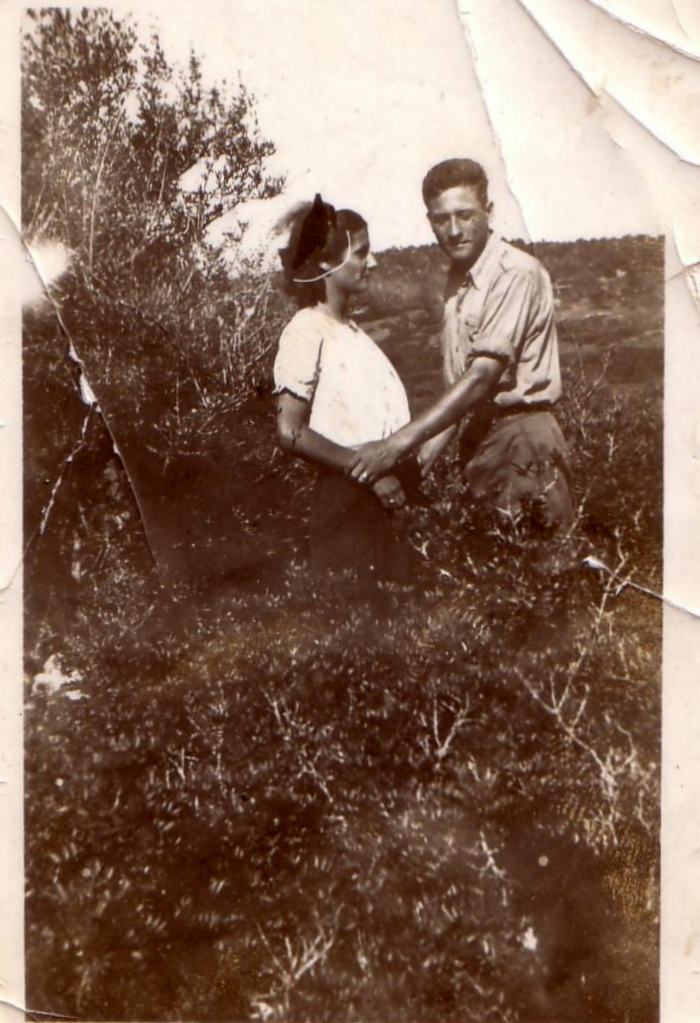
Italian colonists in 1940 Libya. Many of them become refugees after WWII

The Italian refugees from Libya were the Italian settlers and their descendants who were forced out of Libya after the end of WWII. Most took refuge in Italy, mainly after their expulsion in 1970, ordered by Muammar Gaddafi.

== History ==
=== Post World War II ===
The era of international decolonization led to an exodus of Italians from what used to be the colony of Italian Libya, especially after Libya became independent in the 1950s. Nearly half of the Italian colonists who arrived when governor Italo Balbo brought to Libya his "Ventimilli" in 1938-1939, went away in the late 1940s: this first wave of refugees moved to Italy; soon afterwards, in the early 1950s, most of them emigrated to the Americas (mainly to Canada, Venezuela, Argentina and the United States) and to western Europe (France, Benelux, etc.).

After several years under British mandate, on December 24, 1951 Libya declared its independence as the United Kingdom of Libya (a constitutional, hereditary monarchy under King Idris). In 1952 the exodus of most of the remaining Italian colonial settlers started, mainly those in areas away from the main cities.

Although in the late 1950s most of the 110,000 Italians living in 1940 Italian Libya had already left the former colony, some thousands remained (primarily farmers and craftsmen) and some even tried to participate in the political life of the new Libya. King Idris was a relatively tolerant monarch, and generally treated the Italian population well: in 1964 Libya there still were 27000 Italians, of which 24000 lived in the metropolitan area of Tripoli.

Year	Italians	Percentage	Libya inhabitants	Reference
1939	108,419	12.37%	876,563	Guida Breve d'Italia Vol. III, C.T.I. Milano, 1939
1962	35,000	2.1%	1,681,739	Enciclopedia Motta, Vol. VIII, Motta Editore. Milano, 1969
1982	1,500	0.05%	2,856,000	Atlante Geografico Universale, Fabbri Editori. Bologna, 1988
2012	624	0.01%	3,400,000	Ministero Interni-"AIRE". Roma, 2013

=== 1970 ===
But after 1970 the Italian population almost disappeared when Colonel Muammar Gaddafi ordered the expulsion of all Italians colonists, settlers and Jews from Libya. Already in 1967, as a consequence of the Six-Day War, through an airlift and the aid of several ships, the Italian Navy helped evacuate more than 6,000 Libyan Jews to Rome in one month. These Jewish evacuees were forced to leave their homes, their businesses and most of their possessions behind: of these 6,000, about 4,000 soon emigrated to Israel or the United States, while the ones who remained stayed in Rome, because they all spoke Italian and had been fully integrated with the Italian way of life since 1911. Out of the approximately 15,000 Roman Jews, around 4,000 are of Libyan descent, and constitute an influential part of the community.

Indeed in 1970, after the advent of the Libyan revolution, more than twenty thousand Italian colonists settlers in Libya were suddenly expelled from the country and, like the Jews in 1967, suffered the confiscation of all property. This was in violation of the treaty between Italy and Libya signed in 1956: this treaty was concluded on the basis of a UN Resolution of 1950, which linked the creation of the independent Libyan monarchy to the respect the rights and interests of the minorities living in the country. Some Italians of Libya wanted to organize a "resistance" political group to protect their past hegemony.

The value of the assets lost by the Italians expelled has been calculated in 1970 by the Italian government in 200 billion lire based on real estate property value alone. Including bank deposits and various entrepreneurial activities, this figure exceeds 400 billion lire that equals about 3 billion euro or dollars of 2006.

The Confiscation of 1970 was justified by Qaddafi (then president-dictator of Libya) as partial relief for the damages resulting from colonization.

Regarding "Visas" in Libya, after the initial enthusiasm following the visit of the then Italian Prime Minister Silvio Berlusconi to Gaddafi in 2004, in which the problem seemed to be overcome, nearly nothing was done: up to 2011 Italian citizens repatriated in 1970 could not return to the country until after the age of 65, through an organized trip and with the entry documents authorized both in Italian and Arabic. Even those born in Libya were denied access, as was the case of international actress Rossana Podestà who complained to have been denied the possibility of returning to her "Italian Tripoli" birthplace after 1970.

== Current situation ==
In 2014 the Italian embassy in Tripoli was one of the few Western embassies still active in Libya during the Post-civil war violence in Libya due to the fact that Italy was the most important trade partner for Libya and that there were 624 Italians working in Italian companies in the country.

Few Italians remain in Libya. Italian refugees from Libya maintain their own organization called Associazione Italiani Rimpatriati dalla Libia (AIRL).

== Bibliography ==
- Del Boca, Angelo. The Italians in Libya, from Fascism to Gaddafy. Editoriale Laterza. Bari, 1991
- Fuller, Mia. Preservation and Self-Absorption: Italian colonization and the walled city of Tripoli, Libya in BEN GHIAT Ruth, FULLER Mia, "Italian colonialism". Palgrave Macmillan. New York, 2008
- Metz Chapin, Helen, ed. Libya: A Country Study. Washington: GPO for the Library of Congress, 1987.
- Prestipino, Giuseppe. Les origines du mouvement ouvrier en Libye (1947-1951) Annuaire de l’Afrique du Nord, XXI/82, Centre National de la recherche scientifique. Paris, 1982

== See also ==
- Italian Libya
- Italian Libyans
- Muammar Gaddafi
- Day of Revenge
