= Di Maio =

Di Maio or DiMaio is an Italian surname. Notable people with the surname include:

- Connor Dimaio (born 1996), English footballer
- John DiMaio (born 1955), American politician
- Luigi Di Maio (born 1986), Italian politician
- Mariasole Di Maio (born 2001), Italian actress
- Rob DiMaio (born 1968), Canadian ice hockey player
- Roberto Di Maio (born 1982), Italian-born Sammarinese footballer
- Vincent Di Maio (1941–2022), American pathologist
