= Italian Libyans =

Italian community in Libya

Italo-libici (Italian)
- (Italy) (Libya)
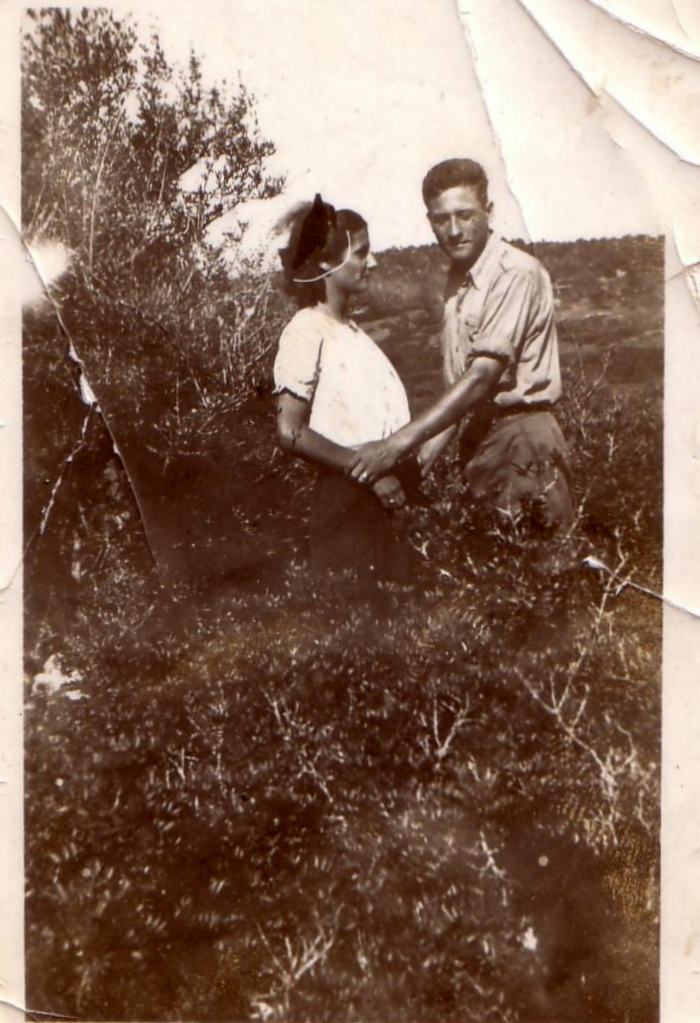
- August 1938 image showing an Italian colonist couple in Libya

Total population
- 119,139 (in 1939)

Regions with significant populations
- Tripoli, Benghazi, Khoms, Misurata

Languages
- Italian, Sicilian, other languages of Italy, Libyan Arabic

Religion
- Christianity, mostly Roman Catholicism, minority of Islam

Related ethnic groups
- Other Italians

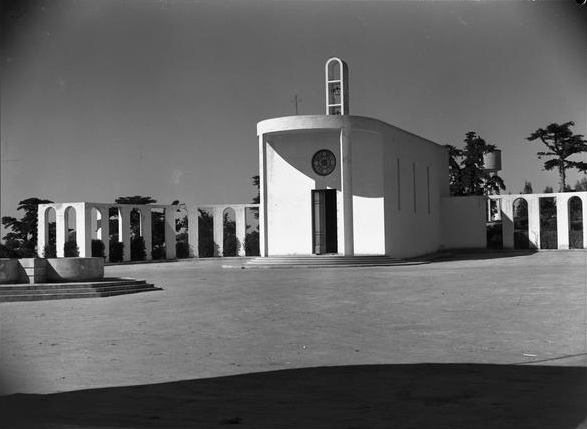
The modernist Catholic church of Massah (formerly Villaggio Luigi Razza) in 1940

Italian Libyans (Italian: Italo-libici) are Libyan-born citizens who are fully or partially of Italian descent, whose ancestors were Italians who emigrated to Libya during the Italian diaspora, or Italian-born people in Libya. Most of the Italians moved to Libya during the Italian colonial period.

The Italian population virtually disappeared after the Libyan leader Muammar Gaddafi ordered the expulsion of Italians in 1970. After the nationalization of Italian companies, only a small number of Italians remained in Libya. On 30 August 2008, Gaddafi and Italian Prime Minister Silvio Berlusconi signed a historic cooperation treaty in Benghazi. Only a few hundred Italians were allowed to return to Libya between 2000 and 2010. In 2006 the Italian embassy in Tripoli calculated that there were approximately 1,000 original Libyan Italians in Libya, most of them elderly Catholics residing in Tripoli and Benghazi.

== History ==
Italian heritage in Libya can be dated back to Ancient Rome, when the Romans controlled and colonized Libya for a period of more than five centuries prior to the fall of the Roman Empire and its takeover by Arab and Turkish civilizations. But predominantly Italian heritage in Libya refers to modern-day Italians.

In 1911, the Kingdom of Italy waged war on the Ottoman Empire and captured Libya as a colony. Italians were encouraged to move to Libya and did so from 1911 until the outbreak of World War II.

=== Developments ===
An idealized image of the take over of Ottoman Tripolitania by Italy in 1911.

In less than thirty years (1911–1940), the Italians in Libya built a significant amount of public works (roads, railways, buildings, ports, etc.) and the Libyan economy flourished. They created the Tripoli Grand Prix, an international motor racing event first held in 1925 on a racing circuit outside Tripoli (it lasted until 1940).

Italian farmers cultivated lands that had returned to native desert for many centuries, and improved Italian Libya's agriculture to international standards (even with the creation of new farm villages).

Catholicism experienced a huge growth in those years, with many new churches built for the growing Italian community: in the late 1920s the two catholic Cathedrals of Tripoli and Benghazi were built. The one in Benghazi was considered the biggest in north Africa.

The governor Italo Balbo is attributed with the creation of modern Libya in 1934, when he convinced Italian leader Benito Mussolini to unite the Italian colonies of Tripolitania, Cyrenaica and the Fezzan into one single country named "Libia" in Italian.

=== Emigrants ===
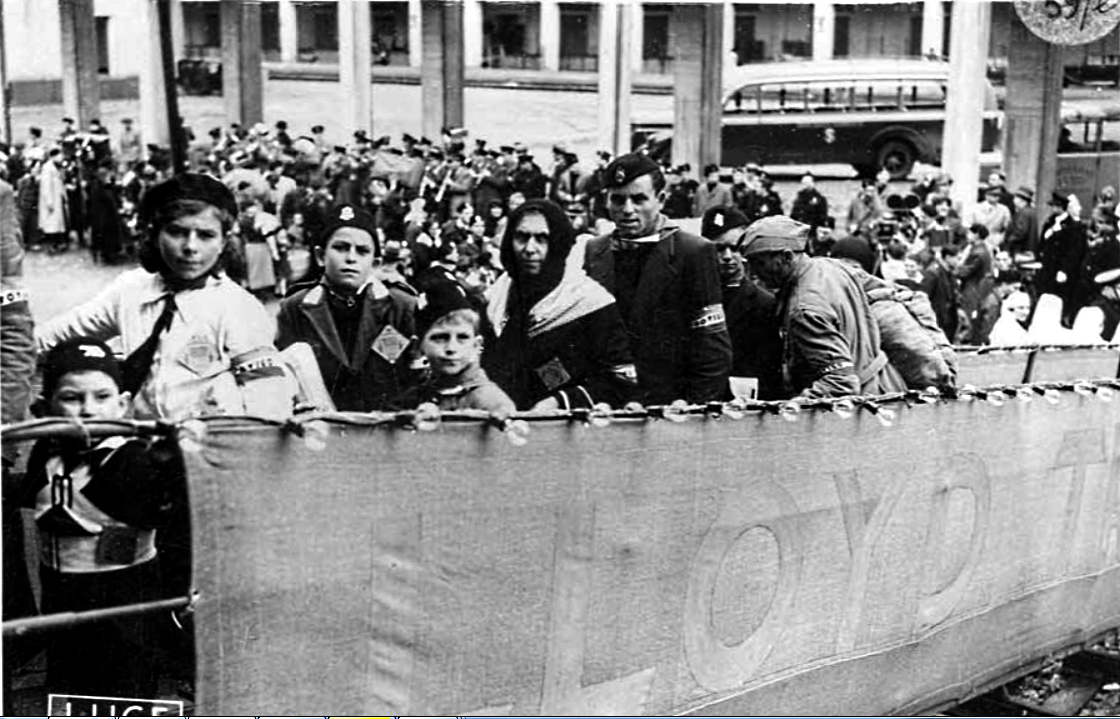
Italians leaving Genoa for Libya

Libya was considered the new "America" for the Italian emigrants in the 1930s, substituting the United States.

The Italians in Libya numbered 108,419 (12.37% of the total population) at the time of the 1939 census. They were concentrated in the coast around the city of Tripoli (they constituted 37% of the city's population) and Benghazi (31%).

In 1938, Governor Balbo brought 20,000 Italian farmers to colonize Libya, and 26 new villages were founded for them, mainly in Cyrenaica.

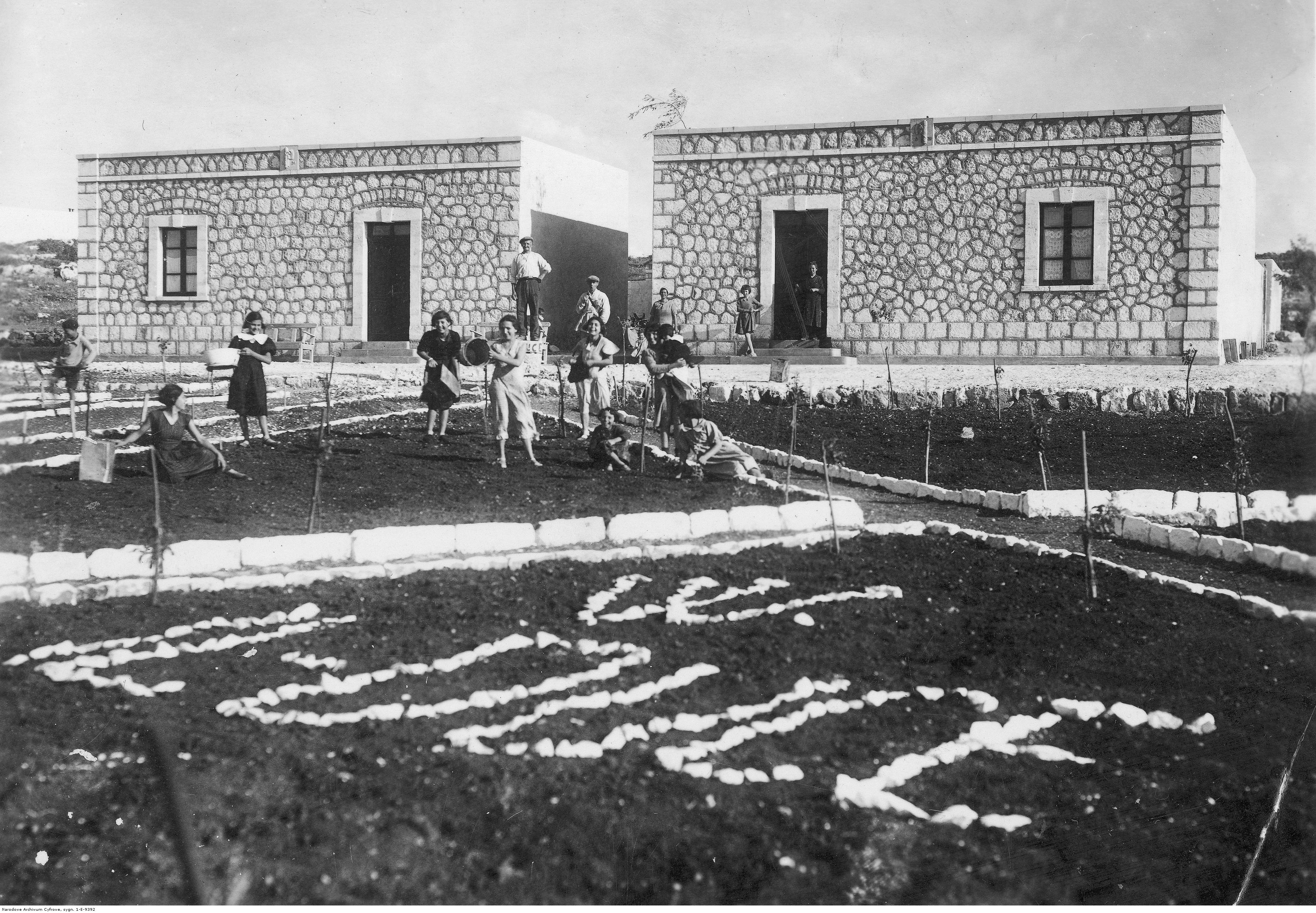
Italian colonists

In 1938 20,000 Italian colonists settled in coastal Libya. Italian authorities created 26 new agricultural villages for them: Olivetti, Bianchi, Giordani, Micca, Tazzoli, Breviglieri, Marconi, Garabulli, Crispi, Corradini, Garibaldi, Littoriano, Castel Benito, Filzi, Baracca, Maddalena, Aro, Oberdan, D’Annunzio, Razza, Mameli, Battisti, Berta, Luigi di Savoia and Gioda. For these settlements, only families with eight or more members would be accepted, with extensive medical testing and background checks to ensure suitability. The head of the household was required to be a member of the PNF. Additionally, settlers in these villages had to be from dispersed regions to prevent "regional agglomeration".

On 9 January 1939, the coastal areas of Libya were incorporated into metropolitan Italy and thereafter considered an integral part of the Italian state known as the Fourth Shore. Libya was to be part of the Imperial Italy, desired by the Italian irredentists.

By 1939 the Libyan Italians had built 400 km of new railroads and 4,000 km of new roads (the largest and most important was the one from Tripoli to Tobruk, on the coast) in Libya.

The construction of the railway Tripoli-Bengazi was blocked by the start of World War II: only a few dozen kms were built between Tripoli and Misurata.

== World War II ==
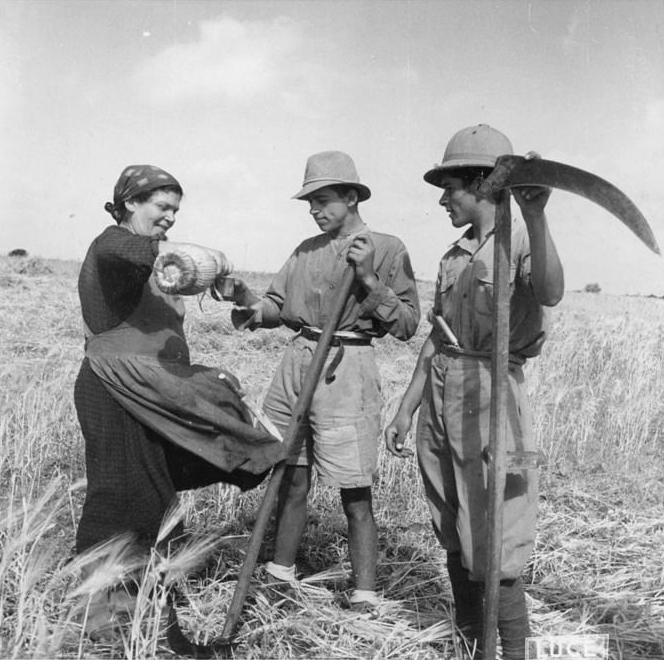
Italian soldiers with colonists in Libya, 1942.

In 1940 World War II broke out between Italy and the United Kingdom. The defeat of the Axis forces in the North African Campaigns of World War II meant Italy lost Libya to British and French control. After these Western Desert Campaign defeats in 1943, Italy was forced to abandon its colonial intentions and projects, but most of the Italian Libyans remained in Libya.

=== After World War II ===
From 1947 to 1951, Tripolitania and Cyrenaica were under British administration, while the French controlled Fezzan. Under the terms of the 1947 peace treaty with the Allies, Italy relinquished all claims to Libya. On 21 November 1949, the UN General Assembly passed a resolution stating that Libya should become independent before 1 January 1952. On 24 December 1951, Libya declared its independence as the United Kingdom of Libya, a constitutional and hereditary monarchy.

The Italian population virtually disappeared after the Libyan leader Muammar Gaddafi ordered the expulsion of remaining Italians (about 20,000) in 1970. After the nationalization of Italian companies, only a small number of Italians remained in Libya. In 1986, after the political crisis between the United States and Libya, the number of Italians decreased even further, reaching an all-time low of 1,500 people, that is, less than 0.1% of the population. In the 1990s and 2000s, with the end of the economic embargo, some colonial-era Italians (a few dozen pensioners) returned to Libya. In 2004 there were 22,530 Italians in Libya, almost the same number as in 1962, mainly skilled workers in the oil industries (principally in Eni, which has been present in Libya since 1953) arrived at the end of the nineties. Only a few hundred of them were allowed to return to Libya in the 2000s.

On 30 August 2008, Gaddafi and Italian Prime Minister Silvio Berlusconi signed a historic cooperation treaty in Benghazi. Under its terms, Italy would pay $5 billion to Libya as compensation for its former military occupation. In exchange, Libya would take measures to combat illegal immigration coming from its shores and boost investments in Italian companies. The treaty was ratified by Italy on 6 February 2009, and by Libya on 2 March, during a visit to Tripoli by Berlusconi. Co-operation ended in February 2011 as a result of the Libyan Civil War which overthrew Gaddafi. At the signing ceremony of the document, Italian Prime Minister Silvio Berlusconi recognized historic atrocities and repression committed by the state of Italy against the Libyan people during colonial rule, stating: In this historic document, Italy apologizes for its killing, destruction and repression of the Libyan people during the period of colonial rule." and went on to say that this was a "complete and moral acknowledgement of the damage inflicted on Libya by Italy during the colonial era".

== 21st century ==
Only a few hundred Italians were allowed to return to Libya between 2000 and 2010. In 2006 the Italian embassy in Tripoli calculated that there were approximately 1,000 original Libyan Italians in Libya, most of them elderly Catholics residing in Tripoli and Benghazi.

On 16 February 2006, the Italian consulate in Benghazi was closed following protests after Minister Roberto Calderoli appeared on television wearing a T-shirt depicting one of the caricatures of Muhammad. The protests resulted in the deaths of 11 Libyans and the wounding of 60 others, as well as damage to the Italian consulate.

According to official figures, in 2007 there were 598 Italians in Libya. Almost all the Italians in Libya were evacuated at the start of the first Civil War in 2011, on special flights and by ship. A few Italians returned to Libya after 2012, mainly oil technicians, humanitarian workers and diplomats, but most of these left at the start of the second Civil War in 2014.

There are also many descendants (probably 10,000, according to estimates of Italian historian Vidali) of Italians who married Arabs and/or Berbers, and Libyans of mixed Italian and Arab/Berber blood may be considered Arabs or Berbers in the Libyan census.

At present, the Libyan Italians are organized in the Associazione Italiani Rimpatriati dalla Libia. They are involved in a struggle to have their confiscated properties returned.

== Population chart ==
Year	Italians	Percentage	Total population of Libya	Source
1927	26,000			
1931	44,600			
1936	66,525	7.84%	848,600	Enciclopedia Geografica Mondiale K-Z, De Agostini,1996
1939	119,139	13.33%	893,774	
1962	35,000	2.1%	1,681,739	Enciclopedia Motta, Vol.VIII, Motta Editore, 1969
1982	1,500	0.05%	2,856,000	Atlante Geografico Universale, Fabbri Editori, 1988
2004	22,530	0.4%	5,631,585	L'Aménagement Linguistique dans le Monde

== Notable people ==
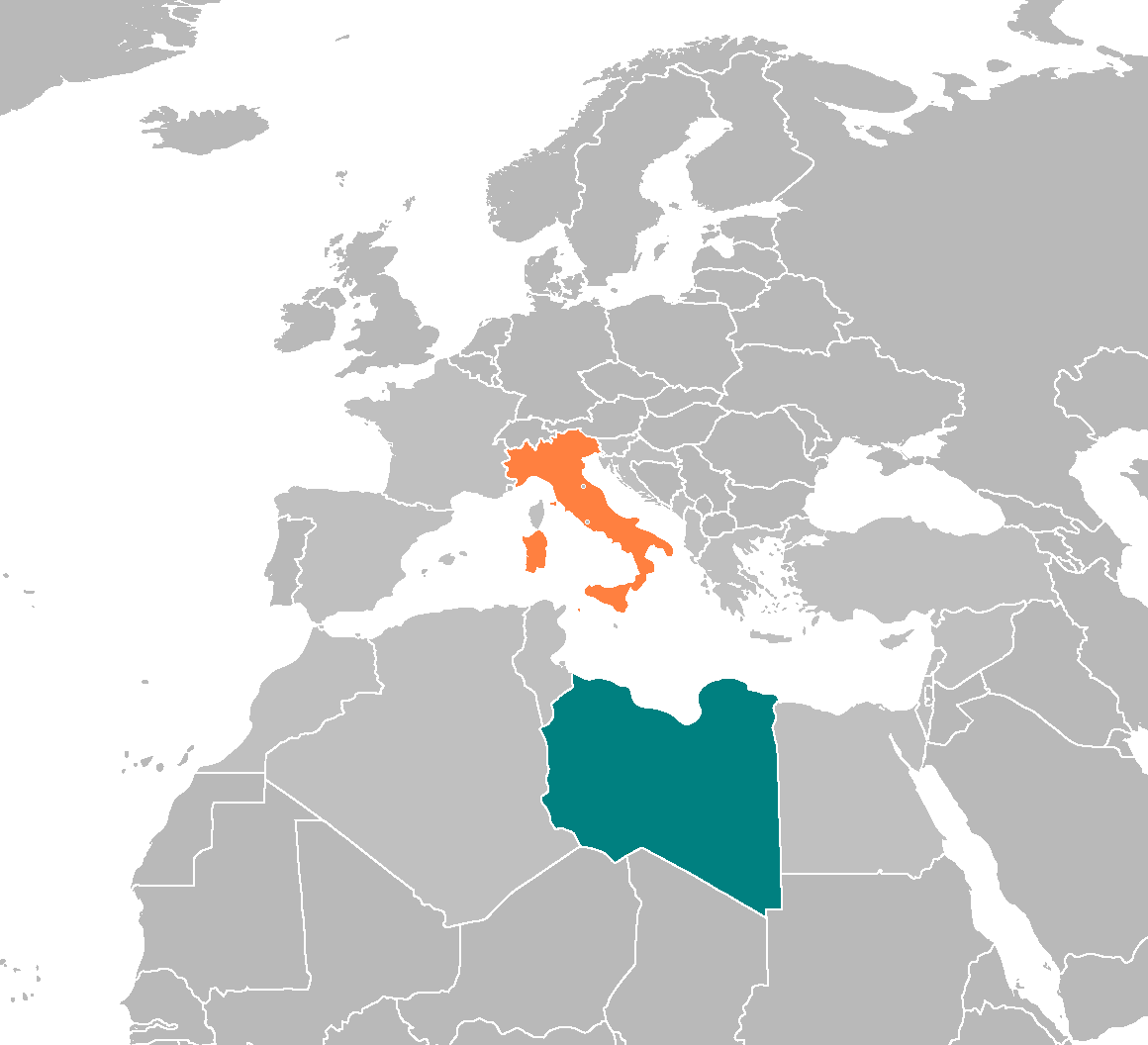
Location of Italy (orange) and Libya (teal)

Well-known Italian Libyans born in Libya (according to their place of birth)

=== Tripoli ===
- Claudio Gentile (born 1953), international football player and coach
- Rossana Podestà (1934–2013), international actress
- Franco Califano (1938–2013), singer and music composer
- Herbert Pagani (1944–1988), singer
- Adriano Visconti (1915–1945), fighter pilot and flying ace
- Robert Haggiag (1913–2009), film producer
- Valeria Rossi (born 1969), singer
- Gino Bogani (born 1942), Italian-Argentine fashion designer
- Ottavio Macaione (1925-2016), local football player

=== Benghazi ===
- Gabriele de Paolis (1924–1984), Italian Army General

=== Tarhuna ===
- Giovanni Innocenzo Martinelli (1942–2019), Libyan-Italian Roman Catholic prelate

=== Al Khums ===
- Mario Schifano (1934–1998), painter

=== Marj ===
- Lorenzo Bandini (1935–1967), motor racing driver

== See also ==
- Libyan resistance movement
- Italian Colonial Empire
- Italo-Turkish War
- Second Italo-Senussi War
- Libyan genocide
- Italian Libya
- Italian refugees from Libya
- Mare Nostrum
- Italy–Libya relations
- Pied-Noirs
- Italian Somalis
- Italians of Ethiopia
- Italian Eritreans

== Bibliography ==
- Metz, Helen Chapin, ed. (1989). Libya : a country study. Washington DC: Federal Research Division, Library of Congress. LCCN 88600480.
- Sarti, Roland. The Ax Within: Italian Fascism in Action. Modern Viewpoints. New York, 1974.
- Smeaton Munro, Ion. Through Fascism to World Power: A History of the Revolution in Italy. Ayer Publishing. Manchester (New Hampshire), 1971. ISBN 0-8369-5912-4
- Taylor, Blaine. Fascist Eagle: Italy's Air Marshal Italo Balbo. Montana: Pictorial Histories Publishing Company, 1996. ISBN 1-57510-012-6
