= Libyan genocide =

Libyan genocide may refer to:

- Libyan genocide (1929–1934), the genocide of Libyan Arabs by Italian colonial authorities
- The Holocaust in Libya, the 1938–1942 genocide of Libyan Jews by Italian colonial authorities
