= Giado concentration camp =

Italian forced labor and concentration camp for Jews in Libya

- Italian concentration camp
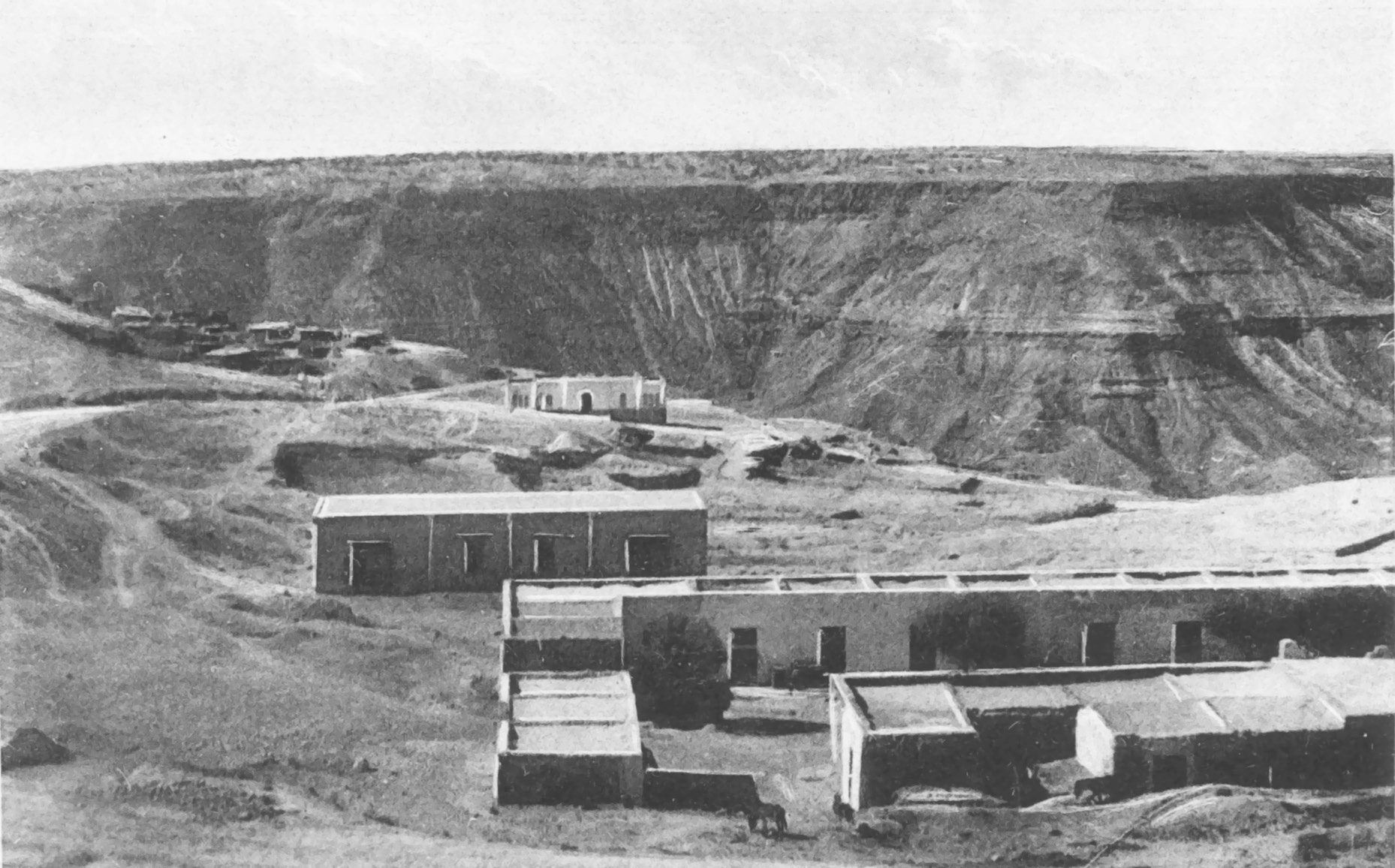
- Giado concentration camp

- Location within Libya
- Coordinates: 31°58′08″N 12°01′10″E
- Location: Giado, Libya
- Built by: Fascist Italy
- Commandant: Ettore Bastico
- Operational: May 1942 – January 1943
- Inmates: Jews
- Number of inmates: 2,600 (approximate)
- Killed: 562
- Liberated by: British Army
- Notable inmates: Frija Zoaretz

The Giado concentration camp was a forced labor concentration camp for Italian and Libyan Jews in Giado, Libya (now called Jadu), operating during the Second World War from May 1942 until its liberation by British troops in January 1943. The camp was established on the orders of Benito Mussolini, the Prime Minister of Italy. At the time, Libya was under Italian colonial control and was known as Italian Libya.

Of the approximately 2,600 Jews who were imprisoned there, 562 died, mostly from hunger and louse-borne typhus. Due to its poor conditions, Giado had the highest death toll of all the North African labor camps in World War II, and its victims make up the highest number of Jewish victims of World War II in the Muslim world.

== Background ==
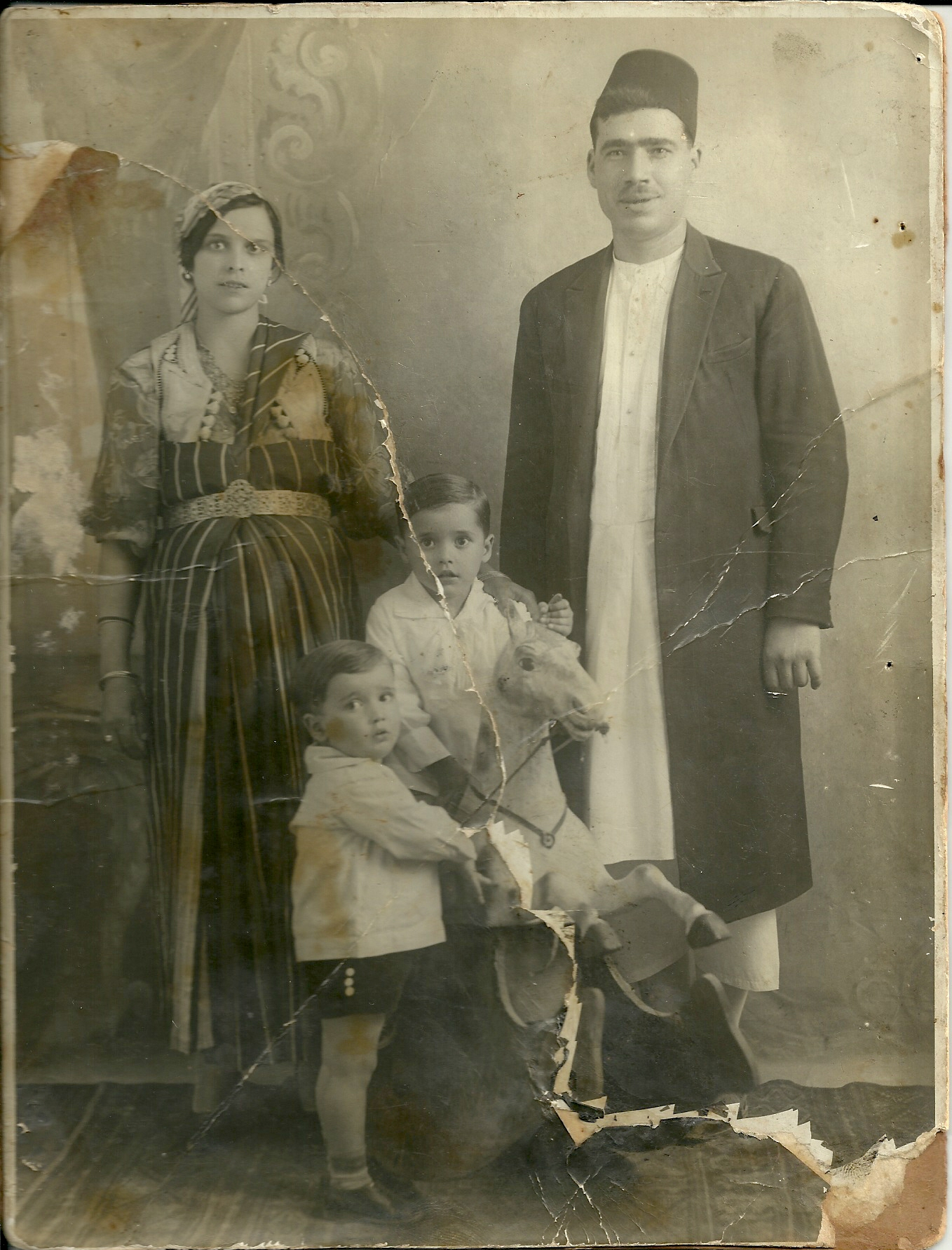
A Jewish family from Tripoli

Libya was home to a Jewish community for thousands of years. Giado, a settlement in the Nafusa Mountains, had had a cave-dwelling Jewish community since at least the tenth century, though by the second half of the sixteenth century the only remaining Jews in Libya were in the areas of Yefren and Gharyan, having fled the sites of struggle between Arabs and Berbers (both of whom persecuted Jews) for strongholds of Ottoman rule.

During the period of European rule in Libya, from 1911 to 1951, most of the Libyan Jewry lived in the northern regions of Tripolitania and Cyrenaica. In 1911, Libya was captured from the Ottoman Empire by Italy, during the Italo-Turkish War. In 1922, Benito Mussolini took power in Italy, and in 1938 his government began to promulgate racial laws that affected the Jewish communities in Italian Libya. Jews could no longer intermarry with "Aryans", hold employment with the state or in any skilled profession, or enroll their children in public or private Italian schools. In 1940, Italy entered into World War II in alliance with Nazi Germany, and the war reached Libya that year when the British entered Libya in Operation Compass. Libya was repossessed by the Axis in 1941 when German troops were dispatched at Tripoli, which at the time was 25% Jewish. The race laws began to be enforced more strictly, and Libyan Jews of foreign nationality were deported to detention or concentration camps in Tunisia, Algeria, and Italy. As Italy and Britain struggled for control of Cyrenaica, the Jews welcomed the British soldiers, some of whom were Jews from Palestine, as liberators from fascist antisemitism. Each time the Italians repossessed Libya, the Jews were punished harshly for "collaborating" with the British. Mussolini responded to the positive Jewish reception of the British by ordering for Libya's Jewish community to be dispersed or removed, in a campaign called sfollamento (lit. 'clearing').

== Deportation and internment of Jews ==
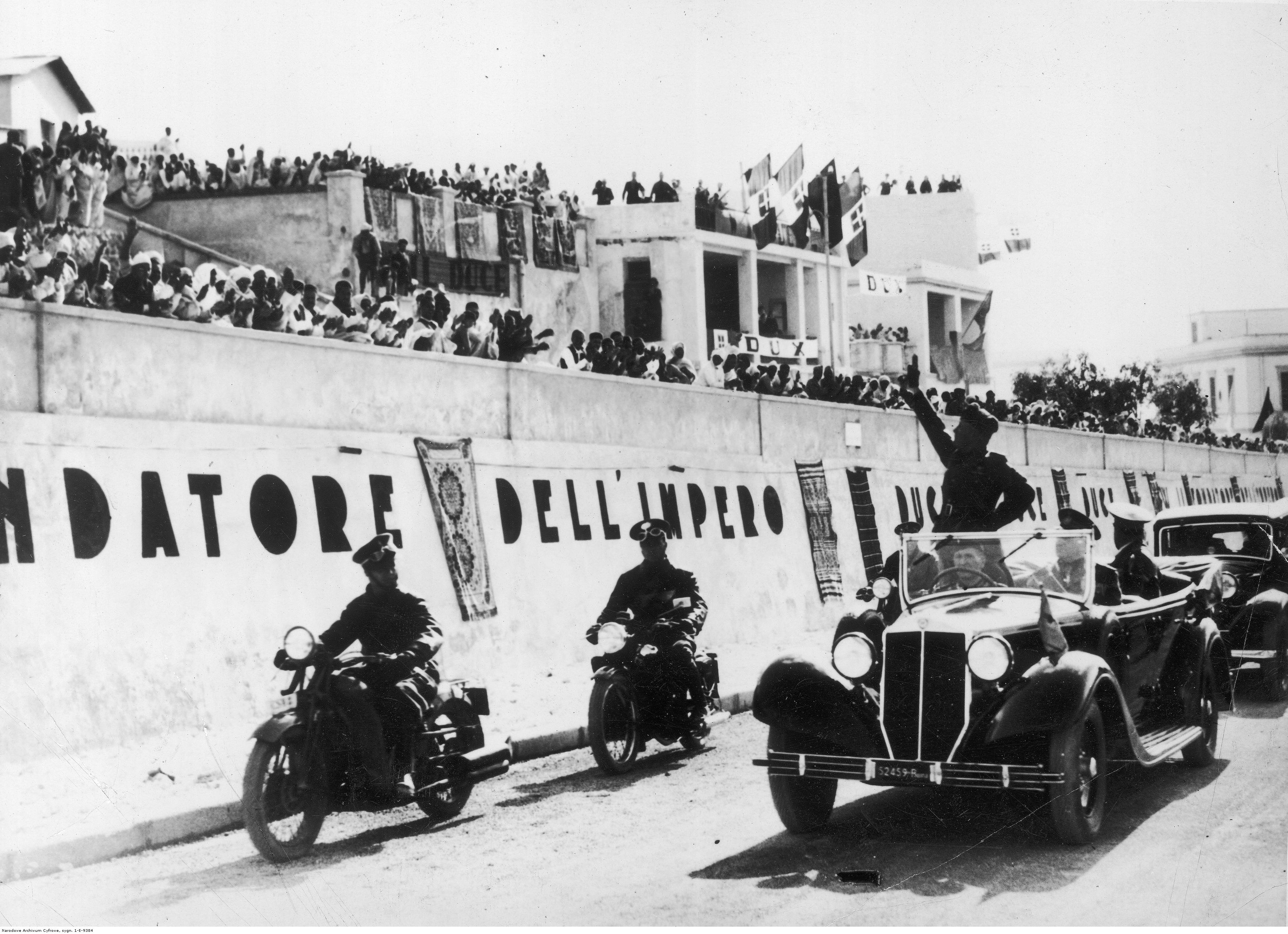
Benito Mussolini visiting Tobruk, Libya in 1937

On February 7, 1942, Mussolini ordered the internment of the Jews of Cyrenaica and Tripolitania, in order to move them from the war zone and prevent them from aligning with the British. Some Jews were convinced that the order was also retaliation for a number of Jews having left Benghazi in the wake of the retreat of British troops on April 2 and 3, 1941.

A new concentration camp was erected for the internment at Giado, a former military post in the Tripolitanian Plateau of the Nafusa Mountains, roughly 153 kilometres (95 miles) southwest of Tripoli. Most of the Jews deported on Mussolini's orders were sent to Giado, with some being sent to a camp for foreigners at Gharian. In Benghazi, the Italian authorities requested that the Jewish community prepare a daily quota of Jews to be deported to Giado. Renato Tesciuba, the official Jewish representative to the municipality, refused to prepare the list, citing "Levantine disorder" as the reason, thus delaying the deportations. The concentration of Libyan Jews in Giado was the first stage of a German plan to transfer all of Libya's Jews to Italy, and from Italy to the European extermination camps.

The first scheduled deportation to Giado was postponed. The cohort included 145 French Jews already transferred on April 15, 1942, from the Eastern city of Barce, Marj to Tripoli. The group was waiting in El Coefia to depart to the second stop on the journey, Agedabia, when the Polizia dell'Africa Italiana of Benghazi intervened and obtained the "temporary suspension" of the deportation order. The French Jews were returned to Barce, having already sold many of their belongings in preparation for their internment at Giado.

Deportations began in May 1942, and through October Jews were brought on twice-weekly convoys of 8–10 trucks from their homes in Cyrenaica to Giado following the posting of a summons in the synagogue. In June, the camp held 537 Cyrenaican Jews and 47 Italian Jews. By late July, 591 Jews of Benghazi (the last community depleted) had been sent to Giado, with the remaining 33 awaiting deportation. 380 prisoners arrived in September. A wealthy Jewish merchant named Mordechai Duani, who had preexisting connections to the Italians, provided truck transport from Derna, Benghazi, Tobruk, Barca, Ajdabiya, and Apollonia to Giado. 260 of Duani's family and wealthy friends were spared deportation. Yvonne Kozlovsky-Golan cites Duani as an example of the Italians forming "Judenrat-like networks" in North Africa.

The deported Jews were allowed to bring a small quantity of personal effects, including food, clothing, and bedding. They often smuggled valuable personal effects, including jewelry, which they could use to barter with local Arabs for food. Eric Salerno quotes a survivor who states that Jewish prisoners bought "vegetables, dates and barley" from the Arabs in exvhange for labor, such as sewing clothes. The journey across the Sirtica desert took five days, and the Jewish prisoners were made to sleep outside en route. When the deportation convoys passed through Arab villages and cities, Jews had the opportunity to trade and eat. In at least one instance, Arabs threw rotten tomatoes at Jews passing through their town on the way to Giado. An account by a prisoner named Bruria records:

In the synagogue they started hanging lists every day of 20–30 families that had to leave. The Italians came to the president of the community and asked to prepare the lists of Jews. He refused because he understood the circumstances. However, a bad Jew volunteered to prepare the lists. Each Jew had to see if his name appeared and if so he had to leave. We did not know whereto. We figured that it was not good. They took Jews from Benghazi and from the vicinity: Derna, Barce, Tobruk ... By the way, the bad Jew was not taken by the Fascists to the camp. Each day, Joseph [the husband of the witness] would go the Synagogue to view the list and I used to sit and cry. One day he said, Bruria we are going. The journey took five days; we traveled about 2,000 km from Benghazi to Giado. The trip took a few days and nights. They took us like animals to the slaughter house. 40 people in each truck and each truck two Italian policemen. They took only Jews. According to one rumor it was the Germans who gave the order.

Approximately 2,600 Jews were deported to Giado. David Meghnagi counts 2,584. The vast majority of Cyrenaican Jews were deported to Giado. Among Tripolitanian Jews, only those with British or French citizenship were sent to Giado, with the Tripolitanian Jews who held Libyan citizenship being sent to nearby labor camps like those at Buq Buq and Sidi Azaz. These deportations left only 120 Jews in Cyrenaica, who were spared "because of their good connections with the Italian authorities". Benghazi was the last community to be cleared out and deported.

Document from Guerriero Modestino, deputy commandant of the Giado camp, confirming the release of the members of the Zegdun family and Lassia Arbib from the camp and their transfer to Gharian in 1942

At least 400 Jews at Giado were sent to other sites, including in the nearby towns of Gharian, Yefren, and Triginna, to manage overcrowding. In these towns, Jews were housed in separate buildings, with one family per room, and monitored closely with no freedom of movement. Many Giado prisoners with British citizenship were ultimately sent to Bergen-Belsen concentration camp. Fear of spreading typhus contributed to the Nazis' decision not to send all eligible Giado prisoners to European camps.

== Life in the camp ==
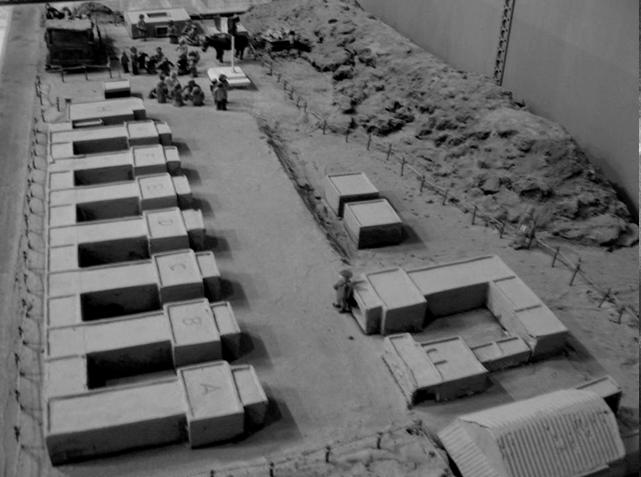
A model of the camp showing its layout

The concentration camp at Giado, set up in a former military camp originally built by Ottomans and later used by the Italians to whom they lost Libya, consisted of ten long barracks, each with a capacity of 400 inmates, surrounded by barbed wire. In each barrack was a deputy and an elected capo, a Jewish prisoner who acted as a representative and negotiator for his barrack to the camp's administration. Families hung blankets to act as partitions in the undivided quarters. Barracks had no furniture but beds, which were sometimes insufficient for the prisoners in number. A machine gunman watched from a hill opposite the camp in order to prevent escape. One of the barracks served as a jail for prisoners who were determined to have committed crimes, though prisoners accused of multiple or serious crimes were sent to a criminal prison in Tripoli.

The camp's commandant was General d'armate Ettore Bastico, the governor of Libya and the commander-in-chief of Italian troops in North Africa. His deputy was Major Guerriero Modestino, who acted as the head of camp. Bastico was known for his antisemitism and humiliating, cruel treatment of prisoners. Modestino was considered to be more sympathetic to Jews. The two regularly walked camp grounds together, Bastico wielding a whip or club and threatening inmates. Prisoners were not allowed to speak at night.

The prisoners at Giado were almost exclusively families of Libyan and Italian Jews from Cyrenaica, especially Benghazi, which contained one of the largest Jewish communities in Libya. Family units were kept together. The camp also briefly held Jews with French citizenship (who were later deported to Tunisia in 1942) and with British passports (who were later held at Ferramonti di Tarsia in Italy and at a few other Libyan camps).

=== Labor and society ===
Forced labor began on June 28, 1942. Though there was no daily work quota, men interned at the camp aged 18–45 labored in various daily assignments from morning until night: cleaning toilets, disposing of garbage, transporting sand and stone, and tiling roofs inside and outside the camp. They did not work on Saturdays. Those who fixed roofs outside the camp received a daily wage of 5 francs and one bun. Once weekly, they did the twelve-hour task of weeding and transporting dirt. The usefulness of the work was dubious to the Jews, who suspected that their assignments' main function was humiliation. As disease, malnutrition, and exhaustion increased, the work assignments decreased. It is not known whether any private firms used Jewish prisoners at Giado as forced laborers. Prisoners who oversaw the distribution of rations were spared the mandate of labor.

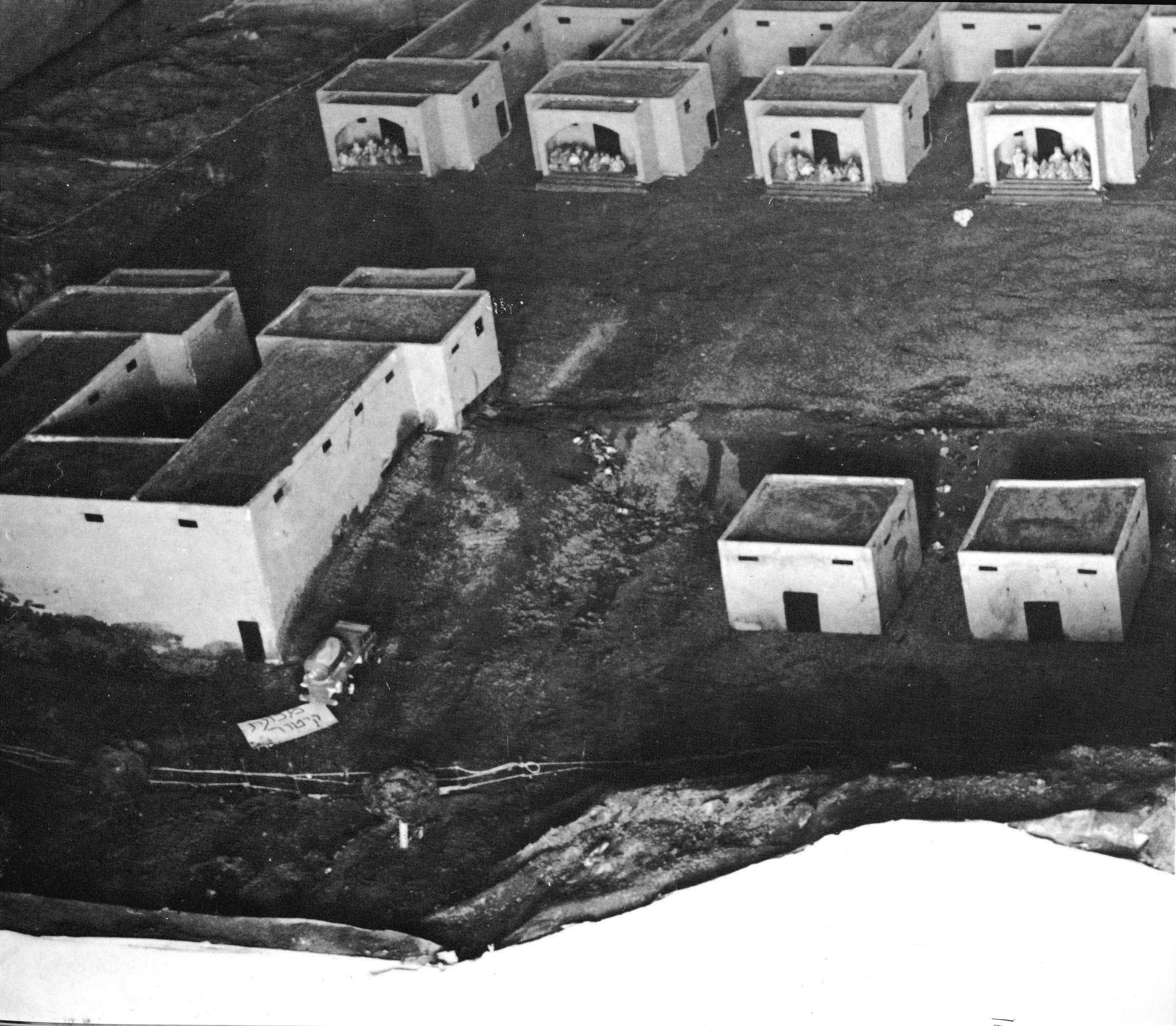
A model of the camp showing its layout

The Jewish families formed a camp council, led by Camus Suarez, consisting of an elected capo from each of the ten barracks at Giado. Each barrack also housed a deputy. Capos organized the daily life of their communities in Giado, overseeing labor and distributing goods including firewood and food, which was sometimes sent by the Jewish community in Tripoli. The capos also converted a camp barrack into a makeshift synagogue, so that the imprisoned Jews could practice their Judaism in detention. The synagogue housed a Torah scroll from Derna. A number of rabbis were among the prisoners, including Frija Zoaretz.

=== Living conditions and typhus outbreak ===
The cemetery where Giado's Jewish prisoners buried their dead

Jewish archeological remains that are more than 2,000 years old, in a cave near Giado, Nafusa Mountains, Tripolitania. This photo is part of a photography project by a student from Libya, in cooperation with the World Organization of Libyan Jews.

Roughly 2,600 prisoners were confined at Giado. By the end of June 1942, the camp housed 2,584 Jews, 47 of whom were Italian citizens. 380 Jews were shipped to the camp at a later date. This number fell dramatically due to a louse-borne typhus epidemic, which killed 562, putting the camp's mortality rate at about 21%. It had the highest death toll of any of the North African labor camps of World War II, and its dead represent the highest number of Jewish victims of World War II in any Muslim country. No prisoners were executed, and most deaths were from malnutrition and louse-borne typhus.

The conditions of Giado were extremely poor and difficult, and it is known as the harshest of the Libyan labor camps where Jews were interned in World War II. The days were extremely hot, and the nights extremely cold. The camp was overcrowded, and there was not enough food. Daily rations constituted of 100–150 grams of bread, with a small weekly provision of "rice, macaroni, oil, sugar, tea and coffee". Maurice Roumani quotes a survivor who described the ration as "no more than a few grams of rice, oil, sugar and coffee made out of barley seeds". Cold water was available for two hours a day.

Though no prisoners were shot or otherwise killed by guards, deaths by starvation were tolerated by the camp's administration. Several weeks into their internment, a delegation of prisoners requested an increase in food provisions and were answered: "We didn't come here to support you, we give you food since it's not worth wasting bullets on you." One survivor recounts that those who pleaded for more food were told: "The purpose of bringing you here is not to feed you but to starve you to death." A survivor recalls that the bread was full of bugs. Prisoners got the permission of the guards to bury their dead in the vicinity of a nearby medieval Jewish cemetery, at least as old as 1183. A local Arab had informed the Jews of the old cemetery's existence.

Survivors describe the camp guards as especially cruel, and Guerriero Modestino was known to order the confinement of individual inmates in order to have them beaten. Maurice Roumani quotes a survivor:

Tens of families were concentrated in a space of four square meters and separated by bedding and blankets. There was no place for a table or chairs and the cooking was done in the center of the room where all the smoke and the smell from the cooking penetrated the noses of all the inhabitants of the area. The poor living conditions brought infection and illness and consequently plagues that killed a good number of the people in the camp. They were buried on a valley nearby that used to be a burial place of Jews hundreds of years ago.

Poor medical care led to an epidemic typhus outbreak beginning in December 1942, accounting for most of the camp's death toll. The outbreak killed tens of people daily, and those who were sent to the makeshift quarantine room almost never survived. One survivor remembered: "I looked to one side, one died; I looked to the other side, another died." Over 500 died in three months. Initially, the sick were sent back to Tripoli, but as the outbreak worsened, the sick were concentrated in one barrack. Two Italian doctors treated the patients, with the help of 3–4 nurses. In order to prevent the spread of the louse-borne typhus, camp guards shaved the heads of detainees with lice. Anat Helman notes that, of the 22 Giado survivors she interviewed as part of her research, "only the women mention the shaving of heads and their desperate attempt to evade this fate. They do not speak about fear of the epidemic or of the deaths to which it led, but rather about their profound anxiety at the prospect of having their hair shaved off."

=== Contact between prisoners and the outside world ===
Prisoners who had brought valuables with them could barter their personal effects "at an exorbitant price" with Arab merchants—initially surreptitiously, and later allowed by the Italian guards at the fence and inside the camp. Other opportunities for trade occurred when laborers were sent out for assignments to nearby Bedouin Arab villages beyond the camp's fence. Goods traded by the Jews included diamonds, gold, and clothing—things with little to no value inside the camp. The main foods purchased from the Arabs were barley, onions, peanuts, potatoes, and poultry. The Jews also collectively bought a flour grinder from the Arabs, and baked in a pit they had dug as an oven. Those with valuables to trade held a position of importance and power in the community. One survivor recounts that the blankets were used to barter with the Arabs for ingredients to make hamin for Shabbat. Another traded a golden belt for a watermelon, and was beaten by the camp's guards for the forbidden transaction.

Jens Hoppe notes that the arrangement of trade at Giado between Arabs and Jews indicates that the Arab communities surrounding the camp were aware of the inhumane conditions in which the Jews were being kept. Arab policemen were also on the Italian-commandeered guard force, and survivors describe regular inspections and visits from Germans (presumably members of the Nazi Sicherheitspolizei or Sicherheitsdienst). One survivor, Yehuda Chachmon, recalls that the Italian guards treated the prisoners with "brutality", while the Arab guards did not "talk to", "torture", or "make trouble for" Jewish prisoners; "[t]he attitude of the Italian police was different from the attitude of the Arab police". Livia Tagliacozzo writes that the general characterization of Arab guards by Giado survivors as gentler than the Italians can be explained by the Arab guards' complicity in the life-saving trade between Jews and Arabs, even when forbidden: "An Arab guard’s simple act of turning away could be crucial to the possibility of bartering across the barbed wire." Eric Salerno quotes a survivor who names the Arab guards as Brobashi Abas and Abid Oni, whom she describes as treating Jews very well. An anonymous survivor testified in the 2005 Israeli documentary השואה הלא נודעת של יהודי צפון אפריקה (transl. The Unknown Holocaust of North African Jewry) that he was raped by a German at the camp.

One survivor recalls that Arabs living nearby were hostile, throwing stones at the prisoners. Salerno says that many of the Libyan Arabs he spoke with "insisted in describing the good, often personal relationship, with the Jews in their towns and villages."

The Jewish community of Tripoli gathered information about the camp's conditions and sent assistance, including kosher food for Passover. The community's 1943 financial report listed a subsidy of nearly 1.7 million lire for Giado prisoners. In January 1943, shortly before the camp's liberation (but when Tripoli had already been liberated), the Tripolitanian Jewish community sent three Jews to Giado with food for the prisoners, whom they had presumed had already been freed. The party's vehicle got stuck in the mud following a rainstorm, and a group of South African troops helped them get unstuck. They continued to Giado, where they found that the camp had not yet been liberated. While delivering the food, the Jewish party's driver, Benedetto Arbib, was slapped by an Italian guard.

== Near-execution ==
After the Axis defeat in the Second Battle of El Alamein, it was ordered that the Jews at Giado all be exterminated. The healthy were to be killed with machine guns, and the sick to be burned in their quarantine. The prisoners were gathered and waited for hours for the order to kill to be confirmed. The order was finally rescinded, for reasons unclear; Eric Salerno argues that the Italian officers feared prosecution as war criminals in the likely event of an Allied victory. Maurice Roumani presents the testimony of survivor Haim Gerbi about the incident:

One day – I remember that day very well, I was fourteen or fifteen—they gathered all the men together and said they had to come to the middle of the camp. I remember that day. My mom hid me ... All the Jews, all the women, the children, the women were crying ... I went to see, and I saw all the police, the Captain, both Arabs and Italians. I saw them and I ran away. I fell and hurt myself very much ... it became infected.

Gerbi's leg was later amputated.

Vivienne Roumani-Denn quotes survivor Giora Roumani, who says that a call ordering the guards to "make [the prisoners] suffer but don't kill them" came after fifteen minutes of being gathered, and the marshal in turn forced the elders to sweep the floor with their beards, "with their stomachs on the floor".

== Liberation and aftermath ==
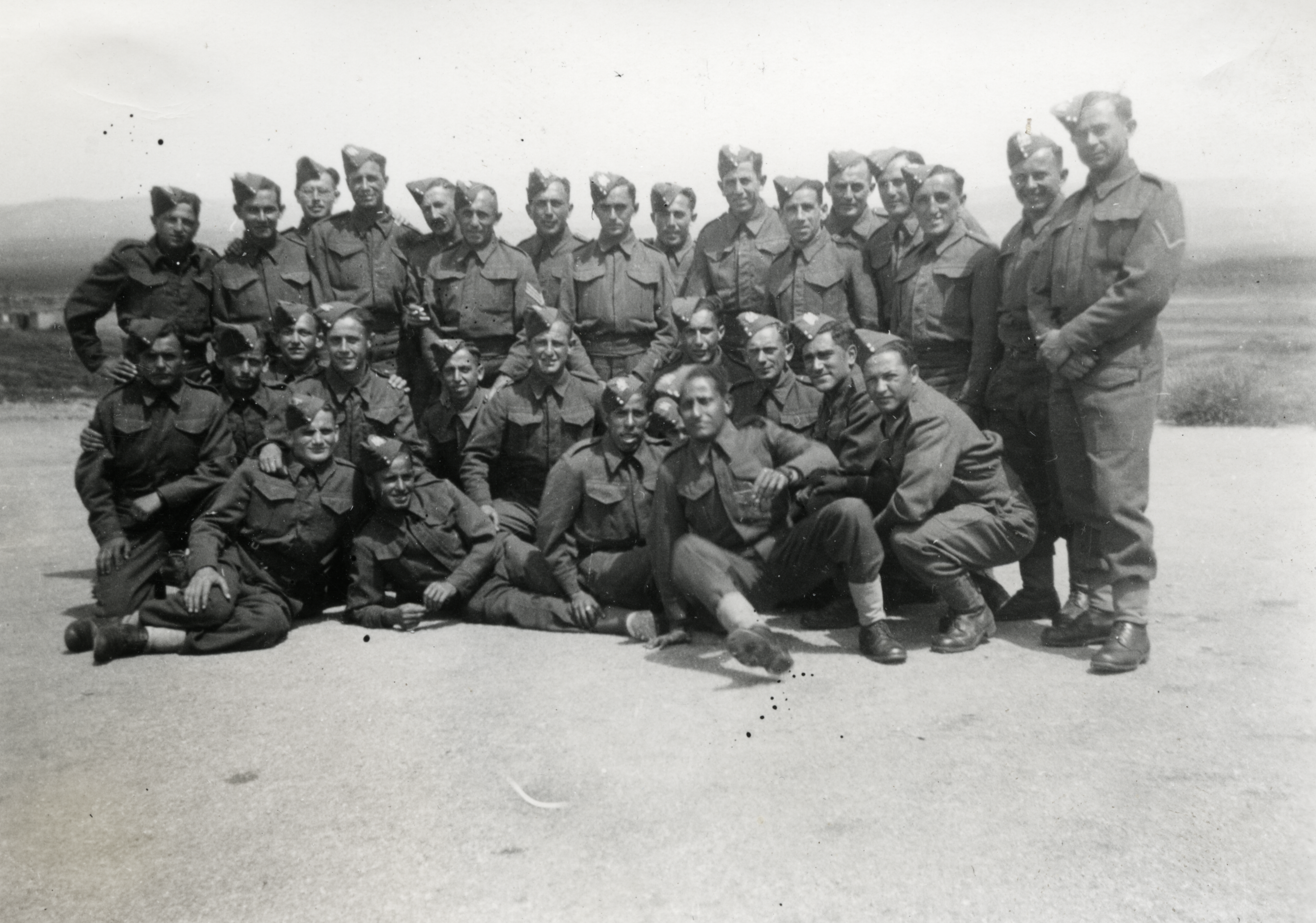
The Jewish Brigade of the British Eighth Army in Libya, c. 1943–1944

The camp was liberated by British forces led by Jewish Brigadier General Frederick Kisch on January 24, 1943, along with the smaller detention centers at Gharian and Yefren. Several weeks before the arrival of the British at the camp, some 200 Jews ripped through the fence and fled the camp, having noticed that some Italian guards had already run away. Italian troops then opened fire on the remaining prisoners. In early January, weeks before the British liberation, the Italian guards had all fled. Survivor Jean Nissim testified that an Italian in charge of the weapons depot had distributed guns to the Jews to defend themselves against local Arabs who threatened to break into the camp.

Before the Jewish prisoners could be returned home, the British first had to contain the typhus outbreak and treat the approximately 480 seriously ill prisoners. Due to the British management of the typhus outbreak, those prisoners who had fled were not initially allowed to reunite with their imprisoned families. The prisoners were brought to better housing in Tripoli, where they could bathe, be fed, and receive medical care, including from one Jewish doctor. Once this was done, they began transferring survivors back to Cyrenaica, family by family, in two-week intervals in the spring of 1943. This process was financially supported by the American Jewish Joint Distribution Committee. Many Jews still remained in March 1943, including 60 orphans who were allowed to immigrate to Palestine. The permission for the orphans was obtained from Britain by Rabbis Louis I. Rabinowitz and Ephraim E. Urbach, the two chaplains of the Jewish Brigade of the British Eighth Army in Libya. The funds for the endeavor were raised by Renato Tesciuba, the leader of Benghazi's Jewish community who had refused to prepare a deportation quota for Italian authorities in 1942. The camp was finally dissolved with the last Jews leaving at the beginning of October 1943.

=== Destruction of Libya's Jewish community ===
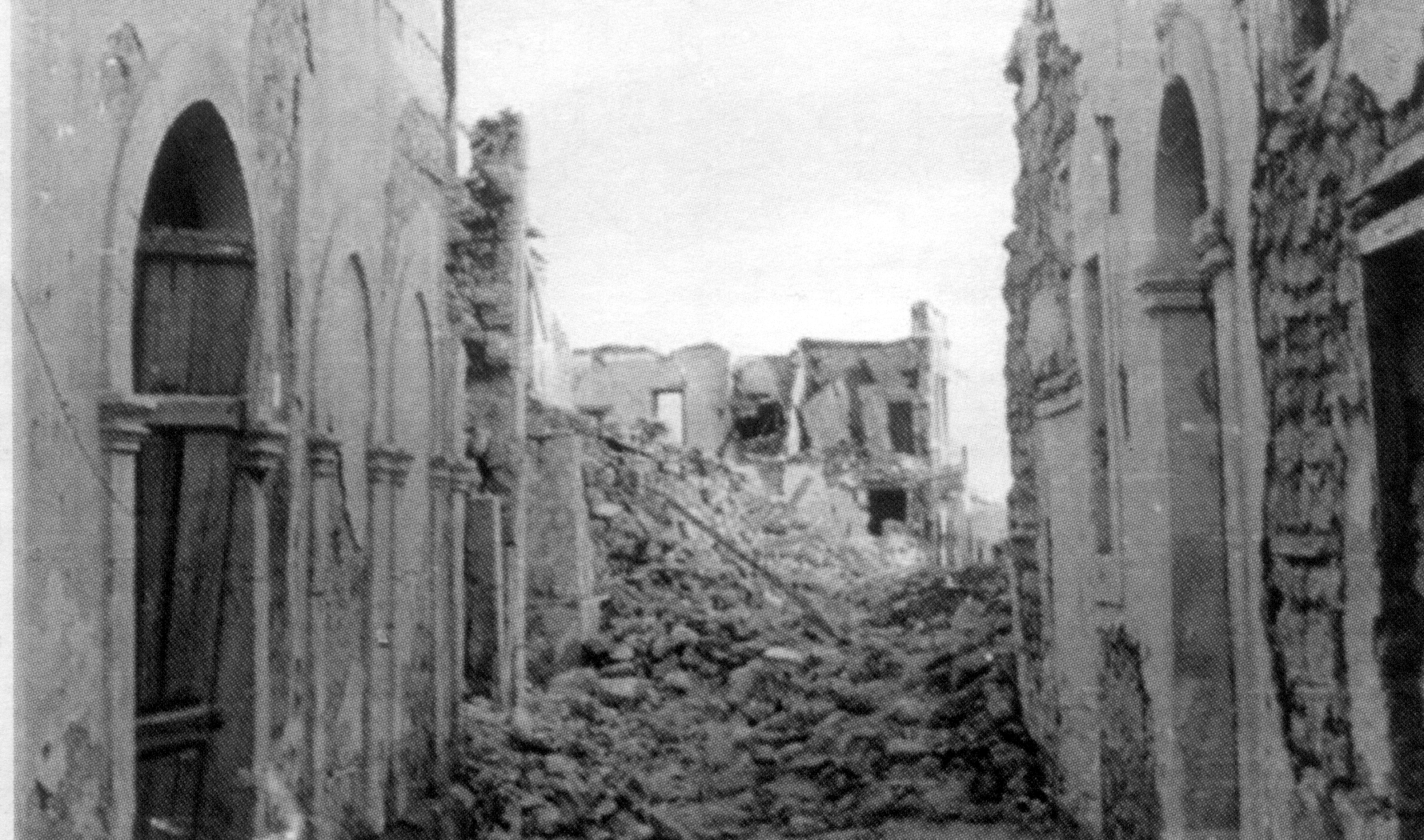
Damage from shells in the Jewish Quarter of Tripoli

Roumani writes that survivors of Giado "returned to find their homes ransacked and destroyed, their shops bombarded and in ruins, and hardly any aspect of community life left." Jewish soldiers of the British Eighth Army supported the repatriated Jews and helped them to rebuild their communities and establish Jewish schools. Even under British occupation, antisemitism worsened, and following pogroms in 1945 and 1948, almost all of Libya's Jews immigrated to the newly-formed Jewish state of Israel. Further expulsion and flight took place until 2004, when the last Libyan Jew escaped. Today, Libya has no Jews.

== Legacy ==
The last surviving barrack of Giado, photographed before its demolition

Cover of the camp diary of Yosef Dadush

No trials were ever held for the guards or administrators of the concentration camp in Giado. In 1978, the Koblenz Oberlandesgericht determined that imprisonment of Jews at Giado was not German-instigated, and thus that survivors of the camp were not entitled to compensation from the German government's fund for Nazi-era forced laborers. In 2002, following the 1997 publication of a study by Dr. Irit Abramski-Bligh on the history of the Libyan and Tunisian Jewish communities during the Holocaust, survivors of Giado were granted recognition and eligibility to receive compensation from Germany.

On Yom HaShoah in 2020, the camp diary of Giado survivor Yosef Dadush, whose infant daughter Ada died of typhus in Giado, was published posthumously after being discovered by his son. The manuscript, written in Italian, had been buried among Dadush's old photos and papers, and took four years to decipher and translate to Hebrew for publication. The diary's editor, Shlomo Abramovich, won the Israeli Prime Minister's Prize for Encouraging and Empowering Research about Jewish Communities in Arab Countries and Iran for the book in 2022. The book was approved for inclusion in Israeli high school curricula in 2021.

On Yom HaShoah, Libyan Jews sing a piyyut (Jewish liturgical poem or hymn) called "הללויה עם נברא" (Hallelujah Am Nivra, "Hallelujah, a Nation Is Born"), which was composed after the liberation of Giado. Stanislao Pugliese writes that "[Italy's] role in the death process of Jews in Libya in the Giado camp and elsewhere not only deserves to be condemned but is also an important and neglected part of World War II Holocaust historiography."

The barracks of Giado were used as a school for decades following the liberation of the camp. Eric Salerno writes about a young Libyan teacher who fought with Libyan authorities to prevent the destruction of the barracks; he wanted it to be a museum dedicated to the shared history of Berbers and Jews in Libya. By 2004, no physical trace of the camp remained at the site. The camp's structure was leveled and its Jewish cemetery destroyed. A road was built over the site of the camp and the ancient cave-dwellings.
