= Temezda =

Temezda تمزدة Tmezda, Tamizda, Tamazda
- Village
- Interactive map of Temezda
- Location in Libya
- Country: Libya
- Region: Tripolitania
- District: Jabal al Gharbi

Temezda, Tmezda, Tamizda, Temizda, Tamazda or Tamazdah (Arabic: تمزدة) is a settlement in the Nafusa Mountains of northwestern Libya (historical Tripolitania), located west of the town of Jadu.

== History ==
Tamazda is mentioned in Kitâb al-Siyar, a work by Aḥmad ibn Saʿīd al-Shammākhī, a Yafran-born scholar (d. 1522).

Before the Islamic conquest of Tripolitania in 643–644 CE, the Nafusa region was predominantly Christian. Following the conquest, the indigenous Berber population, belonging to the Nafusa tribe, gradually converted to Islam. However, the region did not adopt Sunni Islam; instead, by the mid-8th century it had largely embraced Ibadi Islam, Islam's third largest branch, associated with the Kharijites.

== Archaeology ==
=== The Hawariyyin Mosque ===
The Hawariyyin Mosque, meaning "mosque of the apostles", is located in an isolated position near the village. It is a stone structure consisting of three naves divided by arcades and featuring a protruding mihrab. The arches separating the naves were decorated with large checkered designs. Its interior once bore inscriptions, geometric patterns and handprints in plaster, all documented in a 1970 survey, but these had largely deteriorated by the time of another survey conducted in 2010. By the time of the 2010 survey, the mosque had fallen into severe disrepair; part of its roof collapsed, its mihrab niche crumbled, and some rubble accumulated on the floor.

In the late 19th century, Adolphe de Calassanti Motylinski, a French scholar, requested descriptions of several churches in the Nafusa region, which were provided by a local Berber, Brâhîm ibn Slîmân al-Shammâkhî. Al-Shammâkhî referred to "an apostolic mosque" and "a great apostolic mosque of ancient origin" in Temezda, noting that its stone pillars bore inscriptions in a script no longer understood by the local population. In addition, he reported that local religious scholars attributed these markings to a pre-Islamic pagan population. Despite the presence of ancient stones in the surrounding, there is no definitive evidence linking the structure to an earlier church.

=== The Kanisa Mosque ===
The Kanisa Mosque is situated several hundred meters from the Hawariyyin Mosque. It is identified with the "Kanisa Tamazda" listed in the medieval Ibadi pilgrimage guide known as the Tasmiyat mashāhid al-jabal. It originated as a Byzantine church that was later adapted for Ibadi worship, rather than a mosque constructed from earlier material. The name Kanisa means a church, but could also refer to a synagogue.

The original building is constructed of stone on a square plan. A shallow annex was later added to the main structure to accommodate the mihrab niche, the qibla wall, and an entrance doorway, all executed in a cruder technique than the main body of the building. A small double courtyard, fronted by a low enclosing wall and containing a cistern, lies before this addition. The prayer room is divided into four naves by three arcades, each supported by columns fashioned predominantly from Roman-cut stone. Nine columns appear to be of Roman origin, and some retain Roman bases. Unlike other Ibadi mosques, the structure has a square rather than elongated plan, higher-quality stonework, an absence of a dedicated separate space for women, and a complete lack of geometric decorative motifs.

The mosque had deteriorated substantially between two surveys conducted in 1970 and 2010. The ceiling had partially caved in, stone blocks lay scattered around the building, and a mass of soil and debris buried large parts of the floor.

== See also ==
- Islamic Tripolitania and Cyrenaica
- Tarmisa

== Bibliography ==
=== Sources ===
- Prévost, Virginie (2012). "Byzantine Churches Converted to Islam?". Revue de l'histoire des religions. 229 (3). Armand Colin: 325–347. doi:10.4000/rhr.7905. ISSN 0035-1423.
- Welsby Sjöström, Isabella (2024). "In Search of the Romans in Jabal Nafusa and Surrounding Area". In Mugnai, Niccolò (ed.). Tripolitania in the Roman Empire and Beyond. British Institute for Libyan and Northern African Studies. pp. 176–178. doi:10.2307/jj.24081269.15. ISBN 978-1-915808-11-0.
