= Jadu, Libya =

ⵊⴰⴷⵓ Jado: ⴼⵚⵚⴰⵟⵓ; جادو; Fessatu
- Town
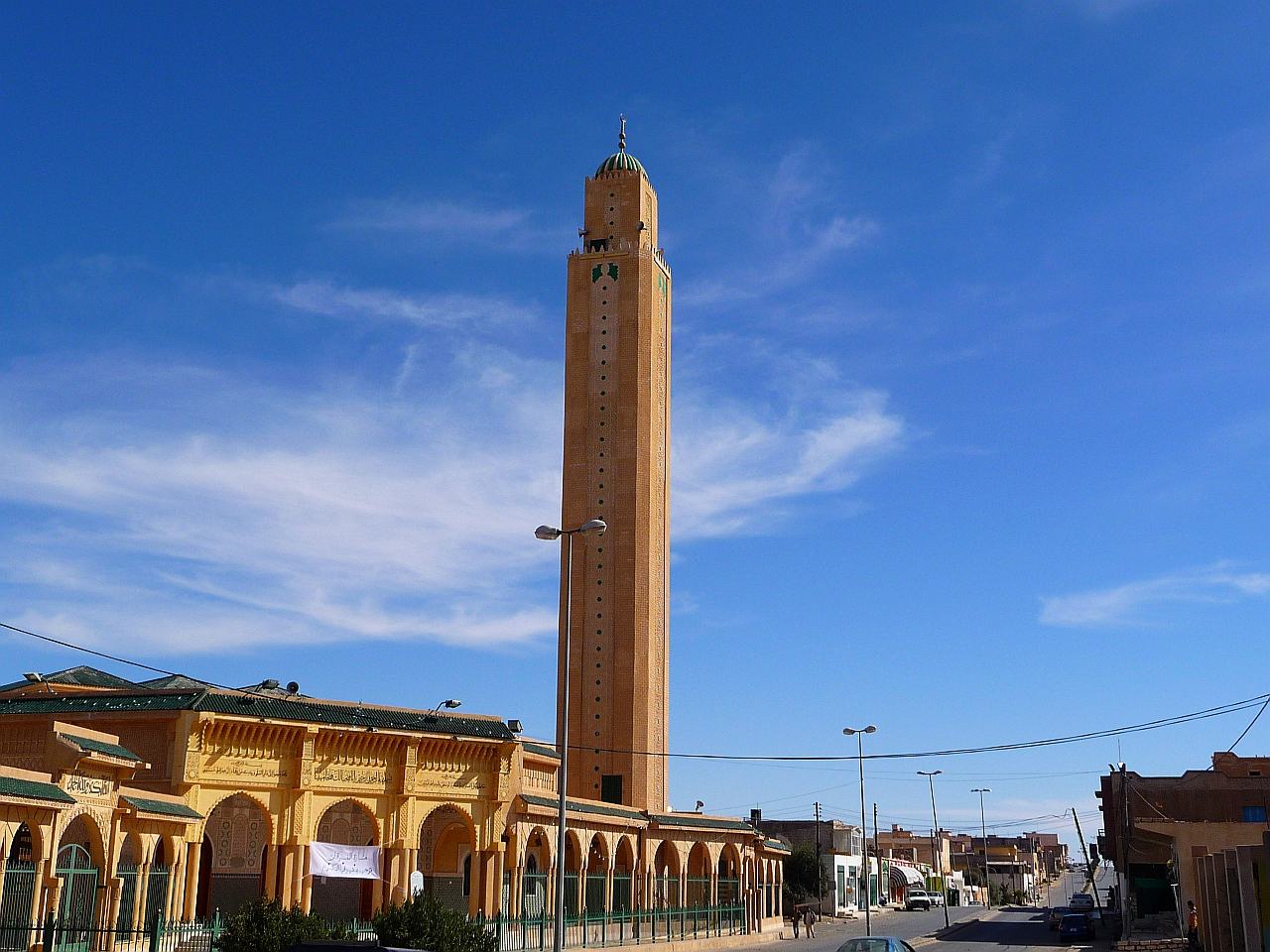
- Mosque in Jadu

- Location in Libya
- Coordinates: 31°57′N 12°01′E
- Country: Libya
- Region: Tripolitania
- District: Jabal al Gharbi
- Elevation: 2,448 ft (746 m)

Population (2004)
  - Total: 6,013
- Time zone: UTC+2 (EET)
- License Plate Code: 43

Jadu or Gado (/ˈdʒɑːduː/ JAH-doo;Berber languages: ⵊⴰⴷⵓ ;Berber languages: ⴼⵚⵚⵟⵓ; Italian: Giado; Arabic: جادو, romanized: Jādū) is a mountain town in western Libya (Tripolitania), formerly in the Jabal al Gharbi District. Before the 2007 reorganization, and after 2015 it was part of Yafran District.

== Geography ==
Jadu is located in the Nafusa Mountains, twenty-five kilometers southwest of Tarmeisa (طرميسة, Ţarmīşah).

== History ==
Jadu was the main trade town of the Nafusa, and the first stop on the caravan roads leading from Tripoli to the Fezzan, the Wagadu empire, Gao and the Kanem Empire. The town of Djado in modern-day Niger was likely founded by Ibadi merchants from Jadu.

Al-Bakri, an Arab Andalusian geographer writing in the second half of the 10th century, mentions a Jewish population inhabiting Jadu.

Jadu was formerly the capital of the Nafusa Mountains District.

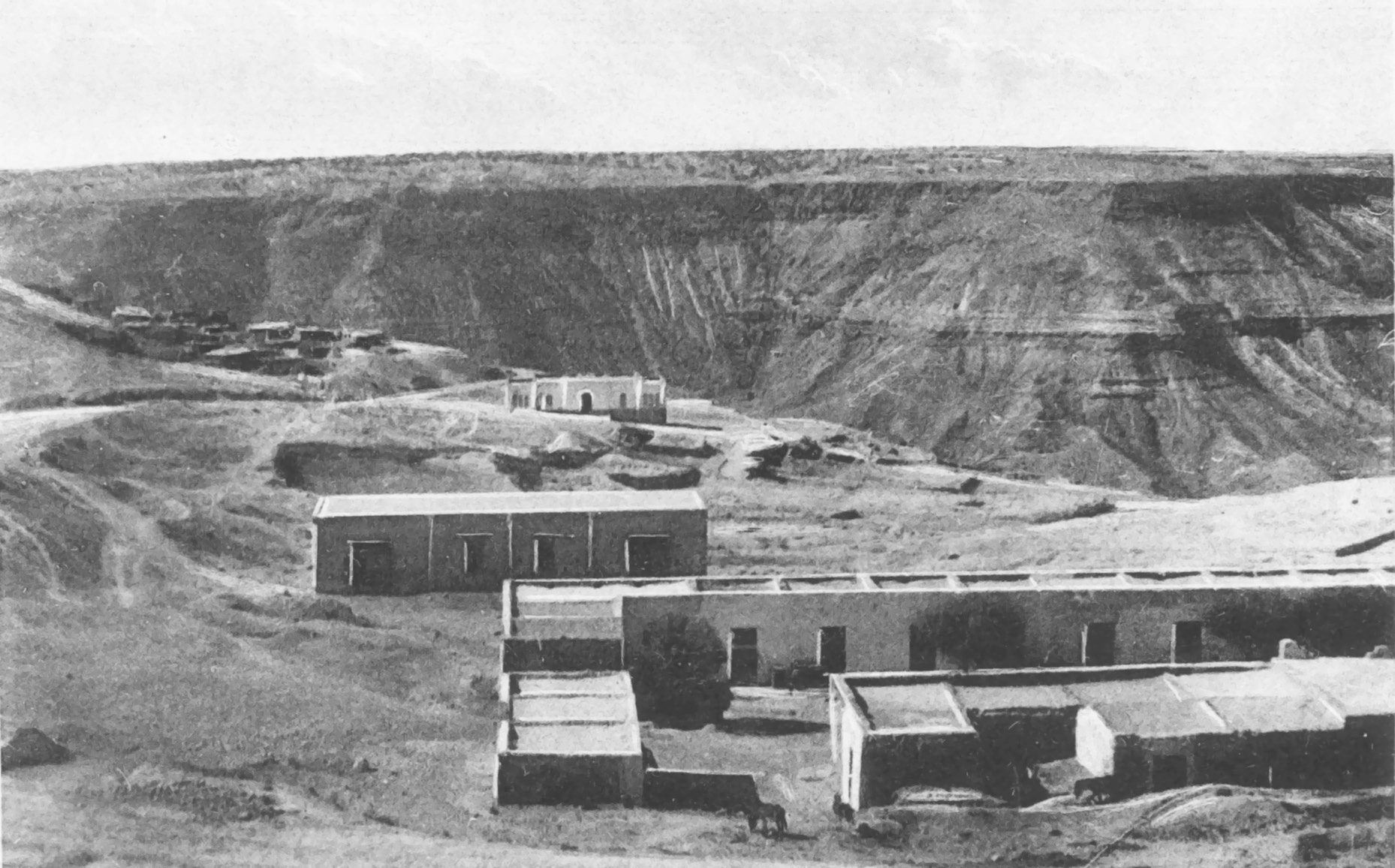
Giado concentration camp during its operation

=== Giado concentration camp ===
Giado, as it was then known by its Italian name, was the site of an Italian concentration camp during the Second World War. In 1942, about 2,600 Jews and other people, who were considered undesirables by Italians, were rounded up throughout Libya and sent to the Giado camp. 564 died from typhus and other privations. The camp was liberated by the British Army in January 1943.

=== Civil war ===
Jadu's council rejected the draft 2017 constitution.

In April 2020, local Amazigh forces were bombed at the end of the Second Libyan Civil War.

== See also ==
- The Holocaust in Italian Libya
- List of cities in Libya
