= The Holocaust in Libya =

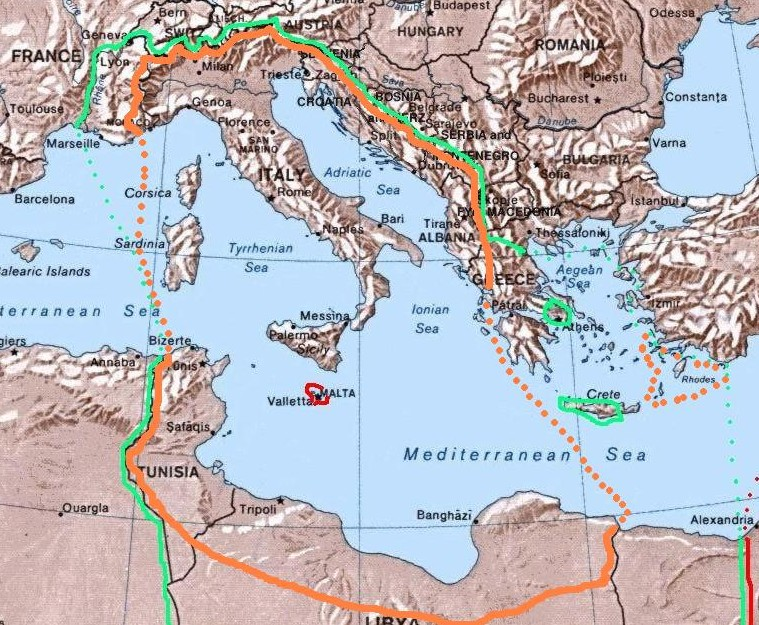
A 1940 "Imperial Italia" map of Libya under Italian control

Conditions worsened for the Jews of Libya after the passage of Italy's Manifesto of Race in 1938. Following the German intervention in 1941, some Jews were sent to camps in continental Europe, where those who survived stayed until the end of World War II.

Italian Libya had two large Jewish communities, one in the western district of Tripolitania, and mainly in its capital Tripoli, and the other in the eastern district of Cyrenaica and its capital Benghazi. During the Holocaust hundreds of Jews died of starvation. With approximately 40,000 Jews living in Libya before the war, as a result of the later Jewish exodus from Arab and Muslim countries, there are no Jews left in the country today.

== Background: the beginning of the Italian occupation ==
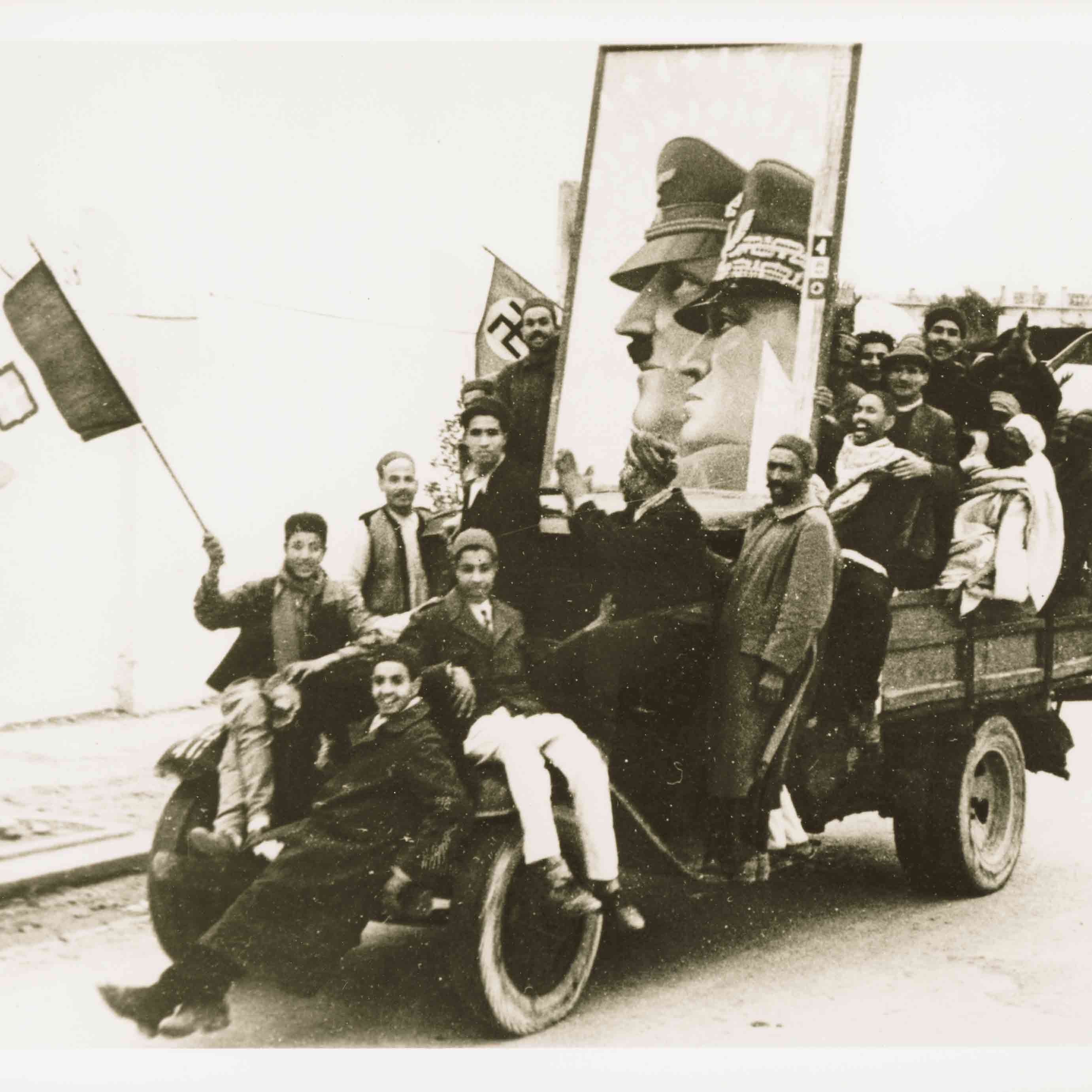
Supporters of Hitler and Mussolini in Libya, March 1943

In July 1911 the Italian government demanded control of Libya from the Ottoman Empire. When the demand was not met, Italy declared war and quickly conquered the main cities along the coast of Libya. Some of the Jews of Libya supported Italy, and some actively contributed to the war effort. One of the reasons behind the support of Italy and a regime change began with the Italian influence on Libya through commercial and cultural ties. Other causes were the recurring pogroms the Jews suffered from at the hands of their Muslim neighbors; the wave of anti-Semitism that spread through the Ottoman Empire during the mid-19th century did not pass over the Jews of Libya. The autonomy that they received from the empire didn't prevent the recurring pogroms.

After the Italian conquest, the Jews received official status and were an important religious-ethnic group due to their key role in the Libyan economy. In 1934, after the fascists' rise to power, Italo Balbo was appointed as the governor-general of Italian Libya. He developed the “Italian colony” and, like many fascists, saw it as symbol of Italy's returning to the greatness of the Roman Empire—the last time that Italy controlled Libya. During his term in office, the process of modernizing Jewish communities accelerated, and Jews took part in government establishments. Balbo respected the Jewish tradition so long as it did not prevent the progress he brought to Libya. One instance of conflict occurred when Jews closed their shops on the Sabbath, even outside the Jewish community. Balbo sentenced the Jews to be punished by flogging, but later, in October 1937, he admitted at a gathering of the Fascist Party that he had been mistaken and that he did not distinguish between Catholics and Jews - they were all Italian. Earlier that year, Benito Mussolini came to the Jewish community during a visit to Italian Libya and received a warm reception. He promised that the Jews of Libya would be safe and that Italy would respect the Jewish community and their traditions, religion and leadership.

== During the Holocaust ==
=== Worsening status of the Jews ===
Italy's aggressive policies led to its isolation within Europe, and to a pact with Nazi Germany in 1936. The Rome-Berlin axis forced the countries to operate based on common principles, so the German race laws applied to Italy and its colonies. In the racial manifesto, which was published in Italy in 1938, racist and anti-semitic laws appeared as representing the Italian Fascist Party's position. The main laws were:

- Jewish students were banned from high schools and higher education establishments
- Any Jew with a government position was to be fired
- All Jewish soldiers in the Italian army were to be demoted.
- Jews were forbidden from participating in government bids.

Italian Libya's governor, Balbo, tried to convince Mussolini to postpone the application of the laws in Libya, claiming that they would destroy the Libyan economy. Mussolini allowed Balbo to apply the laws as he saw fit. Despite the relative protection that the Jews enjoyed under Balbo, Jewish government workers were fired, Jewish children were expelled from schools, and Jews wishing to move between cities required a license. Balbo was killed in July 1940, when an Italian ship shot down his airplane. Italian officials explained the incident as an accident.

In the second half of 1940, after Italy joined World War II on the side of Germany, the Jews' situation worsened. Some Jews, like the Muslim population, escaped inland. The Jewish community in Tripoli rented homes for the needy, constructed underground bomb shelters and supplied education for the children who were expelled.

As time went by, the race laws became worse - the Jews of Cyrenaica were sent to a concentration camp in Tripolitania, and most of the community's workforce was sent to labor camps. Jews who were citizens of enemy countries were expelled from the country, and the rest suffered from racist and oppressive laws that hurt them socially and economically. In mid-1942, the governor decreed that Jews were forbidden to enter into real estate deals or commerce outside the community, to publish any material that did not relate to religion, and subject to other oppressive laws.

=== The Jews of Cyrenaica under regime changes ===
The accelerated application of the Race Laws caused the Jews to lose trust in the Italian government and led them to support the British instead. When Britain first conquered Cyrenaica in December 1940, the Jews were freed from the race laws. The soldiers met with the Benghazi community many times, renewed Zionist activities, and supported educational activity. On April 3, 1941, the Italian-German forces managed to push the British forces out of Benghazi, and 250 Jews left with them. The Italian citizens who lived in the city during the period of British control held a grudge towards the Jews, and conducted pogroms during which two Jews were killed, and a great deal of property was pillaged and damaged.

In November of that year, Britain reconquered Cyrenaica. Italy decided to expel all the Jews to Tripolitania and imposed harsh punishments on the remaining Jews, including the death penalty for three of them. During the last British conquest of Cyrenaica in November 1942, the remaining 360 Jews were deterred from contacting the British army for fear of further punishment if the Axis recaptured the region. The blow to the Jewish community was the worst of any Libyan community. Over 500 Jews were killed, out of a community of 4,000. The lives of the survivors were in danger. Close to 2,600 Jews were sent to the Giado concentration camp; some families were sent to other camps. About 200 British citizens were transferred to Italy and some 250 French citizens to Tunisia.

=== Giado concentration camp ===
The majority, or over 75%, of the Jewish community in Cyrenaica was sent to the Giado concentration camp, approximately 240 km (150 mi) south of Tripoli. The prosperous urban community of 2,600 people was crammed into booths in an old military camp that had been converted into a concentration camp. The health and sanitation conditions were terrible, and many of Jews suffered from malnutrition. The culmination of health hazards was presented in a typhus epidemic that broke out during the month of December in 1942. Jewish inmates were in charge of distributing this insufficient food supply. Although the leadership was Italian, guards at the Giado Concentration Camp consisted of both Italians and Arabs. After many rejections of the requests by Jewish leaders to increase the food allowance, the camp officers permitted Arab merchants to sell basic food supplies to the Jews, which they did for a high price - one that few could afford. After further requests, they were allowed to receive aid from Tripoli.

Rabbi Frigia Zuaretz requested permission to set up a synagogue in the camp, and was allocated one of the booths. With the first death in the community, the community leaders needed to make burial arrangements. They found a Jewish cemetery from the 18th century where they were able to bury their dead - in numbers that grew daily, mainly due to malnutrition and the spread of typhus.

The order to execute the prisoners wasn't carried out. After a few days, the camp's officers retreated and some of the prisoners escaped. When the British arrived, they found the Jews in an unstable and disorganized state. In March of that year, the British military Rabbi Orbach visited, and received permission to send 60 Jews to Palestine. The camp survivors were sent at first to Tripoli, where they became a burden on the local community, until October 1943 when most of the survivors moved to Benghazi. The community never returned to its previous prosperity, and few managed to return to economic stability. Out of the 2600 Jewish residents at Benghaz camp, 526 of them perished.

=== Forced labor ===
In June 1942, Italian Libya's governor decreed that the legal status of Libyan and Italian men was the same, which meant that men aged 18–45 were drafted into military service. Men from Tripolitania county were sent to work in Sidi Azaz and Bukbuk. In August, 3,000 Jews were sent to the Sidi Azaz labor camp but, due to the lack of infrastructure, most were sent back to their homes, to serve the country and to work camps in Cyrenaica. The Jews were a substantial work force that the community was lacking.

The camp was isolated and desert-like, with few Italian guards and tents. It was an open camp, which allowed the rich to purchase food which they sometimes shared with others. After a while, residents of Tripoli traveled out to meet their family members. The camp residents started their day at 6:00 am with roll call and it ended at 5:00 pm. They received 500 grams of bread, rice, or pasta as food. Unprecedented consideration was shown when the Italian guards allowed the prisoners to rest on the Sabbath. There was one violent incident, when a prisoner argued with an Italian guard as was shot dead as a result. The guard was transferred and the Jews learned to stay out of arguments with the guards.

The Bukbuk camp was set up in East Cyrenaica, on the Egyptian border. The prisoners were tasked with paving roads from Libya to Egypt for the army's purposes. The camp was so remote that there were no guards or fences. There was a lack of water, for a supply arrived only every few days. The work day was officially from 7:00 am to 5:00 pm, but the lack of supervision allowed the prisoners to work at a leisurely pace and, despite the complaints of the Italian supervisor who came every few days, the camp was short of guards. The camp did have an Italian doctor who ignored the mostly invented diseases and injuries of the prisoners, which allowed them to claim they were not suited for work and be released. In October 1942, Bukbuk was the target of multiple bombings, and only in November, with the retreat of Italian forces, were the prisoners released and allowed to find their own way back to Tripoli, most of them with the aid of passing vehicles.

=== Expulsion of Jews with foreign citizenship ===
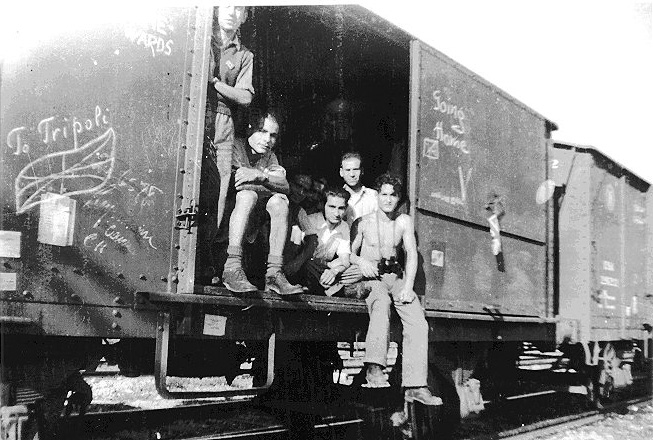
Jewish Holocaust survivors return to Libya from concentration camp Bergen-Belsen

German soldiers entered Italian Libya in 1941 after the Italian army was defeated in Cyrenaica, but German influence was felt starting in 1938. Due to the involvement and importance that the foreign Jews had in economy and commerce, they were treated normally, and the Italian government wasn't quick to apply the racial laws and expel the foreign Jews. Yet, there were incidents of German soldiers harassing Jews. After Italy joined the war in June 1940 the Jews' conditions worsened, and in September all the citizens of enemy countries were put in detention camps, in decent conditions. They were all expelled during the second half of 1941, mainly due to the fact that the detention camps became an economic burden. Many of those expelled had lived in Libya their whole lives, holding a second citizenship for convenience only. Approximately 1,600 Jews with French citizenship were expelled to Tunisia. Over 400 with British citizenship were sent to Italy. Those expelled from Benghazi were allowed to take valuables and were sent to a detention camp in Bologna, while those leaving Tripoli were allowed only personal items, and sent mainly to camps in Siena and Firenze. Living conditions were tight but they were treated well by the guards. In September 1943, Italy fell under German control, and in October Jewish men were sent from Arzo camp, east of Siena, to forced labor. Between February and May 1944, the expellees from Tripoli and some from Benghazi were sent to Bergen-Belsen camp, while most of the Benghazi expellees were sent to Innsbruck-Reichenau camp.

The food supply in Bergen Belsen was terrible, working conditions were very hard and prisoners were abused and harassed by SS soldiers.

The Innsbruck-Reichenau camp was located in western Austria and was an offshoot of the Dachau camp. It was surrounded by an electric fence, there was separation between men and women and the inmates were all forced to work. Unlike the other prisoners, the Jews of Libya were allowed to stay in their civilian clothes. The SS guards were cruel to the Jews- they were banned from any religious expression or worship, and punishment such as flogging, imprisonment and death by shooting were common.

Beyond the known horrors of the Holocaust, the Jews of Libya were a foreign element in frigid Europe, which made survival much harder. Beyond the different climate, the cultural difference was a major obstacle. In both camps the Jews of Libya made an effort to observe Jewish dietary restrictions despite the hardships, and traded their cooked meals for bread. Many of the Jews of Libya perished in the camp, mainly elderly people who couldn't withstand the hunger, torture and disease.

== Aftermath ==
According to Maurice Roumani, a Libyan emigrant who was previously the Executive Director of WOJAC, the most important factors which influenced the Libyan Jewish community to emigrate were "the scars left from the last years of the Italian occupation and the entry of the British Military in 1943 accompanied by the Jewish Palestinian soldiers".

Following the Allied victory at the Battle of El Agheila in December 1942, German and Italian troops were driven out of Libya. The British garrisoned the Palestine Regiment in Cyrenaica, which later became the core of the Jewish Brigade which was later also stationed in Tripolitania. The pro-Zionist soldiers encouraged the spread of Zionism throughout the local Jewish population.

In 1943, Mossad LeAliyah Bet began to send emissaries to prepare the infrastructure for the emigration of the Libyan Jewish community.

The most severe post-World War II anti-Jewish violence in Arab countries was in Tripolitania (North-West Libya), then under British control, in November 1945. Over a period of several days more than 130 Jews (including 36 children) were killed, hundreds were injured, 4,000 were left homeless (displaced) and 2,400 were reduced to poverty. Five synagogues in Tripoli and four in provincial towns were destroyed, and over 1,000 Jewish residences and commercial buildings were plundered in Tripoli alone. Further riots took place in Tripolitania in June 1948, when 15 Jews were killed and 280 Jewish homes destroyed. In November 1948, a few months after the events in Tripolitania, the American consul in Tripoli Orray Taft Jr. reported that: "There is reason to believe that the Jewish Community has become more aggressive as the result of the Jewish victories in Palestine. There is also reason to believe that the community here is receiving instructions and guidance from the State of Israel. Whether or not the change in attitude is the result of instructions or a progressive aggressiveness is hard to determine. Even with the aggressiveness or perhaps because of it, both Jewish and Arab leaders inform me that the inter-racial relations are better now than they have been for several years and that understanding, tolerance and cooperation are present at any top level meeting between the leaders of the two communities."

Emigration to Israel began in 1949, following the establishment of a Jewish Agency office in Tripoli. According to Harvey E. Goldberg, "a number of Libyan Jews" believe that the Jewish Agency was behind the riots, given that the riots helped them achieve their goal. Between the establishment of the State of Israel in 1948 and Libyan independence in December 1951 over 30,000 Libyan Jews emigrated to Israel.

Soon, the Jewish community of Libya ceased to exist, with most of its members emigrating to Israel and other countries, mainly Italy.

== See also ==
- Allied administration of Libya
- Jews outside Europe under Axis occupation

== Sources ==
- Ariel, Ari (2013), Jewish-Muslim Relations and Migration from Yemen to Palestine in the Late Nineteenth and Twentieth Centuries, BRILL, ISBN 9789004265370
- Fischbach, Michael R. (2008), Claiming Jewish Communal Property in Iraq, Middle East Report, archived from the original on 2010-06-20
- Goldberg, Harvey E. (1990), Jewish Life in Muslim Libya: Rivals and Relatives, University of Chicago Press, ISBN 9780226300924
- Roumani, Maurice (2009), The Jews of Libya: Coexistence, Persecution, Resettlement, Sussex Academic Press, ISBN 9781845193676
