= Tarmisa =

Tarmisa مدينة إيطرميس Tarmisah, Tarmeisa
- Village
- Interactive map of Tarmisa
- Location in Libya
- Country: Libya
- Region: Tripolitania
- District: Jabal al Gharbi

Tarmisa is a settlement, and an adjoining abandoned Berber village, located in the Jabal Nafusa area of northwestern Libya (historical Tripolitania).

== Geography ==
Tarmisa stands on a cliff overlooking the Jafarah Plain, roughly five kilometers from Jadu. The abandoned village lies just north of the present-day settlement.

== Description ==
=== Mosque ===
The abandoned village has a small mosque, located just before the spur narrows to its tip. Its arched stone doorframe features carved roundels of a regularity unusual for Berber construction, suggesting the frame may have been transported from a Roman building. Archaeologist Isabella Welsby Sjöström photographed this decoration, noting that it appears on only one side of the entrance, an asymmetry that supports the argument for reuse of earlier material.

Sjöström additionally observed what may be a blocked doorway inside, its wall covered in multiple layers of plaster, containing niches of an unusual half-moon form.

=== Chi-rho monogram ===
An inscribed stone block was found at Tarmisa in 1914. It bears a Christian Chi Rho monogram (a symbol of Jesus Christ) enclosed within a wreath and flanked by stylized palm trees, pointing to a Late Roman date and a possible origin in a church. Pottery specialist Philip Kenrick records it as held in Room 20 of the Leptis Magna Museum. Sjöström, however, records it as being in the Museum of Libya in the country's capital, Tripoli.

=== Other features ===
The masonry visible in the settlement is of the type that archaeologist Francesco Corò, who visited the area in the 1920s, identified as local Berber work, in some cases considered by him to be contemporary with Roman-era buildings in the region. Small, cup-like depressions can be found on rock surfaces throughout the site. They were created by the grinding of date stones, once used as camel fodder and also processed into halva-style confectionary.

== See also ==
- Roman Libya
- Temezda

== Sources ==
- Kenrick, Philip (2009). Libya Archaeological Guides; Tripolitania. Silphium Press. ISBN 9781900971089.
- Welsby Sjöström, Isabella (2024). "In Search of the Romans in Jabal Nafusa and Surrounding Area". In Mugnai, Niccolò (ed.). Tripolitania in the Roman Empire and Beyond. Vol. 4. British Institute for Libyan and Northern African Studies. pp. 173–192. doi:10.2307/jj.24081269.15. ISBN 978-1-915808-11-0.
