= Tighrinna =

Tighrinna, also known as Harit il Yhud (The Jewish Quarter), was a Jewish village located in the Gharyan District of northern Libya. Several hundred metres separated it from Menzel Tighrinna, where the Muslim population lived. In 1943 there were 343 Jews living in the village, which had two synagogues and Jewish cemetery. The population lived in caves. In 1943, the British occupied the region. Soon after, events in Palestine sparked rioting by local Muslims who looted and burnt of Jewish homes. This led to the depopulation of the village, with refugees fleeing to Israel between 1948 and 1951.
