= Maurice M. Roumani =

Israeli political professor

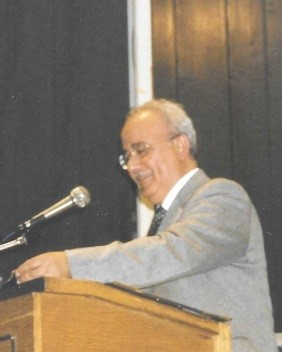
Maurice M. Roumani

Maurice M. Roumani (Hebrew: מוריס רומני) is a professor of Politics and International Relations, Religion and Society of the Middle East and the Founder of the J. R. Elyachar Center for Studies in Sephardi Heritage at Ben-Gurion University of the Negev in Israel. He specializes in Ethnic Relations in Israel, Jews of Arab countries, the Middle East Conflict, and he is an expert on the History of Libyan Jews, Jewish-Muslim Relations and the impact of Holocaust policies in North Africa.

== Biography ==
Roumani received his B.A. with Honors from Brandeis University and his M.A. from The University of Chicago, where he studied International Relations and the Middle East with Hans Morgenthau and Leonard Binder. Following his studies at The Chicago school of Janowitz, Binder and Shils he continued at the School of African and Asian Studies (SOAS) at the University of London. Under the supervision of P. J. Vatikiotis, he received his Ph. D. about the absorption and integration of different social groups as reflected in the non-military functions of the Israeli army.

He was offered a teaching position at Ben-Gurion University of the Negev, where he established in 1981 the J. R. Elyachar Center for the Study of Sephardi Heritage. The center offered 22 courses in Sephardi history, literature, anthropology, sociology, philosophy, ladino and music.

He also held research positions at the Middle East Institute of Harvard University, at the Center for International Development and Conflict Management (CIDCM) of the University of Maryland, at the Oxford Center for Postgraduate Hebrew Studies of Oxford University.

== Research ==
Roumani continues his research projects about Libya and Libyan Jewry, the role of Colonialism and Arab Nationalism in North African and the Middle East, the Arab-Israel Conflict, ethnic relations, the applications of Holocaust policies in North Africa and Jewish-Muslim relations in the Modern period.

== Publications ==
=== Books ===
- The Jews of Libya, Coexistence, Persecutions, Resettlement (English, 2007. Italian, 2008. Hebrew, 2017).
- Ethnicity, Integration and the Military. Editor with Henry Dietz and Jerry Elkins (1991).
- From Immigrant to Citizen (1979).
- The Case of Jews from Arab Countries: A Neglected Issue (1978). Published in four languages: English, French, Hebrew and Spanish.
- Forces of Change in the Middle East (1971).

=== Selected articles ===
- Aspects of Ambiguity in Islam towards Minorities (1979).
- “Ethnicity and Ethnic Categorization: A critical analysis of literature on the social Gap in Israel” (1980)
- "Zionism and Social Change in Libya at the Turn of the Century". Studies in Zionism 18 (1987).
- "The Sephardi Factor in Israeli Politics". The Middle East Journal 42 (1988).
- Ethnicity, Integration and the Military. Editor with Henry Dietz and Jerry Elkins (1991).
- "Minoranze religiose e crisi del welfare: l’ebraismo in Inghilterra e Francia". Religioni e Società. Rivista di scienze sociali della Religione 39 (2001).
- “Civil Society and the Challenge of Modernization: The case of the Muslim World” (2001)
- After the Militant. The Volunteer beyond the Secularization: European Identity, Welfare State, Religion(s) with Andrea Spini (2002).
- "The Silent Refugees: Jews from Arab Countries". Mediterranean Quarterly: A Journal of Global Issues 14 (2003).
- "Da profughi a cittadini: La minoranza ebraica dei paesi Arabi oggi in Israele". La Rassegna Mensile di Israel 70 (2004).
- Contributor to The Encyclopedia of the Modern Middle East and North Africa, edited by Philip Mattar (2004).
- "L'albero della vita: il mutamento della festa della comunità ebraica libica dall'esilio ad Israele". Religioni e Società. Rivista di scienze sociali della Religione 53-54 (2006).
- "The Final Exodus of the Libyan Jews in 1967". Jewish Political Review 19 (2007).
- Contributor to The Encyclopedia of Jews in the Islamic World, edited by Norman Stillman (2010).
- "La Primavera araba: Troppo presto per giudicare?", Religione E Societa, XXVII, 74, 2012
- Gli ebrei di Libia, dalla coesistenza all’esodo (2015).
- “È possibile che l’effetto ISIS ridisegni il Medio Oriente e il conflitto Israele-Palestina?” Religioni e Società. Rivista di scienze sociali della Religione 85 (2016).
- “The expulsion of Libyan Jews to Tunisia in World War II and the bombing of La Marsa.” La Rassegna Mensile di Israel 82 (2017).
- “Gerusalemme: mito e realtà. Oltre le religioni?” Religioni e Società. Rivista di scienze sociali della Religione 95 (2019).
